= List of Corymbia species =

The following is a list of species in the genus Corymbia accepted by the Australian Plant Census as at April 2023.

== Species ==
- Corymbia abbreviata (Blakely & Jacobs) K.D.Hill & L.A.S.Johnson – scraggy bloodwood (W.A., N.T.)
- Corymbia abergiana (F. Muell.) K.D.Hill & L.A.S.Johnson – range bloodwood, Rockingham Bay bloodwood (Qld.)
- Corymbia aparrerinja K.D.Hill & L.A.S.Johnson – ghost gum (N.T., Qld., W.A.)
- Corymbia arafurica K.D.Hill & L.A.S.Johnson (N.T.)
- Corymbia arenaria (Blakely) K.D.Hill & L.A.S.Johnson – bundah bundah black bloodwood (W.A.)
- Corymbia arnhemensis (D.J.Carr & S.G.M.Carr) K.D.Hill & L.A.S.Johnson – Katherine Gorge bloodwood (N.T.)
- Corymbia aspera (F.Muell.) K.D.Hill & L.A.S.Johnson – rough-leaved ghost gum, rough leaf range gum, desert bloodwood, Brittle Range gum, snappy gum (W.A., N.T., Qld.)
- Corymbia aureola (Brooker & A.R.Bean) K.D.Hill & L.A.S.Johnson – yellowjacket, yellow bloodwood (Qld.)
- Corymbia bella K.D.Hill & L.A.S.Johnson – ghost gum, weeping ghost gum, paper-fruited bloodwood (W.A., N.T., Qld.)
- Corymbia blakei K.D.Hill & L.A.S.Johnson – ghost gum (Qld.)
- Corymbia bleeseri (Blakely) K.D.Hill & L.A.S.Johnson – glossy-leaved bloodwood, smooth-stemmed bloodwood (W.A., N.T.)
- Corymbia bloxsomei (Maiden) K.D.Hill & L.A.S.Johnson – yellowjack, yellow jacket, yellow bloodwood, (Qld.)
- Corymbia brachycarpa (D.J.Carr & S.G.M.Carr) K.D.Hill & L.A.S.Johnson (Qld.)
- Corymbia bunites (Brooker & A.R.Bean) K.D.Hill & L.A.S.Johnson – Blackdown yellowjacket (Qld.)
- Corymbia cadophora K.D.Hill & L.A.S.Johnson – twinleaf bloodwood (W.A.)
- Corymbia calophylla (John Lindley) K.D.Hill & L.A.S.Johnson – marri (W.A.)
- Corymbia candida K.D.Hill & L.A.S.Johnson – desert ghost gum, ghost gum (W.A., N.T.)
- Corymbia chartacea (A.R.Bean) K.D.Hill & L.A.S.Johnson (N.T.)
- Corymbia chippendalei (D.J.Carr & S.G.M.Carr) K.D.Hill & L.A.S.Johnson – sand-dune bloodwood, sandhill bloodwood (W.A., N.T.)
- Corymbia chlorolampra K.D.Hill & L.A.S.Johnson (W.A.)
- Corymbia citriodora (Hook.) K.D.Hill & L.A.S.Johnson – lemon-scented gum (Qld.)
- Corymbia clandestina (A.R.Bean) K.D.Hill & L.A.S.Johnson – Drummond Range bloodwood (Qld.)
- Corymbia clarksoniana (D.J.Carr & S.G.M.Carr) K.D.Hill & L.A.S.Johnson – Clarkson's bloodwood, grey bloodwood (Qld., N.S.W.)
- Corymbia clavigera (A.Cunn. ex Schauer) K.D.Hill & L.A.S.Johnson – apple gum, cabbage gum (W.A.)
- Corymbia cliftoniana (W.Fitzg.) K.D.Hill & L.A.S.Johnson (W.A., N.T.)
- Corymbia collina (W.Fitzg.) K.D.Hill & L.A.S.Johnson – silver-leaved bloodwood (W.A.)
- Corymbia confertiflora (Kippist) K.D.Hill & L.A.S.Johnson – broad-leaved carbeen, rough leaf cabbage gum (W.A.)
- Corymbia dallachiana (Benth.) K.D.Hill & L.A.S.Johnson – Dallachy's ghost gum, Dallachy's gum (Qld.)
- Corymbia dendromerinx K.D.Hill & L.A.S.Johnson – ghost gum (W.A.)
- Corymbia deserticola (D.J.Carr & S.G.M.Carr) K.D.Hill & L.A.S.Johnson (W.A., N.T.)
- Corymbia dichromophloia (F.Muell.) K.D.Hill & L.A.S.Johnson – small-fruited bloodwood, variably-barked bloodwood, gum-topped bloodwood (W.A., N.T., Qld.)
- Corymbia disjuncta K.D.Hill & L.A.S.Johnson (W.A., N.T. Qld., New Guinea)
- Corymbia dunlopiana K.D.Hill & L.A.S.Johnson – Dunlop's bloodwood, bongonyin, Oenpelli bloodwood (N.T.)
- Corymbia ellipsoidea (D.J.Carr & S.G.M.Carr) K.D.Hill & L.A.S.Johnson (Qld.)
- Corymbia eremaea (D.J.Carr & S.G.M.Carr) K.D.Hill & L.A.S.Johnson – mallee bloodwood, hill bloodwood and Centre Range bloodwood (S.A., N.T., W.A.)
- Corymbia erythrophloia (Blakely) K.D.Hill & L.A.S.Johnson – red bloodwood, variable-barked bloodwood, red-barked bloodwood, gum-topped bloodwood (Qld.)
- Corymbia eximia (Schauer) K.D.Hill & L.A.S.Johnson – yellow bloodwood (N.S.W.)
- Corymbia ferriticola (Brooker & Edgecombe) K.D.Hill & L.A.S.Johnson – Pilbara ghost gum (W.A.)
- Corymbia ferruginea (Schauer) K.D.Hill & L.A.S.Johnson – rusty bloodwood (W.A., N.T., Qld.)
- Corymbia ficifolia (F.Muell.) K.D.Hill & L.A.S.Johnson – red flowering gum (W.A.)
- Corymbia flavescens K.D.Hill & L.A.S.Johnson – cabbage ghost gum, bastard ghost gum, scraggy cabbage gum, wrinkle-leaf ghost gum (W.A., N.T., Qld.)
- Corymbia foelscheana (F.Muell.) K.D.Hill & L.A.S.Johnson – broad-leaved bloodwood, fan-leaved bloodwood, smooth-barked bloodwood (W.A., N.T.)
- Corymbia gilbertensis (Maiden & Blakely) K.D.Hill & L.A.S.Johnson – Gilbert River ghost gum or Gilbert River box (Qld.)
- Corymbia grandifolia (R.Br. ex Benth.) K.D.Hill & L.A.S.Johnson – cabbage gum, large-leaved cabbage gum, paper-fruited bloodwood (W.A.)
- Corymbia greeniana (D.J.Carr & S.G.M.Carr) K.D.Hill & L.A.S.Johnson (Qld., N.T., W.A.)
- Corymbia gummifera (Gaertn.) K.D.Hill & L.A.S.Johnson – red bloodwood (Qld., N.S.W., Vic.)
- Corymbia haematoxylon (Maiden) K.D.Hill & L.A.S.Johnson – mountain marri (W.A.)
- Corymbia hamersleyana (D.J.Carr & S.G.M.Carr) K.D.Hill & L.A.S.Johnson (W.A.)
- Corymbia hendersonii (K.D.Hill & L.A.S.Johnson – Henderson's bloodwood (Qld.)
- Corymbia henryi (S.T.Blake) K.D.Hill & L.A.S.Johnson – large-leaved spotted gum (Qld., N.S.W.)
- Corymbia hylandii (D.J.Carr & S.G.M.Carr) K.D.Hill & L.A.S.Johnson – Hyland's bloodwood (Qld.)
- Corymbia intermedia (R.T.Baker) K.D.Hill & L.A.S.Johnson – pink bloodwood (Qld., N.S.W.)
- Corymbia jacobsiana (Blakely) K.D.Hill & L.A.S.Johnson – Jacob's bloodwood, stringybark bloodwood (N.T.)
- Corymbia karelgica K.D.Hill & L.A.S.Johnson (W.A.)
- Corymbia kombolgiensis (Brooker & Dunlop) K.D.Hill & L.A.S.Johnson – scarp gum, paper-fruited bloodwood (N.T.)
- Corymbia lamprophylla (Brooker & A.R.Bean) K.D.Hill & L.A.S.Johnson – shiny-leaved bloodwood (Qld.)
- Corymbia latifolia (F.Muell.) K.D.Hill & L.A.S.Johnson – round-leaved bloodwood, round leaf bloodwood, wubam (W.A., N.T., Qld., Papua New Guinea)
- Corymbia leichhardtii (Bailey) K.D.Hill & L.A.S.Johnson – rustyjacket, Leichhardt's rustyjacket, yellow jacket (Qld.)
- Corymbia lenziana (D.J.Carr & S.G.M.Carr) K.D.Hill & L.A.S.Johnson – narrow-leaved bloodwood (W.A.)
- Corymbia leptoloma (Brooker & A.R.Bean) K.D.Hill & L.A.S.Johnson – yellowjacket, Paluma Range yellowjacket (Qld.)
- Corymbia ligans K.D.Hill & L.A.S.Johnson (Qld.)
- Corymbia maculata (Hook.) K.D.Hill & L.A.S.Johnson – spotted gum (N.S.W., Vic.)
- Corymbia nesophila (Blakely) K.D.Hill & L.A.S.Johnson – Melville Island bloodwood (W.A., N.T., Qld.)
- Corymbia novoguinensis (D.J.Carr & S.G.M.Carr) K.D.Hill & L.A.S.Johnson (Qld., New Guinea)
- Corymbia oocarpa (D.J.Carr & S.G.M.Carr) K.D.Hill & L.A.S.Johnson (N.T.)
- Corymbia opaca (D.J.Carr & S.G.M.Carr) K.D.Hill & L.A.S.Johnson – desert bloodwood (W.A., N.T., S.A.)
- Corymbia pachycarpa K.D.Hill & L.A.S.Johnson – urn-fruited bloodwood, mawurru, yilanggi, warlamarn (W.A., N.T.)
- Corymbia papillosa K.D.Hill & L.A.S.Johnson – Maningrida bloodwood (W.A., N.T.)
- Corymbia papuana K.D.Hill & L.A.S.Johnson – ghost gum (Qld., New Guinea)
- Corymbia paractia K.D.Hill & L.A.S.Johnson – Cable Beach ghost gum (W.A.)
- Corymbia pauciseta K.D.Hill & L.A.S.Johnson (N.T.)
- Corymbia peltata (Benth.) K.D.Hill & L.A.S.Johnson – yellowjacket, rustyjacket (Qld.)
- Corymbia petalophylla (Brooker & A.R.Bean) K.D.Hill & L.A.S.Johnson (Qld.)
- Corymbia plena K.D.Hill & L.A.S.Johnson (Qld.)
- Corymbia pocillum (D.J.Carr & S.G.M.Carr) K.D.Hill & L.A.S.Johnson (Qld.)
- Corymbia polycarpa (F.Muell.) K.D.Hill & L.A.S.Johnson – long-fruited bloodwood, small-flowered bloodwood (W.A., N.T., Qld.)
- Corymbia polysciada (F.Muell.) K.D.Hill & L.A.S.Johnson – apple gum, paper-fruited bloodwood, bolomin (N.T.)
- Corymbia porrecta (S.T.Blake) K.D.Hill & L.A.S.Johnson – grey bloodwood (N.T.)
- Corymbia ptychocarpa (F.Muell.) K.D.Hill & L.A.S.Johnson – swamp bloodwood, spring bloodwood (W.A., N.T., Qld.)
- Corymbia rhodops (D.J.Carr & S.G.M.Carr) K.D.Hill & L.A.S.Johnson – red-throated bloodwood (Qld.)
- Corymbia scabrida (Brooker & A.R.Bean) K.D.Hill & L.A.S.Johnson – rough-leaved yellowjacket (Qld.)
- Corymbia serendipita (Brooker & Kleinig) A.R.Bean (Qld.)
- Corymbia setosa (Schauer) K.D.Hill & L.A.S.Johnson – rough leaved bloodwood, desert bloodwood (N.T., Qld.)
- Corymbia sphaerica K.D.Hill & L.A.S.Johnson – big-fruited bloodwood (N.T.)
- Corymbia stockeri (D.J.Carr & S.G.M.Carr) K.D.Hill & L.A.S.Johnson – blotchy bloodwood (Qld.)
- Corymbia terminalis (F.Muell.) K.D.Hill & L.A.S.Johnson – tjuta, joolta, bloodwood, desert bloodwood, plains bloodwood, northern bloodwood, western bloodwood, inland bloodwood (N.T., Qld., N.S.W., S.A.)
- Corymbia tessellaris (F.Muell.) K.D.Hill & L.A.S.Johnson – carbeen, Moreton Bay ash (Qld., N.S.W., New Guinea)
- Corymbia torelliana (F.Muell.) K.D.Hill & L.A.S.Johnson – cadaghi, cadaga (Qld.)
- Corymbia torta K.D.Hill & L.A.S.Johnson (W.A.)
- Corymbia trachyphloia (F.Muell.) K.D.Hill & L.A.S.Johnson – brown bloodwood (Qld., N.S.W.)
- Corymbia umbonata (D.J.Carr & S.G.M.Carr) K.D.Hill & L.A.S.Johnson – rusty bloodwood (N.T.)
- Corymbia watsoniana (F.Muell.) K.D.Hill & L.A.S.Johnson – large-fruited yellowjacket (Qld.)
- Corymbia xanthope (A.R.Bean & Brooker) K.D.Hill & L.A.S.Johnson – Glen Geddes bloodwood (Qld.)
- Corymbia zygophylla (Blakely) K.D.Hill & L.A.S.Johnson – Broome bloodwood (W.A.)

== See also ==
Cultivars

- Corymbia 'Summer Red'

Other reading

- List of Eucalyptus species
