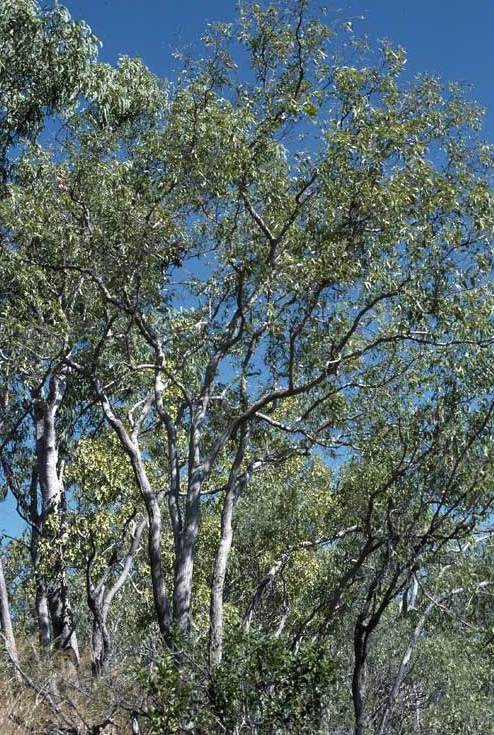
- Corymbia jacobsiana near Pine Creek

Scientific classification
- Kingdom: Plantae
- Clade: Embryophytes
- Clade: Tracheophytes
- Clade: Spermatophytes
- Clade: Angiosperms
- Clade: Eudicots
- Clade: Rosids
- Order: Myrtales
- Family: Myrtaceae
- Genus: Corymbia
- Species: C. jacobsiana

Binomial name
- Corymbia jacobsiana (Blakely) K.D.Hill & L.A.S.Johnson

Synonyms
- Eucalyptus jacobsiana Blakely

= Corymbia jacobsiana =

Jacob's bloodwood

Species of plant

Corymbia jacobsiana, commonly known as Jacob's bloodwood or stringybark bloodwood, is a species of tree that is endemic to the Northern Territory. It has rough, stringy bark on the trunk and branches, lance-shaped to elliptical or curved adult leaves, flower buds in groups of three or seven, creamy white flowers and urn-shaped fruit.

== Description ==
Corymibia jacobsiana is a tree that typically grows to a height of 20 m (66 ft) and forms a lignotuber and rhizomes. It has rough, stringy, yellow-brown to grey-brown bark on the trunk and branches. Young plants and coppice regrowth have hairy, glossy dark green leaves that are paler on the lower surface, arranged in opposite pairs, linear, 45–105 mm (1.8–4.1 in) long and 2–8 mm (0.079–0.315 in) wide on a short petiole. Adult leaves are arranged alternately, glossy dark green above, much paler on the lower surface, lance-shaped to elliptical or curved, 53–137 mm (2.1–5.4 in) long and 7–20 mm (0.28–0.79 in) wide, tapering to a petiole 4–23 mm (0.16–0.91 in) long. The flower buds are arranged on the ends of branchlets on a branched peduncle 4–13 mm (0.16–0.51 in) long, each branch of the peduncle with three or seven buds on pedicels 2–8 mm (0.079–0.315 in) long. Mature buds are oval to pear-shaped or spherical, about 4 mm (0.16 in) long and 2 mm (0.079 in) wide with a rounded to conical or beaked operculum. The tree is thought to flower between February and April and the flowers are creamy white. The fruit is a woody urn-shaped capsule 7–11 mm (0.28–0.43 in) long and 4–8 mm (0.16–0.31 in) wide with the valves enclosed in the fruit. The seeds are flattened, dull to semi-glossy and red or red-brown and saucer-shaped.

Corymbia jacobsiana has no close relatives. It is solated from all other bloodwoods by the combination of rough stringybark and sparsely hairy juvenile leaves, carpeted on the underside with white hairs.

== Taxonomy and naming ==
Jacob's bloodwood was first formally described by the botanist William Blakely in 1934 in his book, A Key to the Eucalypts and given the name Eucalyptus jacobsiana. The type specimens were collected by "Dr. M. R. Jacobs" 10 mi (16 km) north of Pine Creek in 1933. Jacobs was a distinguished forester and the Principal of the Australian Forestry School in Canberra from 1945 to 1961. Botanists Ken Hill and Lawrie Johnson were the first to define the genus Corymbia in 1995, identifying the bloodwoods, ghost gums and spotted gums as a group distinct from Eucalyptus. They changed the name of this species to Corymbia jacobsiana.

== Distribution ==
Corymbia jacobsiana occurs throughout the top end of the Northern Territory, usually in monsoonal woodland areas and usually as part of a tropical savannah woodland mix with eucalypts and cypress, growing in sand or clay soils or in dissected sandstone. It has an erratic distribution around Pine Creek, Tipperary Station and further east in Arnhem Land, often found with Corymbia arnhemensis and C. nesophila.

The plant's rhizomes allow it to form dense clones following fires, and that later thin out to form woodlands.

== See also ==
- List of Corymbia species
