= Corymbia pauciseta =

Scientific classification
- Kingdom: Plantae
- Clade: Tracheophytes
- Clade: Angiosperms
- Clade: Eudicots
- Clade: Rosids
- Order: Myrtales
- Family: Myrtaceae
- Genus: Corymbia
- Species: C. pauciseta

Binomial name
- Corymbia pauciseta K.D.Hill & L.A.S.Johnson

Synonyms
- Eucalyptus clavigera var. diffusa Blakely & Jacobs; Eucalyptus pauciseta K.D.Hill & L.A.S.Johnson MS

Species of plant

Corymbia pauciseta is a species of small tree that is endemic to north-eastern Arnhem Land in the Northern Territory. It has rough, tessellated bark on part or all of the trunk, smooth white bark above, a crown of intermediate and adult leaves, flower buds in groups of seven, creamy white flowers and cylindrical to barrel-shaped fruit.

== Description ==
Corymbia pauciseta is a tree that typically grows to a height of 6 m (20 ft) and forms a lignotuber. It has rough, grey, tessellated bark on some or all of the trunk, smooth creamy white to pale grey bark above. The crown of the tree has both intermediate and adult leaves that are the same shade of dull green on both sides, heart-shaped, egg-shaped or lance-shaped, 90–195 mm (3.5–7.7 in) long, 27–90 mm (1.1–3.5 in) wide and sessile or on a petiole up to 5 mm (0.20 in) long. The tree usually loses its leaves in the dry season. The flower buds are arranged in leaf axils on a branched peduncle 2–15 mm (0.079–0.591 in) long, each branch of the peduncle with seven buds on pedicels 9–32 mm (0.35–1.26 in) long. Mature buds are pear-shaped, 6–7 mm (0.24–0.28 in) long and 4–5 mm (0.16–0.20 in) wide with a rounded operculum. Flowering has been observed in October and November and the flowers are creamy white. The fruit is a thin-walled capsule 8–15 mm (0.31–0.59 in) long and 7–12 mm (0.28–0.47 in) wide with the valves enclosed in the fruit.

== Taxonomy and naming ==
Corymbia pauciseta was first formally described in 1995 by Ken Hill and Lawrie Johnson. The specific epithet (pauciseta) is from the Latin paucus meaning "few" and seta "bristle", referring to the leaves and shoots of this species compared to those of Corymbia confertiflora.

== Distribution and habitat ==
This eucalypt mainly grows in low woodland usually in flat places. It is locally common but occurs sporadically in the north-eastern Northern Territory, between Maningrida and Gove but mainly in Arnhem Land.

== See also ==
- List of Corymbia species
