= Corymbia porrecta =

Grey bloodwood

Scientific classification
- Kingdom: Plantae
- Clade: Embryophytes
- Clade: Tracheophytes
- Clade: Spermatophytes
- Clade: Angiosperms
- Clade: Eudicots
- Clade: Rosids
- Order: Myrtales
- Family: Myrtaceae
- Genus: Corymbia
- Species: C. porrecta

Binomial name
- Corymbia porrecta (S.T.Blake) K.D.Hill & L.A.S.Johnson

Synonyms
- Eucalyptus porrecta S.T.Blake

Species of plant

Corymbia porrecta, commonly known as grey bloodwood, is a species of small tree that is endemic to the Northern Territory. It has rough, tessellated bark on the trunk and branches, broadly lance-shaped to egg-shaped adult leaves, flower buds usually in groups of seven, creamy white flowers and urn-shaped to barrel-shaped fruit.

== Description ==
Corymbia porrecta is a tree that grows to a height of 20 m (66 ft) but often much less, and forms a lignotuber. It has rough, tessellated greyish bark on the trunk and branches. Young plants and coppice regrowth have egg-shaped leaves that are 180–250 mm (7.1–9.8 in) long, 110–170 mm (4.3–6.7 in) wide and petiolate. Adult leaves are arranged alternately, more or less the same shade of glossy green on both sides, broadly lance-shaped to egg-shaped, 90–235 mm (3.5–9.3 in) long and 30–85 mm (1.2–3.3 in) wide, tapering to a petiole 17–35 mm (0.67–1.38 in) long. The flower buds are arranged on the ends of branchlets on a branched peduncle 6–35 mm (0.24–1.38 in) long, each branch of the peduncle with seven, rarely nine, buds on pedicels 4–22 mm (0.16–0.87 in) long. Mature buds are oval to pear-shaped, 10–15 mm (0.39–0.59 in) long and 7–9 mm (0.28–0.35 in) wide with a rounded to conical operculum. Flowering occurs from January to April and the flowers are creamy white. The fruit is a woody urn-shaped, barrel-shaped or shortened spherical capsule 18–30 mm (0.71–1.18 in) long and 15–26 mm (0.59–1.02 in) wide.

== Taxonomy and naming ==
This bloodwood was first formally described in 1953 by Stanley Thatcher Blake who gave it the name Eucalyptus porrecta and published the description in the Australian Journal of Botany. In 1995 Ken Hill and Lawrence Alexander Sidney Johnson changed the name to Corymbia porrecta. The specific epithet is from the Latin porrectus meaning "stretched outwards and forward", possibly referring to the long broad leaves of the crown.

== Distribution and habitat ==
The grey bloodwood usually grows in tall woodland on sandy, gravelly soils in the north-west of the Northern Territory, between Litchfield and Darwin, east to Jabiru, the Coburg Peninsula and on Bathurst and Melville Islands.

== Ecology ==
Following a fire the tree is a facultative resprouter depending on conditions such as moisture and the fire intensity.

== See also ==
- List of Corymbia species
