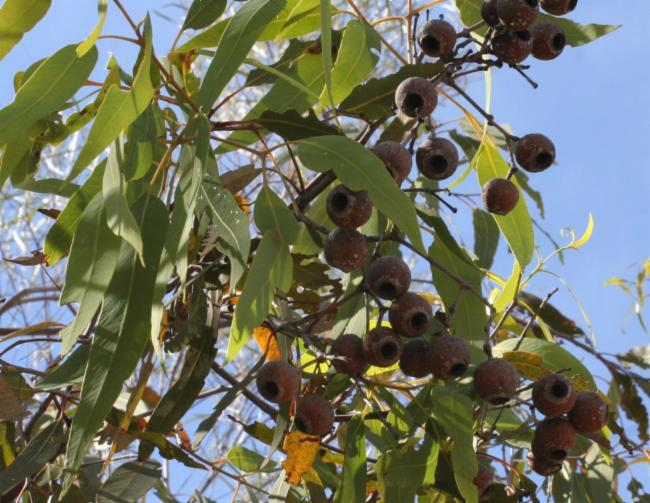
- Eucalyptus cliftoniana in Purnululu National Park

Scientific classification
- Kingdom: Plantae
- Clade: Tracheophytes
- Clade: Angiosperms
- Clade: Eudicots
- Clade: Rosids
- Order: Myrtales
- Family: Myrtaceae
- Genus: Corymbia
- Species: C. cliftoniana

Binomial name
- Corymbia cliftoniana (W.Fitzg.) K.D.Hill & L.A.S.Johnson

Synonyms
- Eucalyptus cliftoniana W.Fitzg.; Eucalyptus pontis D.J.Carr & S.G.M.Carr; Eucalyptus pyrophora auct. non Benth.

= Corymbia cliftoniana =

Species of plant

Corymbia cliftoniana is a species of tree that is endemic to northern Australia. It has thick, rough, tessellated bark on the trunk and branches, narrow lance-shaped adult leaves, flower buds in groups of seven, creamy white flowers and shortened spherical fruit.

== Description ==
Corymbia clifftoniana is a tree that typically grows to a height of 8–12 m (26–39 ft) and forms a lignotuber. It has thick, rough, tessellated, flaky bark on the trunk and branches. Young plants and coppice regrowth have heart-shaped to egg-shaped, later lance-shaped leaves that are densely hairy on both sides, 40–113 mm (1.6–4.4 in) long, 25–60 mm (0.98–2.36 in) wide and arranged in opposite pairs. Adult leaves are the same shade of dull green on both sides, narrow lance-shaped, 78–150 mm (3.1–5.9 in) long, 10–26 mm (0.39–1.02 in) wide, tapering to a petiole 10–29 mm (0.39–1.14 in) long. The flower buds are arranged on the ends of branchlets on a thin, branched peduncle 8–25 mm (0.31–0.98 in) long, each branch of the peduncle with seven buds on pedicels 3–8 mm (0.12–0.31 in) long. Mature buds are oval to pear-shaped, about 6 mm (0.24 in) long and 4 mm (0.16 in) wide with a rounded, sometimes pointed operculum. Flowering occurs in January and the flowers are creamy white. The fruit is a woody, shortened spherical capsule 15–25 mm (0.59–0.98 in) long and wide with the valves enclosed in the fruit.

== Taxonomy and naming ==
This eucalypt was first formally described in 1919 by William Vincent Fitzgerald in Joseph Maiden's book A Critical Revision of the Genus Eucalyptus and given the name Eucalyptus cliftoniana. In 1995 Kenneth Hill and Lawrence Alexander Sidney Johnson changed the name to Corymbia cliftoniana in the journal Telopea. The specific epithet (cliftoniana) honours R.C. Clifton, a Western Australian public servant.

== Distribution and habitat ==
Corymbia cliftoniana grows on sandstone and limestone cliffs and escarpments from near Derby in the Kimberley region of Western Australia to the Victoria River region of the Northern Territory. It is common in the Bungle Bungle Range.

== See also ==
- List of Corymbia species
