= Corymbia oocarpa =

Scientific classification
- Kingdom: Plantae
- Clade: Embryophytes
- Clade: Tracheophytes
- Clade: Spermatophytes
- Clade: Angiosperms
- Clade: Eudicots
- Clade: Rosids
- Order: Myrtales
- Family: Myrtaceae
- Genus: Corymbia
- Species: C. oocarpa

Binomial name
- Corymbia oocarpa (D.J.Carr & S.G.M.Carr) K.D.Hill & L.A.S.Johnson

Synonyms
- Eucalyptus oocarpa D.J.Carr & S.G.M.Carr

Species of plant

Corymbia oocarpa is a species of tree that is endemic to the Top End of the Northern Territory. It has thin rough bark on the lower part of the trunk, smooth bark above, lance-shaped to curved adult leaves, flower buds in groups of seven, white flowers and barrel-shaped to urn-shaped fruit.

== Description ==
Corymbia oocarpa is a tree that typically grows to a height of 15 m (49 ft) and forms a lignotuber. It has thin, rough grey to orange-brown that is thinly tessellated towards the base of the trunk, smooth grey and cream-coloured above. Young plants and coppice regrowth have egg-shaped to lance-shaped leaves that are 55–95 mm (2.2–3.7 in) long, 13–20 mm (0.51–0.79 in) wide and petiolate. Adult leaves are arranged alternately, more or less the same shade of glossy green on both sides, lance-shaped to curved, 100–220 mm (3.9–8.7 in) long and 9–27 mm (0.35–1.06 in) wide, tapering to a petiole 8–26 mm (0.31–1.02 in) long. The flower buds are arranged on the ends of branchlets on a branched peduncle 6–18 mm (0.24–0.71 in) long, each branch of the peduncle with seven buds on thin pedicels 3–12 mm (0.12–0.47 in) long. Mature buds are pear-shaped to oval, about 7 mm (0.28 in) long and 5 mm (0.20 in) wide with a rounded operculum, often with a small point in the centre. Flowering has been observed in March and the flowers are white. The fruit is a woody barrel-shaped to urn-shaped capsule 10–14 mm (0.39–0.55 in) long and 8–11 mm (0.31–0.43 in) wide and smooth, with the valves enclosed.

== Taxonomy and naming ==
This species was first formally described as Eucalyptus oocarpa in 1987 by Denis Carr and Stella Carr from specimens collected in the Katherine Gorge National Park in 1967 by Norman Byrnes. In 1995 Ken Hill and Lawrie Johnson changed the name to Corymbia oocarpa.

== Distribution and habitat ==
Corymbia oocarpa grows in sand in depressions on or near hard outcrops of sandstone. The range of the tree is confined to an area in the Top End of the Northern Territory, extending from coastal area near Mudginberry south through Pine Creek, the Arnhem Plateau to Katherine Gorge.

== See also ==
- List of Corymbia species
