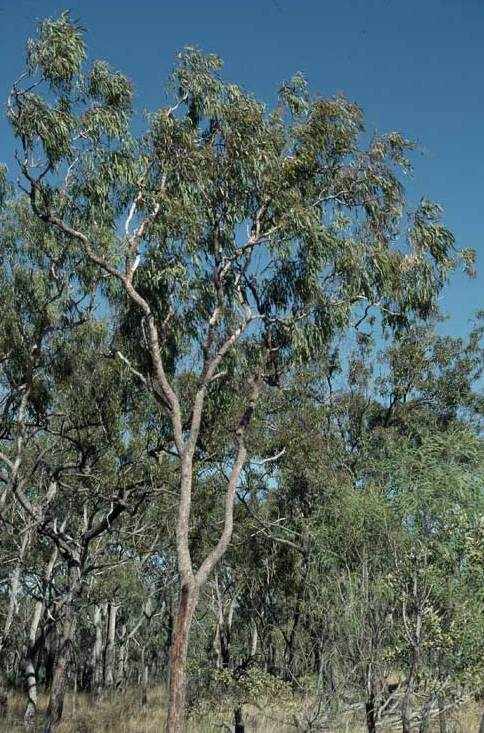

Scientific classification
- Kingdom: Plantae
- Clade: Tracheophytes
- Clade: Angiosperms
- Clade: Eudicots
- Clade: Rosids
- Order: Myrtales
- Family: Myrtaceae
- Genus: Corymbia
- Species: C. umbonata

Binomial name
- Corymbia umbonata (D.J.Carr & S.G.M.Carr) K.D.Hill & L.A.S.Johnson

Synonyms
- Eucalyptus ollaris D.J.Carr & S.G.M.Carr; Eucalyptus umbonata D.J.Carr & S.G.M.Carr

= Corymbia umbonata =

Rusty bloodwood

Species of plant

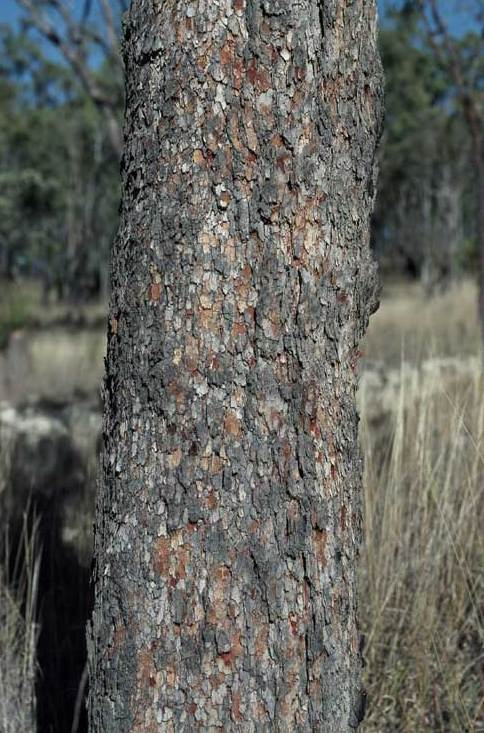
bark

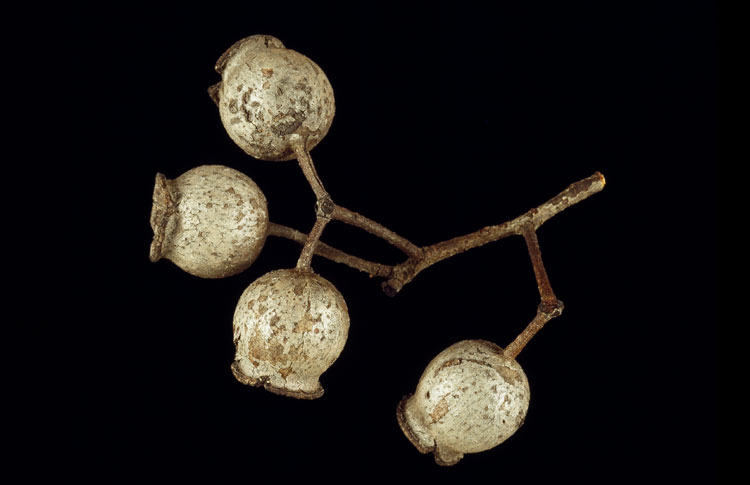
fruit

Corymbia umbonata, commonly known as rusty bloodwood, is a species of tree that is endemic to the Top End of the Northern Territory. It has thin, rough bark on the trunk, often also the branches, lance-shaped or curved adult leaves, flower buds in groups of seven, creamy white flowers and urn-shaped fruit.

== Description ==
Corymbia umbonata is a tree that typically grows to a height of 17 m (56 ft) and forms a lignotuber. It has thin, rough, tessellated bark on the trunk, often also on the branches, smooth creamy pink to pale grey bark above. Young plants and coppice regrowth have egg-shaped to elliptical leaves that are 55–150 mm (2.2–5.9 in) long, 25–55 mm (0.98–2.17 in) wide and petiolate. Adult leaves are lance-shaped or curved, 90–230 mm (3.5–9.1 in) long and 8–20 mm (0.31–0.79 in) wide, tapering to a petiole 14–40 mm (0.55–1.57 in) long. The flower buds are arranged on the ends of branchlets on a branched peduncle 2–11 mm (0.079–0.433 in) long, each branch of the peduncle 55–150 mm (2.2–5.9 in) long and 25–55 mm (0.98–2.17 in) wide, usually with seven buds on pedicels 3–13 mm (0.12–0.51 in) long. Mature buds are oval to pear-shaped, 6–8 mm (0.24–0.31 in) long and 5–6 mm (0.20–0.24 in) wide with a rounded operculum. Flowering has been observed in March and April and the flowers are creamy white. The fruit is an urn-shaped capsule 12–19 mm (0.47–0.75 in) long and 11–16 mm (0.43–0.63 in) wide with the valves enclosed in the fruit.

== Taxonomy and naming ==
The rusty bloodwood was first formally described in 1985 by Denis John Carr and Stella Grace Maisie Carr who gave it the name Eucalyptus umbonata and published the description in their book, Eucalyptus 1 - New or little-known species of the Corymbosae. The type specimens were collected by Laurence Adams near Katherine in 1964. In 1995, Ken Hill and Lawrie Johnson changed the name to Corymbia umbonata, publishing the change in the journal Telopea.

== Distribution and habitat ==
Corymbia umbonata grows in open forest and savannah woodland in the Top End of the Northern Territory, including in the Judbarra / Gregory, Kakadu and Nitmiluk National Parks.

== See also ==
- List of Corymbia species
