= Corymbia paractia =

Cable Beach ghost gum

Conservation status
- Near Threatened (IUCN 3.1)

- Priority One — Poorly Known Taxa (DEC)

Scientific classification
- Kingdom: Plantae
- Clade: Tracheophytes
- Clade: Angiosperms
- Clade: Eudicots
- Clade: Rosids
- Order: Myrtales
- Family: Myrtaceae
- Genus: Corymbia
- Species: C. paractia

Binomial name
- Corymbia paractia K.D.Hill & L.A.S.Johnson

Species of plant

Corymbia paractia, commonly known as Cable Beach ghost gum, is a species of low-growing tree that is endemic to the Kimberley region of Western Australia. It has smooth white to pale grey bark, sometimes with rough bark near the base of the trunk, lance-shaped adult leaves, flower buds in groups of three or seven, creamy white flowers and cup-shaped, barrel-shaped or cylindrical fruit.

== Description ==
Corymbia paractia is a tree, often with several stems, that typically grows to a height of 4–6 m (13–20 ft), sometimes to 12 m (39 ft), and forms a lignotuber. It has smooth creamy white to pale grey bark that is shed in thin scales, sometimes with thin, rough, flaky brownish bark near the base of the trunk. Young plants and coppice regrowth have hairy, egg-shaped to elliptical leaves that are dull green, 50–110 mm (2.0–4.3 in) long, 40–60 mm (1.6–2.4 in) wide and petiolate. The crown of the tree has both intermediate and adult leaves. Adult leaves are the same shade of dull green on both sides, lance-shaped, 75–140 mm (3.0–5.5 in) long and 14–55 mm (0.55–2.17 in) wide on a petiole 4–12 mm (0.16–0.47 in) long. The tree usually loses its leaves in the dry season. The flower buds are arranged in the leaf axils of leafless branchlets on a branched peduncle 1–8 mm (0.039–0.315 in) long, each branch of the peduncle with three or seven buds on pedicels 5–15 mm (0.20–0.59 in) long. Mature buds are pear-shaped, 5–7 mm (0.20–0.28 in) long and 4–5 mm (0.16–0.20 in) wide with a rounded operculum, sometimes with a small point in its centre. Flowering occurs between April and May or October and December and the flowers are creamy white. The fruit is a cup-shaped, barrel-shaped or cylindrical capsule 7–11 mm (0.28–0.43 in) long and 6–9 mm (0.24–0.35 in) wide with thin walls and the valves enclosed in the fruit.

== Taxonomy and naming ==
Corymbia paractia was first formally in 1995 by Ken Hill and Lawrie Johnson. The specific epithet (paractia) is from the Greek paraktios meaning "on the seaside", referring to the habitat of this species.

== Distribution and habitat ==
Cable Beach ghost gum is confined to a small area on the Kimberley coast, near Broome, where it grows in skeletal soils in the area between the coastal beach sand dunes and the red pindan soils.

== Conservation status ==
This eucalypt is classified as "Priority One" by the Government of Western Australia Department of Parks and Wildlife, meaning that it is known from only one or a few locations which are potentially at risk. The IUCN Red List assesses the species as Near Threatened.

== See also ==
- List of Corymbia species
