= Corymbia sphaerica =

Big-fruited bloodwood

Scientific classification
- Kingdom: Plantae
- Clade: Tracheophytes
- Clade: Angiosperms
- Clade: Eudicots
- Clade: Rosids
- Order: Myrtales
- Family: Myrtaceae
- Genus: Corymbia
- Species: C. sphaerica

Binomial name
- Corymbia sphaerica K.D.Hill & L.A.S.Johnson

Species of plant

Corymbia sphaerica, commonly known as big-fruited bloodwood, is a species of tree, sometimes a mallee or shrub, that is endemic to a small area in the Northern Territory of Australia. It has rough bark on the trunk and branches, a crown of heart-shaped to lance-shaped juvenile leaves, flower buds in groups of three and shortened spherical fruit.

== Description ==
Corymbia sphaerica is a tree that typically grows to a height of 10 m (33 ft), sometimes a mallee or a shrub to only 1 m (3 ft 3 in), and forms a lignotuber. It has rough, tessellated, brownish bark on the trunk and branches. Young plants and coppice regrowth have sessile, heart-shaped to more or less round, greyish green leaves that are about 80 mm (3.1 in) long and 50 mm (2.0 in) wide, arranged in opposite pairs. It has a crown of juvenile leaves that are sessile, heart-shaped to almost lance-shaped, the same shade of dull green on both sides, 30–70 mm (1.2–2.8 in) long and 15–45 mm (0.59–1.77 in) wide. The flowers are arranged on the ends of branches on a branched peduncle 4–15 mm (0.16–0.59 in) long, each branch of the peduncle with three buds on pedicels 2–12 mm (0.079–0.472 in) long. Mature buds are spherical, 10–12 mm (0.39–0.47 in) long and 9–10 mm (0.35–0.39 in) wide with a rounded operculum. The fruit is a shortened spherical capsule 20–31 mm (0.79–1.22 in) long and wide with the valves enclosed in the fruit. The seeds are brown, 9–16 mm (0.35–0.63 in) long with a wing on the end.

== Taxonomy and naming ==
Corymbia sphaerica was first formally described in 1995 by Ken Hill and Lawrie Johnson in the journal Telopea from specimens collected in 1988 by Peter Latz, near Lake Surprise. The specific epithet (sphaerica) is from the latinised Greek sphaericus meaning "spherical", referring to the flower buds and fruit.

== Distribution and habitat ==
Corymbia sphaerica grows in scrubland on red sandy soil on rises, and is found in the central Northern Territory from the eastern edge of the Tanami Desert to the Barrow Creek area. It occurs in the |Burt River, Davenport Murchison Ranges, Sturt Plateau and Tanami biogeographic regions bioregions.

== Ecology ==
Following fire, this eucalypt is a facultative resprouter sending up epicormic sprouts from its lignotuber.

== See also ==
- List of Corymbia species
