= Corymbia dendromerinx =

Scientific classification
- Kingdom: Plantae
- Clade: Embryophytes
- Clade: Tracheophytes
- Clade: Spermatophytes
- Clade: Angiosperms
- Clade: Eudicots
- Clade: Rosids
- Order: Myrtales
- Family: Myrtaceae
- Genus: Corymbia
- Species: C. dendromerinx

Binomial name
- Corymbia dendromerinx K.D.Hill & L.A.S.Johnson

Species of plant

Corymbia dendromerinx, commonly known as ghost gum, is a species of tree that is endemic to the south-western Kimberley region of Western Australia. It has smooth bark, sometimes with a stocking of rough bark near the base, a crown of variably-shaped leaves, flower buds mostly in groups of seven, creamy white flowers and barrel-shaped, cylindrical or cup-shaped fruit.

== Description ==
Corymbia dendromerinx is a tree that typically grows to a height of 4–12 m (13–39 ft) and forms a lignotuber. It has smooth white to cream-coloured bark that is shed in small sheets, sometimes with a stocking of rough, scaly bark near the base, the rough bark not clearly demarcated from the smooth bark, as in similar ghost gums. Young plants and coppice regrowth have heart-shaped to egg-shaped leaves that are 100–225 mm (3.9–8.9 in) long, 55–130 mm (2.2–5.1 in) wide, arranged in opposite pairs and with a petiole 2–10 mm (0.079–0.394 in) long. The crown of the tree has intermediate and adult leaves that are arranged in opposite pairs or alternately and vary in shape from heart-shaped to lance-shaped, 60–150 mm (2.4–5.9 in) long and 36–85 mm (1.4–3.3 in) wide on a petiole 2–12 mm (0.079–0.472 in) long. The flowers are borne on leafless branchlets in large clusters on branched peduncles 1–11 mm (0.039–0.433 in) long, each branch of the peduncle with buds mostly in groups of seven, the buds on pedicels 6–18 mm (0.24–0.71 in) long. Mature buds are pear-shaped to oval, 5–7 mm (0.20–0.28 in) long and 4–6 mm (0.16–0.24 in) wide with a rounded to flattened operculum. Flowering has been observed from October to December and the flowers are creamy white. The fruit is a woody barrel-shaped, cylindrical or cup-shaped capsule 7–12 mm (0.28–0.47 in) long and 6–8 mm (0.24–0.31 in) wide with the valves enclosed in the fruit.

== Taxonomy and naming ==
Corymbia dendromerinx was first formally described in 1995 by Kenneth Hill and Lawrence Alexander Sidney Johnson in the journal Telopea. The specific epithet (dendromerinx) is derived from the Greek, meaning "a tree" and "a bristle", referring to the tree-like appearance of the bristles on the leaves when magnified.

== Distribution and habitat ==
This ghost gum grows mostly on plains and flat sites in the south-west Kimberley region, and prefers alluvial soils or red loams. It is abundant to the west of Fitzroy Crossing and south of the Wunaamin Miliwundi Ranges.

== See also ==
- List of Corymbia species
