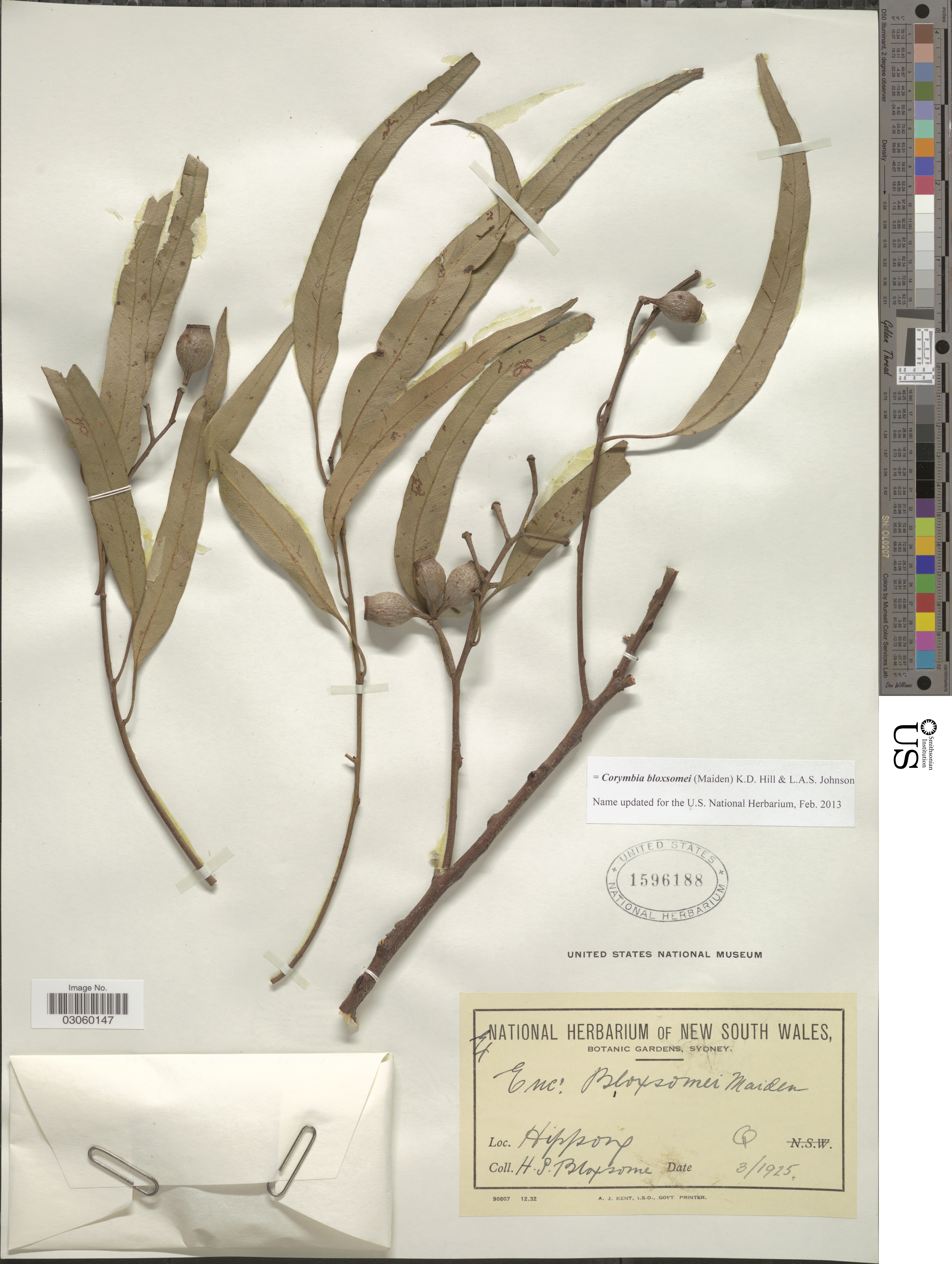

Scientific classification
- Kingdom: Plantae
- Clade: Embryophytes
- Clade: Tracheophytes
- Clade: Spermatophytes
- Clade: Angiosperms
- Clade: Eudicots
- Clade: Rosids
- Order: Myrtales
- Family: Myrtaceae
- Genus: Corymbia
- Species: C. bloxsomei

Binomial name
- Corymbia bloxsomei (Maiden) K.D.Hill & L.A.S.Johnson

Synonyms
- Eucalyptus bloxsomei Maiden

= Corymbia bloxsomei =

Yellowjack

Species of plant

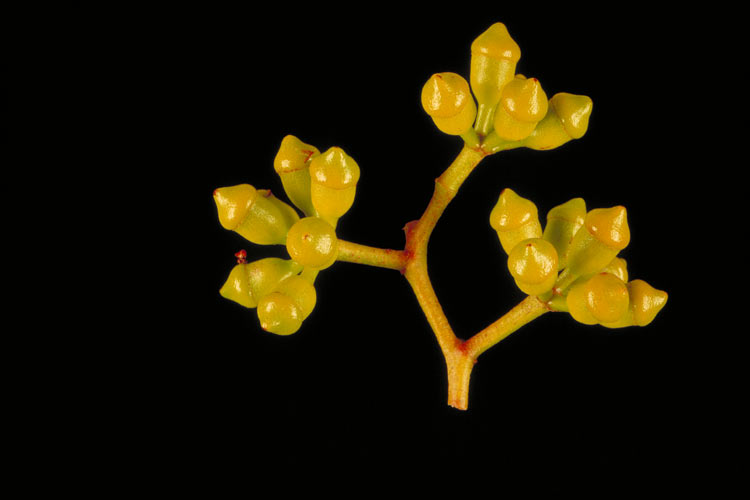
flower buds

Corymbia bloxsomei, commonly known as yellowjack, yellow jacket or yellow bloodwood, is a species of tree that is endemic to inland, south-eastern Queensland. It has thick, rough scaly bark on the trunk and larger branches, lance-shaped or curved adult leaves, flower buds in groups of seven, nine or eleven, creamy white to pale yellow flowers and barrel-shaped, urn-shaped or spherical fruit.

== Description ==
Corymbia bloxsomei is a tree that typically grows to a height of 15–24 m (49–79 ft) and forms a lignotuber. It has soft, rough, scaly or tessellated yellowish to brownish bark on the trunk and almost to the smaller branches. Young plants and coppice regrowth have leaves that are paler on the lower surface, egg-shaped to elliptical, 70–140 mm (2.8–5.5 in) long and 38–60 mm (1.5–2.4 in) wide. Adult leaves are the same shade of glossy green on both sides, lance-shaped or curved, 110–188 mm (4.3–7.4 in) long and 10–35 mm (0.39–1.38 in) wide, tapering to a petiole 13–35 mm (0.51–1.38 in) long. The flower buds are arranged on the ends of branchlets on a branched peduncle 4–23 mm (0.16–0.91 in) long, each branch of the peduncle with seven, nine or eleven buds on pedicels 1–7 mm (0.039–0.276 in) long. Mature buds are oval to cylindrical, about 9 mm (0.35 in) long and 7 mm (0.28 in) wide with a variably-shaped operculum. Flowering has been recorded in June and December and the flowers are creamy white to pale yellow. The fruit is a woody barrel-shaped, urn-shaped or spherical capsule 12–18 mm (0.47–0.71 in) long and 9–13 mm (0.35–0.51 in) wide with the valves enclosed in the fruit.

== Taxonomy and naming ==
Yellowjacket was first formally described in 1925 by Joseph Maiden in the Journal and Proceedings of the Royal Society of New South Wales and given the name Eucalyptus bloxsomei. In 1995, Ken Hill and Lawrie Johnson changed the name to Corymbia bloxsomei. The specific epithet (bloxsomei) honours "Herbert Schreiber Bloxsome".

== Distribution and habitat ==
Corymbia bloxsomei grows in forest on flat or sloping areas from near Mundubbera to Chinchilla, especially in the Barakula State Forest.

== Conservation status ==
This eucalypt is classified as of "least concern" under the Government of Queensland Nature Conservation Act 1992.

== See also ==
- List of Corymbia species
