= Corymbia serendipita =

Scientific classification
- Kingdom: Plantae
- Clade: Tracheophytes
- Clade: Angiosperms
- Clade: Eudicots
- Clade: Rosids
- Order: Myrtales
- Family: Myrtaceae
- Genus: Corymbia
- Species: C. serendipita

Binomial name
- Corymbia serendipita (Brooker & Kleinig) A.R.Bean

Synonyms
- Corymbia arnhemensis subsp. monticola K.D.Hill & L.A.S.Johnson; Eucalyptus serendipita Brooker & Kleinig

Species of plant

Corymbia serendipita is a species of tree that is endemic to north Queensland. It has rough flaky or tessellated bark on most or all of the trunk, smooth bark above, lance-shaped or curved adult leaves, flower buds in groups of seven and urn-shaped fruit.

== Description ==
Corymbia serendipita is a tree that typically grows to a height of 12 m (39 ft) and forms a lignotuber. It has thin, rough, flaky to tessellated bark on part or all of the trunk, smooth powdery white to cream-coloured or grey bark above. Young plants and coppice regrowth have lance-shaped green leaves that are paler on the lower surface, 60–120 mm (2.4–4.7 in) long and 12–18 mm (0.47–0.71 in) wide. Adult leaves are dull light green to greyish green, paler on the lower surface, lance-shaped or curved, 75–180 mm (3.0–7.1 in) long and 17–70 mm (0.67–2.76 in) wide, tapering to a petiole 10–25 mm (0.39–0.98 in) long. The flower buds are arranged on the ends of branchlets on a thin, branched peduncle 2–16 mm (0.079–0.630 in) long, each branch of the peduncle with seven buds on pedicels 1–11 mm (0.039–0.433 in) long. Mature buds are oval to pear-shaped, about 5 mm (0.20 in) long and 4 mm (0.16 in) wide with a rounded operculum, sometimes with a small point in the centre. Flowering has been observed in February. The fruit is a woody urn-shaped capsule 10–15 mm (0.39–0.59 in) long and 8–10 mm (0.31–0.39 in) wide with a short neck and the valves enclosed in the fruit.

== Taxonomy and naming ==
This bloodwood was first formally described in 1994 by Ian Brooker and David Kleinig and given the name Eucalyptus serendipita. The description was published in their book Field Guide to Eucalypts, Volume 3, from specimens they collected near Forsayth in 1992. In 2002, Anthony Bean changed the name to Corymbia serendipita in the journal Austrobaileya.

== Distribution and habitat ==
Corymbia serendipita grows in thin sandy soil on sandstone hills on the ranges between Georgetown, Einasleigh and Forsayth and south to the White Mountains.

== Conservation status ==
This species is listed as of "least concern" under the Queensland Government Nature Conservation Act 1992

== See also ==
- List of Corymbia species
