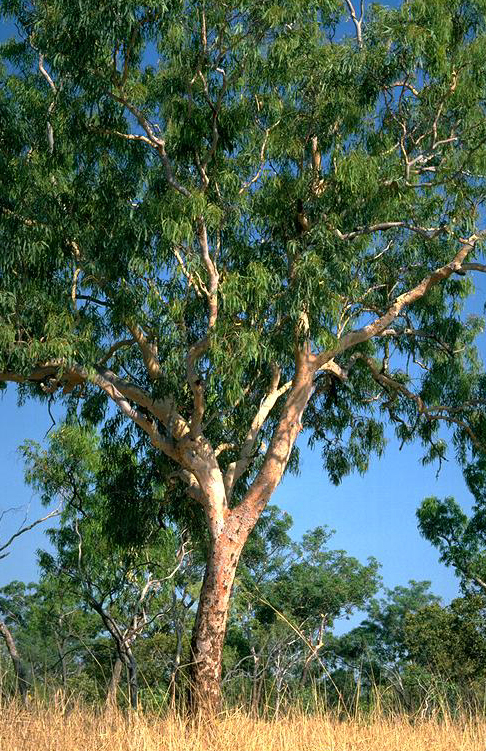
- Eucalyptus bleeseri near Katherine

Scientific classification
- Kingdom: Plantae
- Clade: Tracheophytes
- Clade: Angiosperms
- Clade: Eudicots
- Clade: Rosids
- Order: Myrtales
- Family: Myrtaceae
- Genus: Corymbia
- Species: C. bleeseri

Binomial name
- Corymbia bleeseri (Blakely) K.D.Hill & L.A.S.Johnson

Synonyms
- Eucalyptus bleeseri Blakely; Eucalyptus terminalis var. longipedata Maiden & Blakely

= Corymbia bleeseri =

Glossy-leaved bloodwood

Species of plant

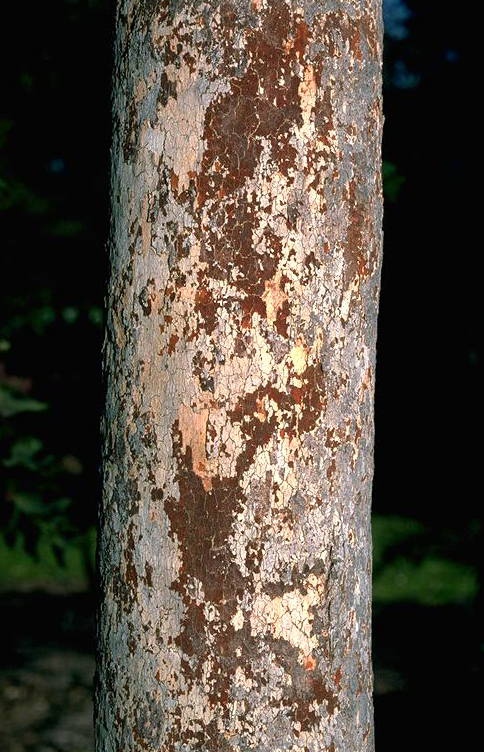
bark

Corymbia bleeseri, commonly known as glossy-leaved bloodwood or smooth-stemmed bloodwood, is a species of tree that is endemic to northern Australia. It has thin, rough bark on part or all of the trunk, smooth bark above, lance-shaped to curved adult leaves, flower buds in groups of seven, creamy white flowers and barrel-shaped fruit.

== Description ==
Corymbia bleeseri is a tree that typically grows to a height of 8 to 15 metres (26 to 49 ft) and forms a lignotuber. It has thin, rough, scaly, tessellated, greyish and red bark over part or all of the trunk, smooth white to cream-coloured or pale grey bark above. Young plants and coppice regrowth have dull greyish green, heart-shaped, egg-shaped or lance-shaped leaves that are 40–140 mm (1.6–5.5 in) long, 25–65 mm (0.98–2.56 in) wide and arranged in opposite pairs. Adult leaves are glossy green, lance-shaped to curved, 75–150 mm (3.0–5.9 in) long and 9–27 mm (0.35–1.06 in) wide, tapering to a petiole 10–28 mm (0.39–1.10 in) long. The flower buds are arranged on the ends of branchlets on a thin, branched peduncle 5–30 mm (0.20–1.18 in) long, each branch of the peduncle with seven buds on pedicels 6–30 mm (0.24–1.18 in) long. Mature buds are oval to cylindrical, 8–15 mm (0.31–0.59 in) long and 5–8 mm (0.20–0.31 in) wide with a rounded operculum. Flowering occurs between March and July and the flowers are creamy white. The fruit is a woody, barrel-shaped capsule 15–25 mm (0.59–0.98 in) long and 10–15 mm (0.39–0.59 in) wide with the valves enclosed in the fruit.

== Taxonomy and naming ==
The glossy-leaved bloodwood was first formally described in 1927 by Blakely in the Journal and Proceedings of the Royal Society of New South Wales and given the name Eucalyptus bleeseri. In 1995, Ken Hill and Lawrie Johnson changed the name to Corymbia bleeseri. The specific epithet (bleeseri) honours "Mr. F. A. K. Bleeser, Assistant Postmaster, Port Darwin, who for upwards of 38 years has taken a very keen interest in the flora and fauna of the Northern Territory".

== Distribution and habitat ==
Corymbia bleeseri grows in open forest and woodland in lateritic or sandstone soils on well-drained flats and plateaus from near Derby to Cambridge Gulf in Western Australia, in the Top End of the Northern Territory, and on nearby islands.

== See also ==
- List of Corymbia species
