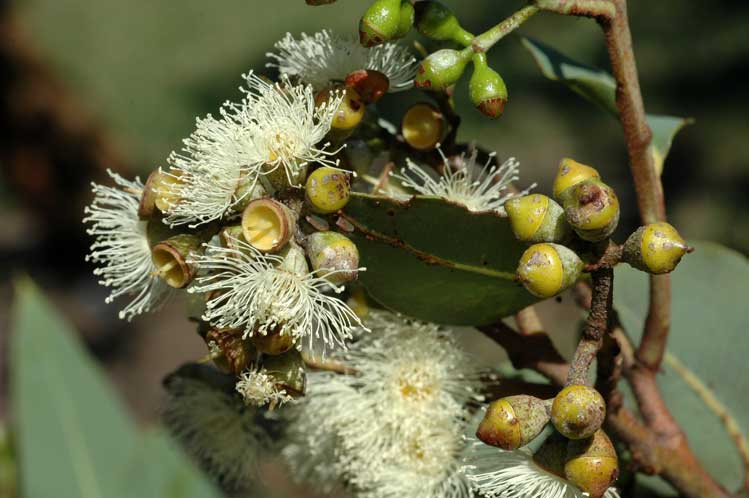
- Flower buds and flowers of Corymbia peltata

Scientific classification
- Kingdom: Plantae
- Clade: Embryophytes
- Clade: Tracheophytes
- Clade: Spermatophytes
- Clade: Angiosperms
- Clade: Eudicots
- Clade: Rosids
- Order: Myrtales
- Family: Myrtaceae
- Genus: Corymbia
- Species: C. peltata

Binomial name
- Corymbia peltata (Benth.) K.D.Hill & L.A.S.Johnson

Synonyms
- Corymbia dimorpha (Brooker & A.R.Bean) K.D.Hill & L.A.S.Johnson; Eucalyptus peltata Benth.; Eucalyptus peltata subsp. dimorpha Brooker & A.R.Bean; Eucalyptus peltata Benth. subsp. peltata; Eucalyptus melissiodora auct. non Lindl.:F.Muell.

= Corymbia peltata =

Yellowjacket

Species of plant

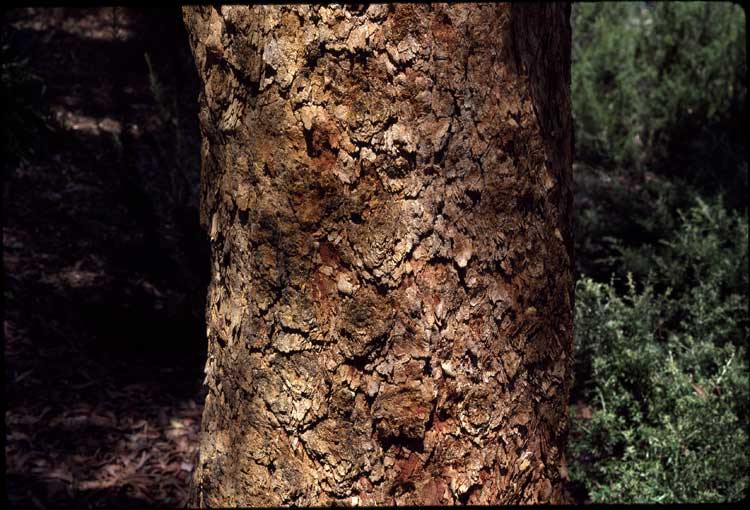
bark

Corymbia peltata, commonly known as yellowjacket or rustyjacket, is a species of small to medium-sized tree that is endemic to Queensland. It has rough, tessellated bark on the trunk and larger branches, smooth yellowish bark above, a crown of mostly juvenile egg-shaped to round leaves, flower buds in groups of seven, white flowers and barrel-shaped, urn-shaped or shortened spherical fruit.

== Description ==
Corymbia peltata is a tree that typically grows to a height of 10 m (33 ft), rarely to 20 m (66 ft) and forms a lignotuber. It has rough, tessellated or flaky bark on the trunk and larger branches, smooth yellowish bark above. Young plants and coppice regrowth have more or less round to egg-shaped or elliptical leaves that are 80–210 mm (3.1–8.3 in) long, 60–120 mm (2.4–4.7 in) wide with a rough surface and petiolate. The leaves in the crown of the tree are almost all juvenile leaves that are usually arranged in opposite pairs, the same shade of dull green on both sides, more or less round to egg-shaped or elliptical, 60–135 mm (2.4–5.3 in) long and 35–110 mm (1.4–4.3 in) wide on a petiole 10–26 mm (0.39–1.02 in) long. The flower buds are arranged the ends of branchlets on branched peduncles 8–32 mm (0.31–1.26 in) long, each branch with seven more or less sessile buds. Mature buds are oval, 6–7 mm (0.24–0.28 in) long and 4–5 mm (0.16–0.20 in) wide with an operculum that is rounded with a central knob or conical. The flowers are white and the fruit is a barrel-shaped, urn-shaped or shortened spherical capsule 7–14 mm (0.28–0.55 in) long and 8–12 mm (0.31–0.47 in) wide with the valves enclosed in the fruit.

== Taxonomy and naming ==
This eucalypt was first formally described in 1867 by George Bentham who gave it the name Eucalyptus peltata and published the description in Flora Australiensis. In 1995 Ken Hill and Lawrie Johnson changed the name to Corymbia peltata. The specific epithet (peltata) is from the Latin word peltatus meaning peltate, referring to the attachment of the petiole to the leaf blade.

== Distribution and habitat ==
Corymbia peltata grows in tropical woodland and forest in northern Queensland, from the Newcastle Range near Georgetown to the Hervey Range near Townsville and the Burra Range near Hughenden.

== Conservation status ==
Yellowjacket is listed as of "least concern" under the Queensland Government Nature Conservation Act 1992.

== See also ==
- List of Corymbia species
