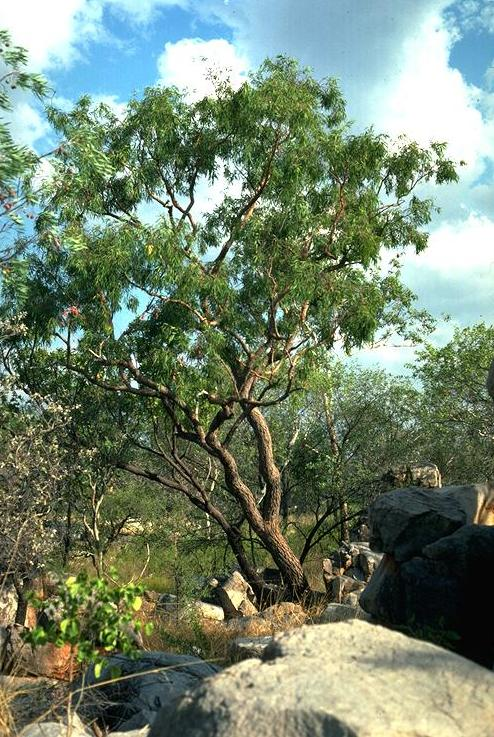

Scientific classification
- Kingdom: Plantae
- Clade: Embryophytes
- Clade: Tracheophytes
- Clade: Spermatophytes
- Clade: Angiosperms
- Clade: Eudicots
- Clade: Rosids
- Order: Myrtales
- Family: Myrtaceae
- Genus: Corymbia
- Species: C. arenaria

Binomial name
- Corymbia arenaria (Blakely) K.D.Hill & L.A.S.Johnson

Synonyms
- Eucalyptus areanaria Blakely

= Corymbia arenaria =

Bundah bundah

Species of plant

Corymbia arenaria, commonly known as bundah bundah or black bloodwood, is a species of tree that is endemic to the northern Kimberley region of Western Australia. It has rough bark on the trunk and branches, lance-shaped to curved adult leaves, flower buds in groups of seven, white flower and spherical urn-shaped fruit.

== Description ==
Corymbia arenaria is a tree that grows to a height of 4–15 m (13–49 ft) and forms a lignotuber. It has rough, fissured, tessellated, flaky or crumbly brownish bark on the trunk and branches. Young plants and coppice regrowth have broadly lance-shaped leaves 90–180 mm (3.5–7.1 in) long and 18–40 mm (0.71–1.57 in) wide. The branchlets are smooth and red and the adult leaves are arranged alternately, dull green to greyish, 60–160 mm (2.4–6.3 in) long and 8–30 mm (0.31–1.18 in) wide, tapering to a petiole 6–20 mm (0.24–0.79 in) long. The flower buds are arranged on a branched peduncle, each branch with a group of seven buds on pedicels 1–6 mm (0.039–0.236 in) long. Mature buds are pear-shaped to oval, about 4 mm (0.16 in) long and 3 mm (0.12 in) wide with a rounded to conical operculum. Flowering occurs in January or June and the flowers are white. The fruit is a woody spherical urn-shaped capsule 8–13 mm (0.31–0.51 in) long and 7–13 mm (0.28–0.51 in) wide with the valves enclosed in the fruit. The seeds are reddish brown and boat-shaped, oval or elliptical with a wing on the end.

== Taxonomy and naming ==
Bundah bundah was first formally described in 1934 by William Blakely in his book A Key to the Eucalypts from specimens collected by Charles Gardner near the King Edward River in 1921. In 1995, Ken Hill and Lawrie Johnson changed the name to Corymbia arenaria. The specific epithet (arenaria) is from the Latin word arenarius meaning "growing on sand", referring to the habitat as recorded by Gardner.

== Distribution and habitat ==
Corymbia arenaria is found along the north coast of the Kimberley region of Western Australia on plateaus, ridges and at the bases of cliffs where it grows in shallow sandy soils over sandstone.

== See also ==
- List of Corymbia species
