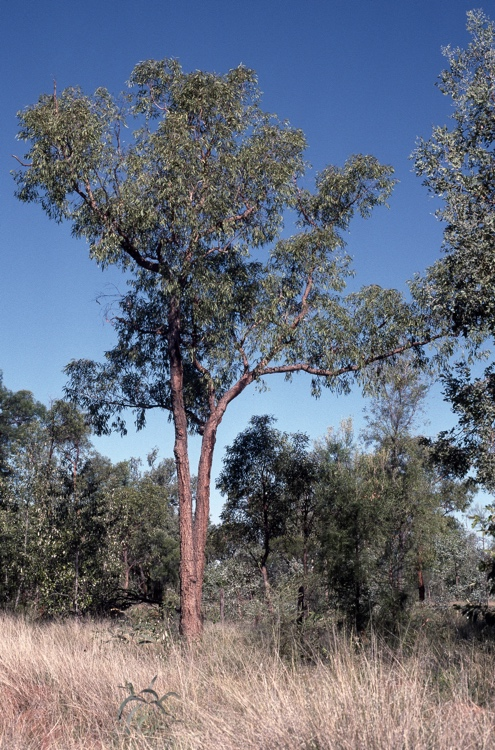

Conservation status
- Least Concern (IUCN 3.1)

Scientific classification
- Kingdom: Plantae
- Clade: Tracheophytes
- Clade: Angiosperms
- Clade: Eudicots
- Clade: Rosids
- Order: Myrtales
- Family: Myrtaceae
- Genus: Corymbia
- Species: C. brachycarpa

Binomial name
- Corymbia brachycarpa (D.J.Carr & S.G.M.Carr) K.D.Hill & L.A.S.Johnson

Synonyms
- Eucalyptus brachycarpa D.J.Carr & S.G.M.Carr

= Corymbia brachycarpa =

Species of plant

Corymbia brachycarpa is a species of tree that is endemic to central Queensland. It has rough, tessellated bark on the trunk and branches, lance-shaped adult leaves, flower buds in groups of seven, creamy white flowers and urn-shaped to barrel-shaped fruit.

== Description ==
Corymbia brachycarpa is a tree that typically grows to a height of 15 m (49 ft) and forms a lignotuber. It has rough, tessellated, brown to grey bark on the trunk and branches. Young plants and coppice regrowth have dark green leaves that are paler on the lower surface, linear to oblong or narrow lance-shaped, 70–115 mm (2.8–4.5 in) long and 4–11 mm (0.16–0.43 in) wide. Adult leaves are dark green above, paler below, lance-shaped, 80–150 mm (3.1–5.9 in) long and 9–21 mm (0.35–0.83 in) wide, tapering to a petiole 10–30 mm (0.39–1.18 in) long. The flower buds are arranged on the ends of branchlets on a branched peduncle each branch of the peduncle with seven buds on pedicels 2–12 mm (0.079–0.472 in) long. Mature buds are oval to pear-shaped, about 6 mm (0.24 in) long and 5 mm (0.20 in) wide with a rounded to conical operculum. The flowers are creamy white and the fruit is a woody urn-shaped to barrel-shaped capsule 13–18 mm (0.51–0.71 in) long and 10–15 mm (0.39–0.59 in) wide with the valves enclosed in the fruit.

== Taxonomy and naming ==
This eucalypt was first formally described in 1987 by Denis Carr and Stella Carr and was given the name Eucalyptus brachycarpa. In 1995 Ken Hill and Lawrie Johnson changed the name to Corymbia brachycarpa. The specific epithet (brachycarpa) is derived from ancient Greek words meaning "short" and "fruit".

== Distribution and habitat ==
Corymbia brachycarpa mostly grows in deep sand with an understorey of Triodia, other trees and shrubs. It is found in central Queensland including in the White Mountains and south to near Barcaldine, Alpha and Blackall.

== Conservation status ==
This eucalypt is listed as of "least concern" under the Queensland Government Nature Conservation Act 1992. The IUCN Red List assesses the species as Least Concern.

== See also ==
- List of Corymbia species
