= Corymbia papillosa =

Maningrida bloodwood

Scientific classification
- Kingdom: Plantae
- Clade: Embryophytes
- Clade: Tracheophytes
- Clade: Spermatophytes
- Clade: Angiosperms
- Clade: Eudicots
- Clade: Rosids
- Order: Myrtales
- Family: Myrtaceae
- Genus: Corymbia
- Species: C. papillosa

Binomial name
- Corymbia papillosa K.D.Hill & L.A.S.Johnson

Synonyms
- Corymbia papillosa subsp. globifera K.D.Hill & L.A.S.Johnson; Corymbia papillosa K.D.Hill & L.A.S.Johnson subsp. papillosa; Eucalyptus papillosa (K.D.Hill & L.A.S.Johnson) Brooker

Species of plant

Corymbia papillosa, commonly known as Maningrida bloodwood, is a species of small, stunted tree that is endemic to northern Australia. It has rough, tessellated bark on the trunk and branches, a crown of thin, oblong to elliptical leaves, flower buds in groups of seven, white flowers and urn-shaped to barrel-shaped fruit.

== Description ==
Corymbia papillosa is a stunted tree that typically grows to a height of 8 m (26 ft) and forms a lignotuber. It has thick, rough, tessellated flaky bark on the trunk and branches. Young plants and coppice regrowth have more or less sessile, heart-shaped to oblong leaves that are 30–100 mm (1.2–3.9 in) long and 15–50 mm (0.59–1.97 in) wide arranged in opposite pairs. The crown of the tree has juvenile leaves that are the same shade of dull light green on both sides, thin, oblong to elliptical, 40–122 mm (1.6–4.8 in) long, 20–55 mm (0.79–2.17 in) wide, arranged in opposite pairs and sessile or on a petiole up to 8 mm (0.31 in) long. The leaves are densely covered with short, multicellular, hair-like glands. The flower buds are arranged on the ends of branchlets, sometimes upper leaf axils on a peduncle 5–30 mm (0.20–1.18 in) long, each branch of the peduncle with seven buds on pedicels 1–9 mm (0.039–0.354 in) long. Mature buds are pear-shaped to oval, about 6 mm (0.24 in) long and 4–5 mm (0.16–0.20 in) wide with a conical or rounded operculum. Flowering has been observed in November and the flowers are white. The fruit is a woody urn-shaped to barrel-shaped capsule 12–17 mm (0.47–0.67 in) long and 10–16 mm (0.39–0.63 in) wide.

== Taxonomy and naming ==
Corymbia papillosa was first formally in 1995 by Ken Hill and Lawrie Johnson. The specific epithet (pachycarpa) is from the Latin papilla meaning "a nipple" and -osus, "full of", referring to the papilliform hairs on the leaves.

== Distribution and habitat ==
Maningrida bloodwood grows in flat areas in sandy soils with lateritic gravels and occurs in scattered parts of the Top End of the Northern Territory with isolated occurrence in the Kimberley region of Western Australia.

== See also ==
- List of Corymbia species
