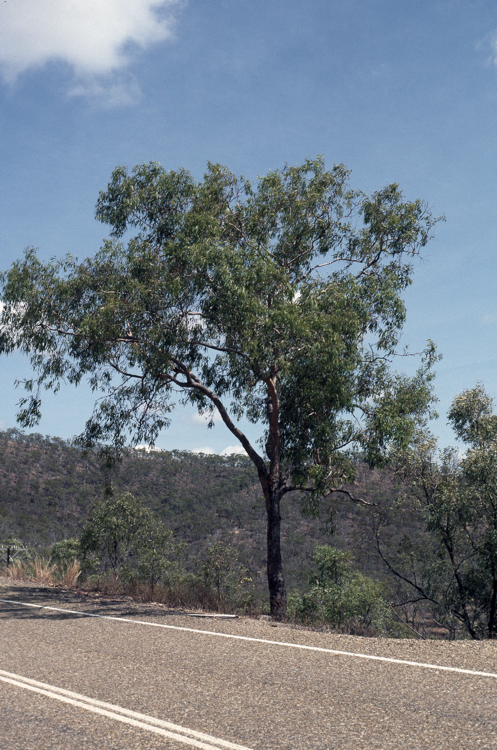

Scientific classification
- Kingdom: Plantae
- Clade: Embryophytes
- Clade: Tracheophytes
- Clade: Spermatophytes
- Clade: Angiosperms
- Clade: Eudicots
- Clade: Rosids
- Order: Myrtales
- Family: Myrtaceae
- Genus: Corymbia
- Species: C. hylandii

Binomial name
- Corymbia hylandii (D.J.Carr & S.G.M.Carr) K.D.Hill & L.A.S.Johnson

Synonyms
- List: Corymbia hylandii (D.J.Carr & S.G.M.Carr) K.D.Hill & L.A.S.Johnson subsp. hylandii; Eucalyptus hylandii D.J.Carr & S.G.M.Carr; Eucalyptus hylandii var. campestris D.J.Carr & S.G.M.Carr; Eucalyptus hylandii D.J.Carr & S.G.M.Carr var. hylandii

= Corymbia hylandii =

Species of plant

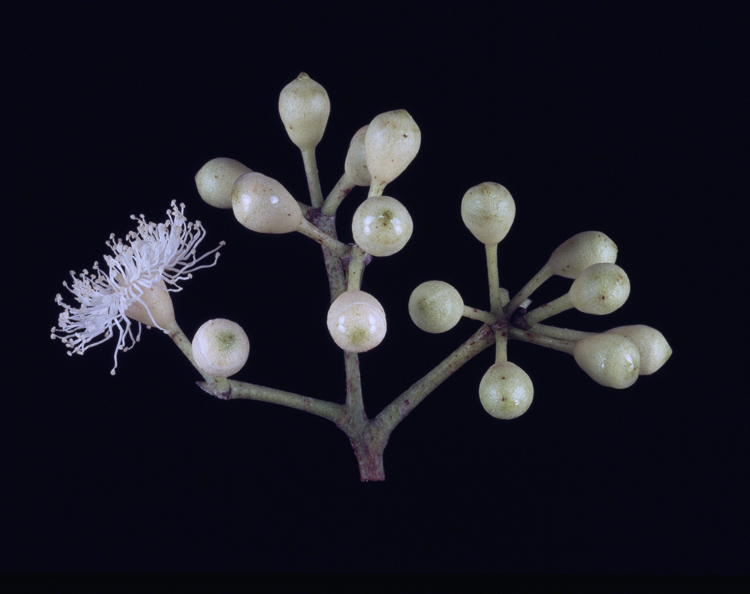
Flower buds

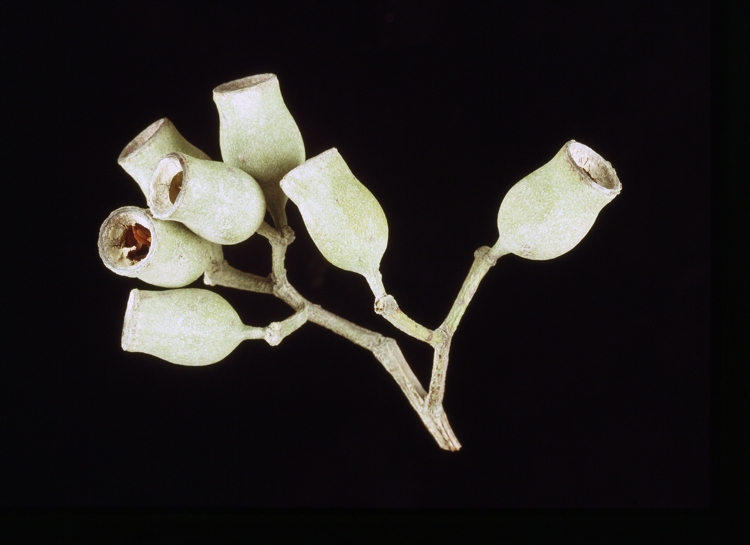
Fruit

Corymbia hylandii, commonly known as Hyland's bloodwood, is a species of small tree that is endemic to part of the Cape York Peninsula. It has rough, tessellated bark on the trunk and branches, lance-shaped adult leaves, flower buds in groups of seven, creamy white flowers and urn-shaped fruit.

== Description ==
Corymbia hylandii is a tree that typically grows to a height of 5 m (16 ft), rarely to 15 m (49 ft) and forms a lignotuber. It has rough, tessellated, grey-brown or red-brown bark on the trunk and larger branches. Young plants and coppice regrowth have elliptical to oblong leaves that are 35–80 mm (1.4–3.1 in) long, 4–15 mm (0.16–0.59 in) wide and arranged in opposite pairs. Adult leaves are arranged alternately, paler on the lower surface, lance-shaped, 84–1,950 mm (3.3–76.8 in) long and 9–25 mm (0.35–0.98 in) wide on a petiole 7–25 mm (0.28–0.98 in) long. The flower buds are arranged on the ends of branchlets on a thin, branched peduncle 4–12 mm (0.16–0.47 in) long, each branch of the peduncle with seven buds on pedicels 3–8 mm (0.12–0.31 in) long. Mature buds are pear-shaped to oval, 5–7 mm (0.20–0.28 in) long and 3–5 mm (0.12–0.20 in) wide with a rounded operculum. Flowering has been observed in April and June and the flowers are creamy white. The fruit is a woody urn-shaped capsule 10–18 mm (0.39–0.71 in) long and 8–12 mm (0.31–0.47 in) wide with a short neck and the valves enclosed in the fruit.

== Taxonomy and naming ==
Hyland's bloodwood was first formally described in 1987 by Denis Carr and Stella Carr and was given the name Eucalyptus hylandii. In 1995 Ken Hill and Lawrie Johnson changed the name to Corymbia hylandii. The specific epithet (hylandii) honours Bernie Hyland.

== Distribution and habitat ==
Corymbia hylandii grows in shallow soil on sandstone and granite ridges and is widespread on the northern and eastern Cape York Peninsula from Bathurst Bay to Laura.

== Conservation status ==
This eucalypt is classified as of "least concern" under the Queensland Government Nature Conservation Act 1992.

== See also ==
- List of Corymbia species
