= Corymbia plena =

Scientific classification
- Kingdom: Plantae
- Clade: Embryophytes
- Clade: Tracheophytes
- Clade: Spermatophytes
- Clade: Angiosperms
- Clade: Eudicots
- Clade: Rosids
- Order: Myrtales
- Family: Myrtaceae
- Genus: Corymbia
- Species: C. plena

Binomial name
- Corymbia plena K.D.Hill & L.A.S.Johnson

Synonyms
- Eucalyptus plena (K.D.Hill & L.A.S.Johnson) Brooker

Species of plant

Corymbia plena is a species of tree that is endemic to central Queensland. It has rough, chunky, tessellated bark on the trunk and branches, lance-shaped to curved adult leaves, flower buds in groups of seven, creamy white flowers and urn-shaped to barrel-shaped fruit.

== Description ==
Corymbia plena is a tree that typically grows to a height of 15 m (49 ft) and forms a lignotuber. It has thick, rough, chunky tessellated bark on the trunk and branches. Young plants and coppice regrowth have elliptical to lance-shaped leaves that are 65–105 mm (2.6–4.1 in) long, 23–30 mm (0.91–1.18 in) wide, petiolate and paler on the lower surface. Adult leaves are arranged alternately, paler on the lower surface, lance-shaped to curved, 76–155 mm (3.0–6.1 in) long and 10–25 mm (0.39–0.98 in) wide, tapering to a petiole 7–23 mm (0.28–0.91 in) long. The flower buds are arranged on the ends of branchlets on a branched peduncle 7–23 mm (0.28–0.91 in) long, each branch of the peduncle with seven buds on pedicels up to 14 mm (0.55 in) long. Mature buds are oval to pear-shaped or more or less spherical, 11–17 mm (0.43–0.67 in) long and 7–12 mm (0.28–0.47 in) wide with a conical or rounded operculum, sometimes with a central knob. Flowering occurs from April to May and the flowers are creamy white. The fruit is a woody urn-shaped to barrel-shaped capsule with the valves enclosed in the fruit.

== Taxonomy and naming ==
Corymbia plena was first formally described in 1995 by Ken Hill and Lawrie Johnson. The specific epithet (plena) is from the Latin plenus meaning "full" or "stout", referring to the relatively large fruit.

== Distribution and habitat ==
This bloodwood mostly grows in deep sandy or lateritic soil and is widespread and locally abundant between Pentland, Hughenden, Barcaldine and Tambo.

== Conservation status ==
This species is listed as of "least concern" under the Queensland Government Nature Conservation Act 1992.

== See also ==
- List of Corymbia species
