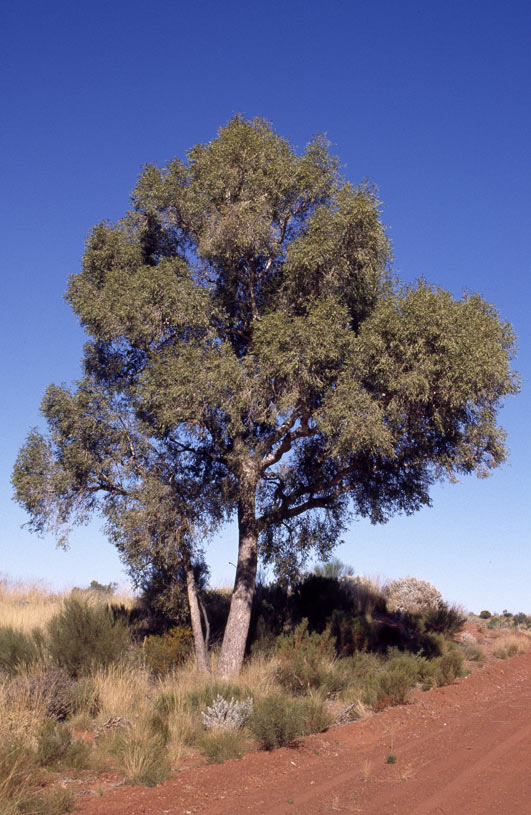
- Eucalyptus chippendalei near Warburton

Scientific classification
- Kingdom: Plantae
- Clade: Embryophytes
- Clade: Tracheophytes
- Clade: Spermatophytes
- Clade: Angiosperms
- Clade: Eudicots
- Clade: Rosids
- Order: Myrtales
- Family: Myrtaceae
- Genus: Corymbia
- Species: C. chippendalei

Binomial name
- Corymbia chippendalei (D.J.Carr & S.G.M.Carr) K.D.Hill & L.A.S.Johnson

Synonyms
- Eucalyptus chippendalei D.J.Carr & S.G.M.Carr

= Corymbia chippendalei =

Sand-dune bloodwood

Species of plant

Corymbia chippendalei, commonly known as sand-dune bloodwood or sandhill bloodwood, is a species of small tree or a mallee that is endemic to desert country in central Australia. It has rough bark on part or all of the trunk, lance-shaped adult leaves, flower buds in groups of seven, white flowers and shortened spherical fruit.

== Description ==
Eucalyptus chippendalei is a tree that typically grows to a height of 10 m (33 ft), sometimes a smaller mallee, and forms a lignotuber. It has rough, flaky or tessellated bark on part or all of the trunk, smooth cream-coloured or white bark above. Young plants and coppice regrowth have lance-shaped to narrow lance-shaped leaves that are 50–110 mm (2.0–4.3 in) long, 10–20 mm (0.39–0.79 in) wide and more or less sessile. Adult leaves are the same shade of glossy green on both sides, 80–130 mm (3.1–5.1 in) long and 10–23 mm (0.39–0.91 in) wide tapering to a petiole 10–20 mm (0.39–0.79 in) long. The flower buds are arranged on the ends of branchlets on a branched peduncle 5–20 mm (0.20–0.79 in) long, each branch of the peduncle with seven buds on pedicels 1–7 mm (0.039–0.276 in) long. Mature buds are oval to pear-shaped, 7–9 mm (0.28–0.35 in) long and 5–7 mm (0.20–0.28 in) wide with a rounded to conical operculum. Flowering occurs from January to March and the flowers are white. The fruit is a woody, shortened spherical capsule 16–28 mm (0.63–1.10 in) long and 15–250 mm (0.59–9.84 in) wide with the valves enclosed in the fruit.

== Taxonomy and naming ==
The sand-dune bloodwood was first formally described in 1985 by Denis Carr and Stella Carr and was given the name Eucalyptus chippendalei. In 1995 Ken Hill and Lawrie Johnson changed the name to Corymbia chippendalei. The specific epithet (chippendalei) honours George Chippendale.

== Distribution and habitat ==
Corymbia chippendalei usually grows on the crest of sand dunes in the Great Sandy Desert and central ranges of far eastern Western Australia, and in the south-west of the Northern Territory.

== See also ==
- List of Corymbia species
