= Corymbia lenziana =

Narrow-leaved bloodwood

Scientific classification
- Kingdom: Plantae
- Clade: Embryophytes
- Clade: Tracheophytes
- Clade: Spermatophytes
- Clade: Angiosperms
- Clade: Eudicots
- Clade: Rosids
- Order: Myrtales
- Family: Myrtaceae
- Genus: Corymbia
- Species: C. lenziana

Binomial name
- Corymbia lenziana (D.J.Carr & S.G.M.Carr) K.D.Hill & L.A.S.Johnson

Synonyms
- Eucalyptus lenziana D.J.Carr & S.G.M.Carr; Eucalyptus symonii D.J.Carr & S.G.M.Carr

Species of plant

Corymbia lenziana, commonly known as narrow-leaved bloodwood, is a species of small tree that is endemic to Western Australia. It has rough, tessellated bark on the trunk and branches, narrow lance-shaped to linear leaves, flower buds in groups of seven, white flowers and shortened spherical fruit.

== Description ==
Corymbia lenziana is a straggly, sometimes mallee-like tree that typically grows to a height of 10 m (33 ft) and forms a lignotuber. It has rough, tessellated, brownish bark on the trunk and branches. Young plants and coppice regrowth have narrow lance-shaped to linear leaves that are 40–100 mm (1.6–3.9 in) long, 3–8 mm (0.12–0.31 in) wide and petiolate. Adult leaves are the same shade of dull green on both sides, 65–120 mm (2.6–4.7 in) long and 5–15 mm (0.20–0.59 in) wide, tapering to a petiole 4–15 mm (0.16–0.59 in) long. The flower buds are arranged on the ends of branchlets on a branched peduncle 5–13 mm (0.20–0.51 in) long, each branch of the peduncle with seven buds on pedicels 2–7 mm (0.079–0.276 in) long. Mature buds are oval to pear-shaped, 6–8 mm (0.24–0.31 in) long and 4–8 mm (0.16–0.31 in) wide with a rounded or limpet-shaped operculum. Flowering has been observed in March and the flowers are white. The fruit is a woody, shortened spherical capsule 12–19 mm (0.47–0.75 in) long and 10–17 mm (0.39–0.67 in) wide with the valves deeply enclosed in the fruit.

This species is similar to C. eremaea and is distinguished from it mainly on the basis of its habit (a straggly, small tree) and habitat (not in rocky places nor on the crest of sand dunes).

== Taxonomy and naming ==
Narrow-leaved bloodwood first formally described in 1985 by Denis Carr and Stella Carr and was given the name Eucalyptus lenziana. In 1995 Ken Hill and Lawrie Johnson changed the name to Corymbia lenziana. The specific epithet (lenziana) honours Janette Rosemary Lenz (born 1948).

== Distribution and habitat ==
Corymbia lenziana grows in mulga on sandplain and on low rises in desert or semi-desert sand dunes from inland of Shark Bay to east of Wiluna in the Carnarvon, Central Ranges, Gascoyne and Murchison biogeographic regions of Western Australia.

== Conservation status ==
This eucalypt is classified as "not threatened" by the Western Australian Government Department of Parks and Wildlife.

== See also ==
- List of Corymbia species
