= Corymbia lamprophylla =

Shiny-leaved bloodwood

Scientific classification
- Kingdom: Plantae
- Clade: Embryophytes
- Clade: Tracheophytes
- Clade: Spermatophytes
- Clade: Angiosperms
- Clade: Eudicots
- Clade: Rosids
- Order: Myrtales
- Family: Myrtaceae
- Genus: Corymbia
- Species: C. lamprophylla

Binomial name
- Corymbia lamprophylla (Brooker & A.R.Bean) K.D.Hill & L.A.S.Johnson

Synonyms
- Eucalyptus lamprophylla Brooker & A.R.Bean

Species of plant

Corymbia lamprophylla, commonly known as shiny-leaved bloodwood, is a species of tree that is endemic to central Queensland. It has rough, tessellated bark on the trunk and larger branches, lance-shaped adult leaves, flower buds in groups of seven, creamy white flowers and urn-shaped fruit.

== Description ==
Corymbia lamprophylla is a tree that typically grows to a height of 15 m (49 ft) and forms a lignotuber. It has rough, brownish, deeply tessellated bark on the trunk and larger branches, smooth grey or cream-coloured bark on branches thinner than about 30 mm (1.2 in). Young plants and coppice regrowth have glossy green leaves that are paler on the lower surface, lance-shaped, 65–135 mm (2.6–5.3 in) long and 10–20 mm (0.39–0.79 in) wide on a short petiole. Adult leaves are very glossy on the upper surface, paler below, lance-shaped, 70–180 mm (2.8–7.1 in) long and 10–30 mm (0.39–1.18 in) wide, tapering to a petiole 10–30 mm (0.39–1.18 in) long. The flower buds are arranged on the ends of branchlets on a branched peduncle 8–17 mm (0.31–0.67 in) long, each branch of the peduncle with seven buds on pedicels up to 3 mm (0.12 in) long. Mature buds are pear-shaped to oval, 6–9 mm (0.24–0.35 in) long and 4–6 mm (0.16–0.24 in) wide with a rounded operculum that sometimes has a knob in the middle. Flowering occurs from January to April, and the flowers are creamy white. The fruit is a woody urn-shaped capsule 11–18 mm (0.43–0.71 in) long and 10–14 mm (0.39–0.55 in) wide with the valves enclosed in the fruit.

== Taxonomy and naming ==
The shiny-leaved bloodwood was first formally described in 1987 by Ian Brooker and Anthony Bean in the journal Brunonia, and was given the name Eucalyptus lamprophylla from specimens they collected in the "Torrens River" catchment in the White Mountains in 1985. In 1995, Ken Hill and Lawrie Johnson changed the name to Corymbia lamprophylla.

== Distribution and habitat ==
Corymbia lamprophylla grows in shallow, sandy soil on elevated sandstone or granite mainly from near Paluma to the White Mountains in central eastern Queensland.

== Conservation status ==
This eucalypt is classified as of "least concern" under the Queensland Government Nature Conservation Act 1992.

== See also ==
- List of Corymbia species
