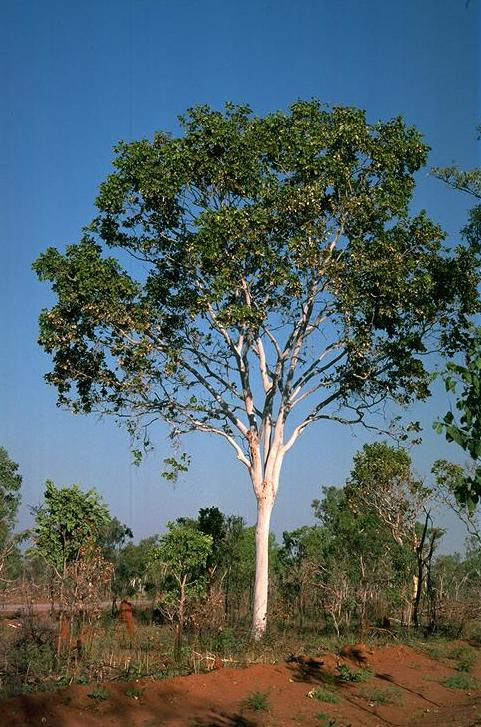
- Corymbia grandifolia near Katherine

Scientific classification
- Kingdom: Plantae
- Clade: Embryophytes
- Clade: Tracheophytes
- Clade: Spermatophytes
- Clade: Angiosperms
- Clade: Eudicots
- Clade: Rosids
- Order: Myrtales
- Family: Myrtaceae
- Genus: Corymbia
- Species: C. grandifolia

Binomial name
- Corymbia grandifolia (R.Br. ex Benth.) K.D.Hill & L.A.S.Johnson

Synonyms
- Eucalyptus grandifolia R.Br. ex Benth.

= Corymbia grandifolia =

Cabbage gum

Species of plant

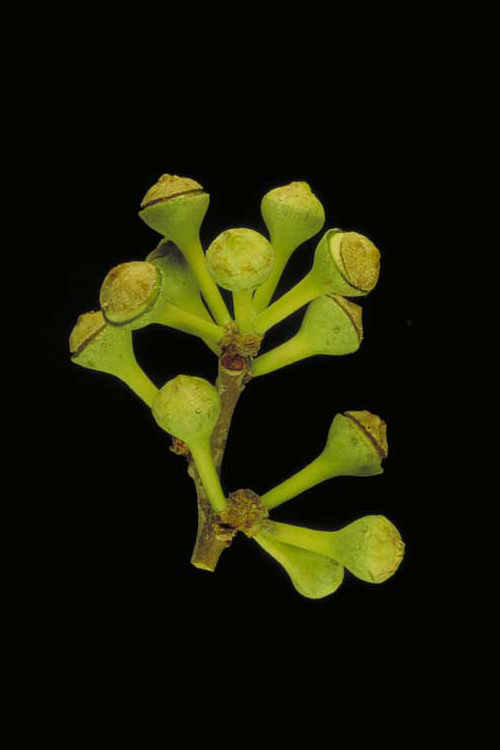
flower buds

Corymbia grandifolia, commonly known as cabbage gum, large-leaved cabbage gum and paper-fruited bloodwood, is a species of tree that is endemic to northern Australia. It has smooth bark, egg-shaped to broadly elliptic to lance-shaped adult leaves, flowers buds in groups of three or seven, creamy white flowers and cup-shaped to cylindrical fruit.

== Description ==
Corymbia grandifolia is a tree that typically grows to a height of 3–15 m (9.8–49.2 ft) and forms a lignotuber. It has smooth white to pale grey bark that is shed in thin flakes. Young plants and coppice regrowth have egg-shaped to broadly lance-shaped leaves that are 130–170 mm (5.1–6.7 in) long, 110–140 mm (4.3–5.5 in) wide and petiolate. Adult leaves are the same shade of glossy green on both sides, egg-shaped to broadly elliptic to lance-shaped, 80–200 mm (3.1–7.9 in) long and 30–85 mm (1.2–3.3 in) wide on a petiole 5–16 mm (0.20–0.63 in) long. The tree loses its leaves in the dry season. The flower buds are arranged in leaf axils on the leafless branchlets, on a branched peduncle up to 2 mm (0.079 in) long, each branch of the peduncle with three or seven buds on pedicels 8–27 mm (0.31–1.06 in) long. Mature buds are pear-shaped, 10–12 mm (0.39–0.47 in) long and 7–9 mm (0.28–0.35 in) wide with a rounded operculum that sometimes has a central point or knob. Flowering occurs from September to January and the flowers are creamy white. The fruit is a cup-shaped to cylindrical capsule 10–17 mm (0.39–0.67 in) long, 8–14 mm (0.31–0.55 in) wide on pedicels 7–26 mm (0.28–1.02 in) long and with the valves enclosed in the fruit.

== Taxonomy and naming ==
Cabbage gum was first formally described in 1867 by George Bentham from an unpublished description by Robert Brown and was given the name Eucalyptus grandifolia. Bentham's description was published in Flora Australiensis. In 1995 Ken Hill and Lawrie Johnson changed the name to Corymbia grandifolia.

In the same paper, Hill and Johnson described three subspecies and the names have been accepted by the Australian Plant Census:

- Corymbia grandifolia (R.Br. ex Benth.) K.D.Hill & L.A.S.Johnson subsp. grandifolia;
- Corymbia grandifolia subsp. lamprocardia L.A.S.Johnson;
- Corymbia grandifolia subsp. longa L.A.S.Johnson.

== Distribution and habitat ==
Corymbia grandifolia grows in open forest, in woodland near watercourses and swamps and rocky slopes or flats in skeletal sandy soils over sandstone or basalt. Its range extends from the Kimberley region of Western Australia, across the top end of the Northern Territory including Bathurst and Melville Islands, and along the coast of the Gulf of Carpentaria as far east as the Gilbert River in Queensland.

== See also ==
- List of Corymbia species
