= Corymbia ellipsoidea =

Scientific classification
- Kingdom: Plantae
- Clade: Embryophytes
- Clade: Tracheophytes
- Clade: Spermatophytes
- Clade: Angiosperms
- Clade: Eudicots
- Clade: Rosids
- Order: Myrtales
- Family: Myrtaceae
- Genus: Corymbia
- Species: C. ellipsoidea

Binomial name
- Corymbia ellipsoidea (D.J.Carr & S.G.M.Carr) K.D.Hill & L.A.S.Johnson

Synonyms
- Corymbia porphyritica K.D.Hill & L.A.S.Johnson; Eucalyptus ellipsoidea D.J.Carr & S.G.M.Carr

Species of plant

Corymbia ellipsoidea is a species of tree that is endemic to Queensland. It has rough bark on the trunk and larger branches, lance-shaped adult leaves, flower buds usually in groups of seven, creamy white flowers and barrel-shaped to urn-shaped fruit.

== Description ==
Corymbia ellipsoidea is a tree that typically grows to a height of 12 metres (39 ft) and forms a lignotuber. It has red-brown over dull, white to cream or grey tessellated bark that is persistent on the trunk, reddish, scaly or flaky bark that is shed in small polygonal flakes on the larger branches, and smooth grey, pink or cream-coloured bark on the thinnest branches. Adult leaves are the same dull, grey-green colour on both sides, linear to narrow lance-shaped, lance-shaped or curved, 90–175 mm (3.5–6.9 in) long and 7–23 mm (0.28–0.91 in) wide, tapering to a narrow, flattened petiole 11–28 mm (0.43–1.10 in) long. The flowers are borne on the ends of the branchlets on a thin, branched peduncle 8–21 mm (0.31–0.83 in) long, each branch of the peduncle with three or seven buds on thin pedicels 5–11 mm (0.20–0.43 in) long. Mature buds are oval or pear-shaped, 7–8 mm (0.28–0.31 in) long and 4–5 mm (0.16–0.20 in) wide with a rounded or flattened operculum. Flowering has been observed in January and February and the flowers are white or cream-coloured. The fruit is a woody barrel-shaped to urn-shaped capsule 12–19 mm (0.47–0.75 in) long and 9–14 mm (0.35–0.55 in) wide with a distinct, often flared neck and the valves enclosed in the fruit.

== Taxonomy and naming ==
This eucalypt was first formally described in 1987 by Denis Carr and Stella Carr and was given the name Eucalyptus ellipsoidea. In 1995 Ken Hill and Lawrie Johnson changed the name to Corymbia ellipsoidea.

== Distribution and habitat ==
Corymbia ellipsoidea is locally abundant in scattered locations, growing in woodland on sandy soil on granite ridges from the Atherton Tableland, south west to the Newcastle Range near Forsayth and south to near Charters Towers

== Conservation status ==
This eucalypt is classified as of "least concern" under the Queensland Government Nature Conservation Act 1992.

== See also ==
- List of Corymbia species
