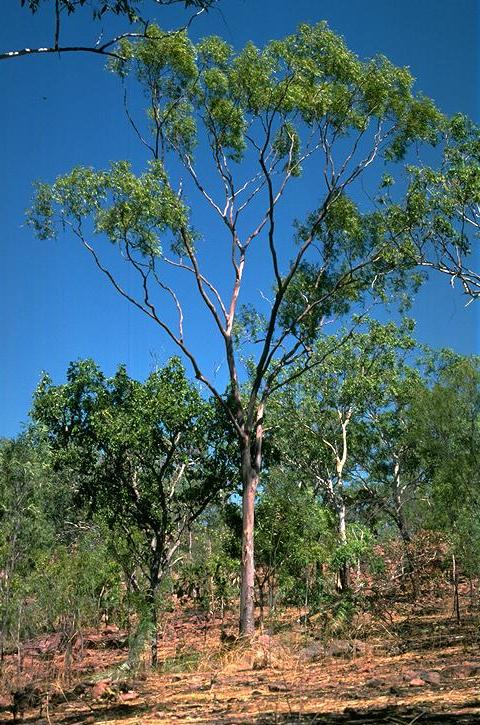

Scientific classification
- Kingdom: Plantae
- Clade: Embryophytes
- Clade: Tracheophytes
- Clade: Spermatophytes
- Clade: Angiosperms
- Clade: Eudicots
- Clade: Rosids
- Order: Myrtales
- Family: Myrtaceae
- Genus: Corymbia
- Species: C. kombolgiensis

Binomial name
- Corymbia kombolgiensis (Brooker & Dunlop) K.D.Hill & L.A.S.Johnson

Synonyms
- Eucalyptus kombolgiensis Brooker & Dunlop

= Corymbia kombolgiensis =

Scarp gum

Species of plant

Corymbia kombolgiensis, commonly known as scarp gum or paper-fruited bloodwood, is a species of small tree that is endemic to the Northern Territory. It has smooth bark, sometimes with rough, tessellated bark near the base, linear to narrow lance-shaped adult leaves, flower buds usually in groups of seven, white flowers and cylindrical to barrel-shaped fruit.

== Description ==
Corymbia kombolgiensis is a tree that typically grows to a height of 12 m (39 ft) and forms a lignotuber. It has smooth creamy white to brownish bark, sometimes with rough, grey, tessellated bark on the lower part of the trunk. Young plants and coppice regrowth have egg-shaped to elliptical leaves that are 45–90 mm (1.8–3.5 in) long and 20–60 mm (0.79–2.36 in) wide on a short petiole. Adult leaves are the same shade of slightly glossy green on both sides, linear to narrow lance-shaped, 80–210 mm (3.1–8.3 in) long and 6–10 mm (0.24–0.39 in) wide, tapering to a petiole 4–16 mm (0.16–0.63 in) long. The flower buds are usually arranged in leaf axils on a branched peduncle up to 10 mm (0.39 in) long, each branch of the peduncle with usually with seven, sometimes up to thirteen buds on pedicels 5–15 mm (0.20–0.59 in) long. Mature buds are smooth and glossy, oval to pear-shaped, 4–6 mm (0.16–0.24 in) long and 3–5 mm (0.12–0.20 in) wide with a rounded operculum. Flowering has been observed in August, October and November and the flowers are white. The fruit is a woody, cylindrical to barrel-shaped capsule 8–10 mm (0.31–0.39 in) long and 4–8 mm (0.16–0.31 in) wide and thin-walled, with the valves enclosed in the fruit.

== Taxonomy and naming ==
Scarp gum was first formally described in 1978 by Ian Brooker and Clyde Dunlop in the journal Australian Forest Research, and was given the name Eucalyptus kombolgiensis. The type specimens were collected by Dunlop on Mount Brockman (in Kakadu National Park) in 1977. In 1995, Ken Hill and Lawrie Johnson changed the name of this species to Corymbia kombolgiensis. The specific epithet (kombolgiensis) is a reference to the Kombolgie sandstone, where this species is common.

== Distribution and habitat ==
Corymbia kombolgiensis grows in open forest on sandstone escarpments and plateaus from PineCreek to the Arnhem Land plateau.

== See also ==
- List of Corymbia species
