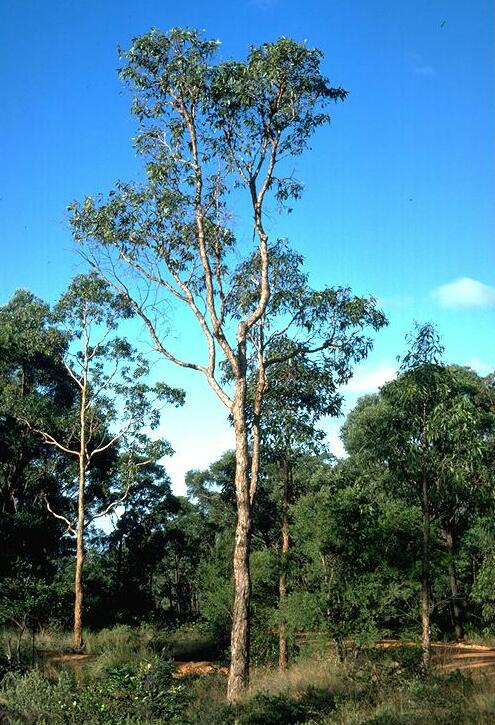
- Corymbia bunites in Blackdown

Scientific classification
- Kingdom: Plantae
- Clade: Embryophytes
- Clade: Tracheophytes
- Clade: Spermatophytes
- Clade: Angiosperms
- Clade: Eudicots
- Clade: Rosids
- Order: Myrtales
- Family: Myrtaceae
- Genus: Corymbia
- Species: C. bunites

Binomial name
- Corymbia bunites (Ian Brooker & A.R.Bean) K.D.Hill & L.A.S.Johnson

Synonyms
- Eucalyptus bunites Brooker & A.R.Bean

= Corymbia bunites =

Blackdown yellowjacket

Species of plant

Corymbia bunites, commonly known as Blackdown yellowjacket, is a species of tall tree that is endemic to Queensland. It has rough bark on the trunk and branches, lance-shaped or curved adult leaves, flower buds in groups of seven, white flowers and barrel-shaped, urn-shaped or spherical fruit.

== Description ==
Corymbia bunites is a tree that typically grows to a height of 25 m (82 ft) and forms a lignotuber. It has soft, rough, flaky yellowish or brownish bark on the trunk and branches. Young plants and coppice regrowth have egg-shaped to lance-shaped leaves that are 80–165 mm (3.1–6.5 in) long and 20–35 mm (0.79–1.38 in) wide. Adult leaves are the same shade of green on both sides, lance-shaped or curved, 70–200 mm (2.8–7.9 in) long and 12–35 mm (0.47–1.38 in) wide, tapering to a petiole 10–26 mm (0.39–1.02 in) long. The flower buds are arranged on the ends of branchlets on a branched peduncle 5–25 mm (0.20–0.98 in) long, each branch of the peduncle with seven buds that are sessile or on pedicels up to 4 mm (0.16 in) long. Mature buds are oval, about 7 mm (0.28 in) long and 5 mm (0.20 in) wide with a variably shaped operculum. The flowers are white and the fruit is a woody barrel-shaped, urn-shaped or spherical capsule 8–12 mm (0.31–0.47 in) long and 7–11 mm (0.28–0.43 in) wide with the valves enclosed in the fruit.

== Taxonomy and naming ==
The Blackdown yellowjacket was first formally described in 1991 by Ian Brooker and Anthony Bean in the journal Austrobaileya and given the name Eucalyptus bunites from specimens collected by Brooker on the Blackdown Tableland in 1972. In 1995, Ken Hill and Lawrie Johnson changed the name to Corymbia bunites. The specific epithet (bunites) is from an ancient Greek word meaning "hill dweller", referring to the habitat of this species.

== Distribution and habitat ==
Corymbia bunites grows in shallow, sandy soil on sandstone hills and ridges. It has a disjunct distribution, mainly on the Blackdown Tableland but also on the Expedition Dawson, Bedourie and Shotover Ranges.

== Conservation status ==
This eucalypt is classified as of "least concern" under the Queensland Government Nature Conservation Act 1992.

== See also ==
- List of Corymbia species
