= Corymbia disjuncta =

Conservation status
- Least Concern (IUCN 3.1)

Scientific classification
- Kingdom: Plantae
- Clade: Tracheophytes
- Clade: Angiosperms
- Clade: Eudicots
- Clade: Rosids
- Order: Myrtales
- Family: Myrtaceae
- Genus: Corymbia
- Species: C. disjuncta

Binomial name
- Corymbia disjuncta K.D.Hill & L.A.S.Johnson

Synonyms
- Blakella disjuncta (K.D.Hill & L.A.S.Johnson) Crisp & L.G.Cook; Corymbia karelgica K.D.Hill & L.A.S.Johnson; Eucalyptus disjuncta (K.D.Hill & L.A.S.Johnson) D.Nicolle

Species of plant

Corymbia disjuncta is a species of tree that is endemic in northern Australia. It has rough bark on some or all of the trunk, then a clear separation to smooth bark, a crown of intermediate and adult, heart-shaped to egg-shaped leaves, flower buds mostly in groups of seven, creamy white flowers and cylindrical to barrel-shaped or urn-shaped fruit.

== Description ==
Corymbia disjuncta is a tree that typically grows to a height of 15 m (49 ft) and forms a lignotuber. It has rough, tessellated greyish bark on part or all of the trunk, abruptly separated from the smooth white to pale grey bark above. Young plants and coppice regrowth have heart-shaped leaves that are 150–350 mm (5.9–13.8 in) long and 100–230 mm (3.9–9.1 in) wide arranged in opposite pairs. The crown is composed of intermediate to adult leaves that are mostly arranged in opposite pairs, the same shade of dull green on both sides, heart-shaped to egg-shaped or round, 90–180 mm (3.5–7.1 in) long and 50–125 mm (2.0–4.9 in) wide on a petiole 10–33 mm (0.39–1.30 in) long. The tree loses its leaves in the dry season and the flowers develop on bare branches, just below the new season's growth. The flower buds are arranged in leaf axils on a branched peduncle up to 16 mm (0.63 in) long, each branch of the peduncle usually with seven buds, the individual buds on pedicels 15–35 mm (0.59–1.38 in) long. Mature buds are pear-shaped, 5–8 mm (0.20–0.31 in) long and 4–6 mm (0.16–0.24 in) wide with a rounded operculum. Flowering occurs from August to November and the flowers are creamy white. The fruit is a woody cylindrical, barrel-shaped or urn-shaped capsule 9–17 mm (0.35–0.67 in) long and 7–14 mm (0.28–0.55 in) wide with the valves enclosed in the fruit.

== Taxonomy and naming ==
Corymbia disjuncta was first formally described in 1995 by Ken Hill and Lawrie Johnson from specimens collected by John D. Briggs on the road to Stapleton in the Northern Territory in 1983.

== Distribution and habitat ==
This eucalypt has a disjunct distribution from the northern Kimberley region of Western Australia to northern lowland areas and off-shore islands of the Northern Territory, and the northern Cape York Peninsula of Queensland. It is also found in southern parts of Papua New Guinea. It grows in shallow soils over basalt and sandstone.

== See also ==
- List of Corymbia species
