= Corymbia stockeri =

Blotchy bloodwood

Scientific classification
- Kingdom: Plantae
- Clade: Tracheophytes
- Clade: Angiosperms
- Clade: Eudicots
- Clade: Rosids
- Order: Myrtales
- Family: Myrtaceae
- Genus: Corymbia
- Species: C. stockeri

Binomial name
- Corymbia stockeri (D.J.Carr & S.G.M.Carr) K.D.Hill & L.A.S.Johnson

Synonyms
- Eucalyptus stockeri D.J.Carr & S.G.M.Carr

Species of plant

Corymbia stockeri, commonly known as blotchy bloodwood, is a species of small tree that is endemic to Cape York Peninsula in Queensland. It has rough, tessellated bark on the trunk and branches, lance-shaped adult leaves, flower buds in groups of seven, creamy white flowers and barrel-shaped to urn-shaped fruit.

== Description ==
Corymbia stockeri is a tree that typically grows to a height of 12–20 m (39–66 ft) and forms a lignotuber. It has thick, soft, scaly to flaky, reddish bark on the trunk and branches. Young plants and coppice regrowth have elliptic to oblong, later lance-shaped leaves that are glossy green on the upper surface, paler below, 60–120 mm (2.4–4.7 in) long and 9–28 mm (0.35–1.10 in) wide. Adult leaves are glossy green on the upper surface, paler below, lance-shaped, 80–215 mm (3.1–8.5 in) long and 9–25 mm (0.35–0.98 in) wide on a petiole 8–25 mm (0.31–0.98 in) long. The flower buds are arranged on the ends of branchlets on a branched peduncle 4–14 mm (0.16–0.55 in) long, each branch of the peduncle with seven buds on pedicels 4–13 mm (0.16–0.51 in) long. Mature buds are pear-shaped to oval, 6–8 mm (0.24–0.31 in) long and 4–6 mm (0.16–0.24 in) wide with a rounded operculum. Flowering has been observed in February and the flowers are creamy white. The fruit is a woody barrel-shaped to urn-shaped capsule 10–17 mm (0.39–0.67 in) long and 8–14 mm (0.31–0.55 in) wide with the valves enclosed in the fruit.

== Taxonomy and naming ==
The blotchy bloodwood was first formally described in 1987 by Denis John Carr and Stella Grace Maisie Carr who gave it the name Eucalyptus stockeri and published the description in their book Eucalyptus II - The rubber cuticle, and other studies of the Corymbosae. The type specimens were collected by Geoffrey Stocker near Mutchilba in 1973. In 1995, Ken Hill and Lawrie Johnson changed the name to Corymbia stockeri, publishing the change in the journal Telopea. The specific epithet (stockeri) honours the collector of the type specimens.

In 2002, Anthony Bean described two subspecies in the journal Austrobaileya and the names have been accepted by the Australian Plant Census:

- Corymbia stockeri subsp. peninsularis (K.D.Hill & L.A.S.Johnson) A.R.Bean (previously known as Corymbia hylandii subsp. peninsularis) is a smaller tree with non-scurfy buds and later dull adult leaves than those of the autonym;
- Corymbia stockeri (D.J.Carr & S.G.M.Carr) K.D.Hill & L.A.S.Johnson subsp. stockeri.

== Distribution and habitat ==
Subspecies stockeri grows in woodland on stony ridges with little soil and is only known from the Stannary Hills west of Atherton. Subspecies peninsularis is more widespread than the autonym and grows in forest and woodland on river levees and gently-sloping hills, and is found from some of the Torres Strait Islands south to the Palmer River on Cape York.

== Conservation status ==
This eucalypt is classified as of "least concern" under the Queensland Government Nature Conservation Act 1992.

== See also ==
- List of Corymbia species
