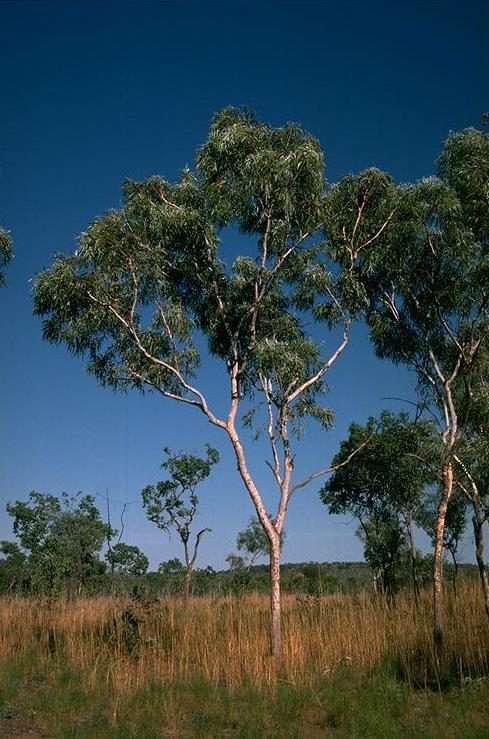
- Corymbia collina near Mount House

Scientific classification
- Kingdom: Plantae
- Clade: Embryophytes
- Clade: Tracheophytes
- Clade: Spermatophytes
- Clade: Angiosperms
- Clade: Eudicots
- Clade: Rosids
- Order: Myrtales
- Family: Myrtaceae
- Genus: Corymbia
- Species: C. collina

Binomial name
- Corymbia collina (W.Fitzg.) K.D.Hill & L.A.S.Johnson

= Corymbia collina =

Silver-leaved bloodwood

Species of plant

Corymbia collina, commonly known as silver-leaved bloodwood, is a species of tree that is endemic to Western Australia. It has thin patchy rough bark on some or all of the trunk, smooth white to pale grey bark above, lance-shaped to curved adult leaves, flower buds in groups of seven, creamy white flowers and barrel-shaped fruit.

== Description ==
Corymbia collina typically grows to a height of 7–18 m (23–59 ft) and forms a lignotuber. It has rough, patchy, fibrous to flaky, tessellated bark on part or all of the trunk, smooth white or cream-coloured to pale grey bark above. Young plants and coppice regrowth have heart-shaped to egg-shaped leaves 55–130 mm (2.2–5.1 in) long and 40–70 mm (1.6–2.8 in) wide. Adult leaves are glossy green, lance-shaped to curved, 92–235 mm (3.6–9.3 in) long and 10–30 mm (0.39–1.18 in) wide, tapering to a petiole 10–37 mm (0.39–1.46 in) long. The flower buds are arranged on the ends of branchlets on a branched peduncle 5–35 mm (0.20–1.38 in) long, each branch of the peduncle with seven buds on pedicels 5–28 mm (0.20–1.10 in) long. Mature buds are oval, 13–16 mm (0.51–0.63 in) long and 10–11 mm (0.39–0.43 in) wide with a rounded to bluntly conical operculum. Flowering occurs from April to June and the flowers are creamy white. The fruit is a woody, barrel-shaped capsule 26–37 mm (1.0–1.5 in) long and 18–25 mm (0.71–0.98 in) wide with the valves enclosed in the fruit.

== Taxonomy and naming ==
The name Eucalyptus collina first appeared in the Western Mail newspaper on 2 June 1906 in an article written by William Vincent Fitzgerald. The first formal description of the species was published in 1923 by Joseph Maiden in his book, A Critical Revision of the genus Eucalyptus, from an unpublished description by Fitzgerald. In 1995, Ken Hill and Lawrie Johnson changed the name to Corymbia collina.

== Distribution and habitat ==
The silver-leaved bloodwood grows on rocky ranges, tablelands and slopes in the Wunaamin Miliwundi Ranges and Bungle Bungle Range areas in the Kimberley region of Western Australia.

== See also ==
- List of Corymbia species
