= Corymbia chartacea =

Scientific classification
- Kingdom: Plantae
- Clade: Tracheophytes
- Clade: Angiosperms
- Clade: Eudicots
- Clade: Rosids
- Order: Myrtales
- Family: Myrtaceae
- Genus: Corymbia
- Species: C. chartacea

Binomial name
- Corymbia chartacea (A.R.Bean) K.D.Hill & L.A.S.Johnson

Synonyms
- Eucalyptus chartacea (K.D.Hill & L.A.S. Johnson) Brooker

Species of plant

Corymbia chartacea is a species of small tree with a weeping habit that is endemic to the Top End of the Northern Territory. It has thick, rough bark on the trunk and branches, a crown of sessile, broadly heart-shaped to broadly elliptical leaves arranged in opposite pairs, flower buds in groups of three or seven, pink or white flowers and urn-shaped to shortened spherical fruit.

== Description ==
Corymbia chartacea is a tree that typically grows to a height of 8 m (26 ft), forms a lignotuber and often has long, drooping branches. Young plants and coppice regrowth have sessile, heart-shaped to egg-shaped leaves that are up to 120 mm (4.7 in) long, 70 mm (2.8 in) wide and arranged in opposite pairs. The crown of the tree is composed of juvenile leaves that are sessile, broadly heart-shaped to broadly elliptical, 60–160 mm (2.4–6.3 in) long, 30–86 mm (1.2–3.4 in) wide and arranged in opposite pairs. The flower buds are arranged on the ends of branchlets on a branched peduncle 5–20 mm (0.20–0.79 in) long, each branch of the peduncle with groups of three or seven buds on pedicels up to 12 mm (0.47 in) long. Mature buds are pear-shaped, 10–16 mm (0.39–0.63 in) long and 8–11 mm (0.31–0.43 in) wide with a beaked operculum. Flowering has been observed in February, May and August and the flowers are pink or white. The fruit is a woody urn-shaped to shortened spherical capsule 21–30 mm (0.83–1.18 in) long and wide with the valves enclosed in the fruit.

== Taxonomy and naming ==
Corymbia chartacea was first formally described in 1995 by Kenneth Hill and Lawrence Alexander Sidney Johnson in the journal Telopea. The specific epithet (chartacea) is from the Latin word chartaceus meaning "papery", referring to the texture of the leaves.

== Distribution and habitat ==
This eucalypt grows as an understorey species in forest and woodland and is restricted to north-western Arnhem Land and the adjacent escarpment country.

== See also ==
- List of Corymbia species
