= Corymbia polysciada =

Apple gum

Scientific classification
- Kingdom: Plantae
- Clade: Embryophytes
- Clade: Tracheophytes
- Clade: Spermatophytes
- Clade: Angiosperms
- Clade: Eudicots
- Clade: Rosids
- Order: Myrtales
- Family: Myrtaceae
- Genus: Corymbia
- Species: C. polysciada

Binomial name
- Corymbia polysciada (F.Muell.) K.D.Hill & L.A.S.Johnson

Synonyms
- Eucalyptus polysciada F.Muell.

Species of plant

Corymbia polysciada, commonly known as apple gum, paper-fruited bloodwood or bolomin, is a species of tree that is endemic to the Top End of the Northern Territory. It has rough, tessellated bark on some or all or the trunk, smooth bark above, egg-shaped to broadly lance-shaped adult leaves, flower buds in groups of seven, creamy white flowers and cup-shaped, cylindrical or barrel-shaped from on long pedicels.

== Description ==
Corymbia polysciada is a tree that typically grows to a height of 15 m (49 ft) and forms a lignotuber. It has rough, tessellated dark gray bark on some, rarely all of the trunk, smooth creamy white bark above that is shed in thin scales. Young plants and coppice regrowth have leaves that are heart-shaped to egg-shaped at first, later lance shaped, 55–240 mm (2.2–9.4 in) long and 35–140 mm (1.4–5.5 in) wide. Adult leaves are the same shade of green on both sides, egg-shaped to broadly lance-shaped, 60–210 mm (2.4–8.3 in) long and 10–75 mm (0.39–2.95 in) wide, tapering to a petiole 7–33 mm (0.28–1.30 in) long. The tree is usually leafless by the middle of the dry season. The flower buds are arranged in leaf axils on a branched peduncle 2–40 mm (0.079–1.575 in) long, each branch of the peduncle with seven buds on pedicels 12–32 mm (0.47–1.26 in) long. Mature buds are smooth and glossy, pear-shaped, 6–8 mm (0.24–0.31 in) long and 4–7 mm (0.16–0.28 in) wide with a rounded to flattened operculum. Flowering occurs from June to November and the flowers are creamy white. The fruit is a thin-walled, cup-shaped to cylindrical or barrel-shaped capsule 9–15 mm (0.35–0.59 in) long and 8–11 mm (0.31–0.43 in) wide on a pedicel 8–31 mm (0.31–1.22 in) long.

== Taxonomy and naming ==
This bloodwood was first formally described in 1859 by Ferdinand von Mueller who gave it the name Eucalyptus polysciada and published the description in the Journal of the Proceedings of the Linnean Society, Botany. In 1995 Ken Hill and Lawrence Alexander Sidney Johnson changed the name to Corymbia polysciada. The Wagiman peoples know the tree as bolomin.

== Distribution and habitat ==
Corymbia polysciada is widespread and common in the wetter woodlands of the Northern Territory north from near Mataranka, where it grows on stony ridges and on gravelly plains.

== See also ==
- List of Corymbia species
