= Corymbia pocillum =

Scientific classification
- Kingdom: Plantae
- Clade: Embryophytes
- Clade: Tracheophytes
- Clade: Spermatophytes
- Clade: Angiosperms
- Clade: Eudicots
- Clade: Rosids
- Order: Myrtales
- Family: Myrtaceae
- Genus: Corymbia
- Species: C. pocillum

Binomial name
- Corymbia pocillum (D.J.Carr & S.G.M.Carr) K.D.Hill & L.A.S.Johnson

Synonyms
- Eucalyptus pocillum D.J.Carr & S.G.M.Carr

Species of plant

Corymbia pocillum is a species of tree that is endemic to a small area in Queensland. It has rough flaky bark on the trunk, sometimes also on the larger branches, smooth bark above, lance-shaped adult leaves, flower buds in groups of seven, white flowers and urn-shaped to almost spherical fruit.

== Description ==
Corymbia pocillum is a tree that typically grows to a height of 10 m (33 ft) and forms a lignotuber. Young plants and coppice regrowth have glabrous, linear to lance-shaped leaves that are up to 180 mm (7.1 in) long, 30 mm (1.2 in) wide and petiolate. Adult leaves are arranged alternately, the same shade of dull green on both sides, lance-shaped, 80–205 mm (3.1–8.1 in) long and 7–30 mm (0.28–1.18 in) wide, tapering to a petiole 11–27 mm (0.43–1.06 in) long. The flower buds are arranged on the ends of branchlets on a branched peduncle 4–16 mm (0.16–0.63 in) long, each branch of the peduncle with seven buds on pedicels 2–7 mm (0.079–0.276 in) long. Mature buds are oval or pear-shaped, 5–6 mm (0.20–0.24 in) long and 4–6 mm (0.16–0.24 in) wide with a rounded or flattened operculum. Flowering occurs between April and July and the flowers are white. The fruit is a woody urn-shaped to almost spherical capsule 180 mm (7.1 in) long and 30 mm (1.2 in) wide with a thin, flared rim and the valves enclosed in the fruit.

== Taxonomy and naming ==
Corymbia pocillum was first formally described in 1987 by Denis John Carr and Stella Grace Maisie Carr who gave it the name Eucalyptus pocillum and published the description in their book Eucalyptus II - The rubber cuticle, and other studies of the Corymbosae. They collected the type specimens between Georgetown and Normanton in 1971. In 1995, Ken Hill and Lawrie Johnson changed the name to Corymbia pocillum, publishing the change in the journal Telopea. The specific epithet (pocillum) is a Latin noun meaning "a little cup".

== Distribution and habitat ==
This eucalypt grows in sandy soil on sandstone and granite around Normanton and south of there towards Hughenden.

== Conservation status ==
This species is listed as of "least concern" under the Queensland Government Nature Conservation Act 1992.

== See also ==
- List of Corymbia species
