= Corymbia arafurica =

Scientific classification
- Kingdom: Plantae
- Clade: Embryophytes
- Clade: Tracheophytes
- Clade: Spermatophytes
- Clade: Angiosperms
- Clade: Eudicots
- Clade: Rosids
- Order: Myrtales
- Family: Myrtaceae
- Genus: Corymbia
- Species: C. arafurica

Binomial name
- Corymbia arafurica K.D.Hill & L.A.S.Johnson

Species of plant

Corymbia arafurica is a species of tree that is endemic to the Northern Territory. It has smooth bark, lance-shaped adult leaves, flower buds in groups of three or seven, creamy white flowers and cylindrical to barrel-shaped fruit.

== Description ==
Corymbia arafurica is a tree that typically grows to a height of 15 m (49 ft) and forms a lignotuber. It has smooth, powdery white to greyish bark that is shed in thin scales, sometimes with a short stocking of rough bark near the base of the trunk. Young plants and coppice regrowth dull green, egg-shaped to lance-shaped leaves that are 150–250 mm (5.9–9.8 in) long and 70–120 mm (2.8–4.7 in) wide. Adult leaves are the same shade of glossy green on both sides, lance-shaped, 80–207 mm (3.1–8.1 in) long and 13–55 mm (0.51–2.17 in) wide on a petiole 5–26 mm (0.20–1.02 in) long. The flower buds are arranged in leaf axils on a branched peduncle 1–9 mm (0.039–0.354 in) long, each branch with three or seven buds, the individual buds on pedicels 2–11 mm (0.079–0.433 in) long. Mature buds are pear-shaped, 5–8 mm (0.20–0.31 in) long and 4–6 mm (0.16–0.24 in) wide with a rounded, sometimes pointed operculum. Flowering occurs from September to October and the flowers are creamy white. The fruit is a woody cylindrical to barrel-shaped capsule 9–12 mm (0.35–0.47 in) long and 6–10 mm (0.24–0.39 in) wide with the valves enclosed in the fruit.

== Taxonomy and naming ==
Eucalyptus arafurica was first formally described in 1995 by Ken Hill and Lawrie Johnson from specimens collected near Oenpelli (present-day Gunbalanya) by Raymond Specht in 1948. The specific epithet (arafurica) refers to the occurrence of this species near the Arafura Sea.

The status of this species is unclear. Ian Brooker has suggested that it may be synonymous with C. papuana.

== Distribution and habitat ==
This eucalypt is common near watercourses and on headlands in the wetter areas of the Top End of the Northern Territory between Port Keats, Darwin, Yirrkala and the Wessel Islands.

== See also ==
- List of Corymbia species
