= Corymbia torta =

Scientific classification
- Kingdom: Plantae
- Clade: Tracheophytes
- Clade: Angiosperms
- Clade: Eudicots
- Clade: Rosids
- Order: Myrtales
- Family: Myrtaceae
- Genus: Corymbia
- Species: C. torta

Binomial name
- Corymbia torta K.D.Hill & L.A.S.Johnson

Species of plant

Corymbia torta is a species of tree that is endemic to the Kimberley region of Western Australia. It has smooth bark, lance-shaped adult leaves, flower buds in groups of three or seven, creamy white flowers and cup-shaped, cylindrical or barrel-shaped fruit.

== Description ==
Corymbia torta is a tree that typically grows to a height of 12 to 15 metres (39 to 49 ft) and forms a lignotuber. It has smooth, sometimes powdery white, cream-coloured or pale grey bark that is shed from the tree in thin scales. The adult leaves are arranged alternately, lance-shaped, wavy and twisted, the same shade of glossy green on both sides, 70–175 mm (2.8–6.9 in) long and 7–25 mm (0.28–0.98 in) wide, tapering to a flattened or channelled petiole 5–22 mm (0.20–0.87 in) long. The flowers are borne on the ends of branchlets on a branched peduncle, each branch of the peduncle with three or seven buds on pedicels 2–7 mm (0.079–0.276 in) long. Mature buds are pear-shaped to spherical, 5–6 mm (0.20–0.24 in) long and 3–4 mm (0.12–0.16 in) wide with a rounded to flattened operculum. Flowering has been observed in November and the flowers are creamy white. The fruit is a woody cup-shaped, cylindrical or barrel-shaped fruit 6–9 mm (0.24–0.35 in) long and 5–9 mm (0.20–0.35 in) wide with the valves enclosed in the fruit.

== Taxonomy and naming ==
Corymbia torta was first formally described in 1995 by Ken Hill and Lawrie Johnson in the journal Telopea from specimens collected in 1999 by Hill and Leonie Stanberg, near Mount Jameson on the upper Drysdale River. The specific epithet (torta) is from the Latin tortus meaning "twisted", referring to the adult leaves.

In the same journal paper, Hill and Johnson described three subspecies and the names are accepted by the Australian Plant Census:

- Corymbia torta subsp. allanii K.D.Hill & L.A.S.Johnson;
- Corymbia torat subsp. mixtifolia K.D.Hill & L.A.S.Johnson;
- Corymbia torta K.D.Hill & L.A.S.Johnson subsp. torta.

== Distribution and habitat ==
This eucalypt is found in the Wunaamin Miliwundi Ranges, Mitchell River National Park and Drysdale River National Park in the Central Kimberley and Northern Kimberley biogeographic regions It grows in skeletal sandy soils over sandstone or granite.

== Conservation status ==
All three subspecies of C. torta are classified as "not threatened" by the Western Australian Government Department of Parks and Wildlife.

== See also ==
- List of Corymbia species
