= Corymbia arnhemensis =

Katherine Gorge bloodwood

Scientific classification
- Kingdom: Plantae
- Clade: Tracheophytes
- Clade: Angiosperms
- Clade: Eudicots
- Clade: Rosids
- Order: Myrtales
- Family: Myrtaceae
- Genus: Corymbia
- Species: C. arnhemensis

Binomial name
- Corymbia arnhemensis (D.J.Carr & S.G.M.Carr) K.D.Hill & L.A.S.Johnson

Synonyms
- Corymbia arnhemensis (D.J.Carr & S.G.M.Carr) K.D.Hill & L.A.S.Johnson subsp. arnhemensis; Eucalyptus arnhemensis D.J.Carr & S.G.M.Carr

Species of plant

Corymbia arnhemensis, commonly known as Katherine Gorge bloodwood, is a species of slender tree that is endemic to the Top End of the Northern Territory. It has rough bark on some or all of the trunk, sometimes the larger branches, smooth bark above, lance-shaped to curved adult leaves, flower buds in groups of seven, white flowers and urn-shaped fruit.

== Description ==
Corymbia arnhemensis is a slender tree that typically grows to a height of 15 metres (49 ft) and forms a lignotuber. It has rough grey to grey brown, tessellated bark on part or all of the trunk, sometimes also the larger branches, and smooth white to grey or pinkish bark above. Young plants a coppice regrowth have elliptical to egg-shaped or lance-shaped leaves that are 35–115 mm (1.4–4.5 in) long and 20–40 mm (0.79–1.57 in) wide. The adult leaves are arranged alternately, dull green on the upper surface, paler below, lance-shaped to curved, 75–180 mm (3.0–7.1 in) long and 8–18 mm (0.31–0.71 in) wide tapering to a petiole 6–25 mm (0.24–0.98 in) long. The flower buds are arranged on a slender, branched peduncle 4–15 mm (0.16–0.59 in) long, each branch with seven buds on pedicels 1–9 mm (0.039–0.354 in) long. Mature buds are oval to narrow pear-shaped, 4–6 mm (0.16–0.24 in) long and 3–4 mm (0.12–0.16 in) wide with a rounded to conical operculum.

Flowering has been observed in November and from February to April and the flowers are white. The fruit is a woody urn-shaped capsule 8–14 mm (0.31–0.55 in) long and 6–10 mm (0.24–0.39 in) wide with the valves enclosed in the fruit.

== Taxonomy and naming ==
The Katherine Gorge bloodwood was first formally described in 1985 by Denis Carr and Stella Carr from specimens collected near Oenpelli (present day Gunbalanya) by Raymond Specht in 1948, and was given the name Eucalyptus arnhemensis. In 1995 Ken Hill and Lawrie Johnson changed the name to Corymbia arnhemensis. The specific epithet (arnhemensis) refers to the occurrence of this species in Arnhem Land.

== Distribution and habitat ==
Corymbia arnhemensis is endemic to the Top End of the Northern Territory between Jabiluka and Katherine Gorge in Nitmiluk National Park, and grows among sandstone rocks, usually on escarpments and on ridges in shallow sandy soil.

== See also ==
- List of Corymbia species
