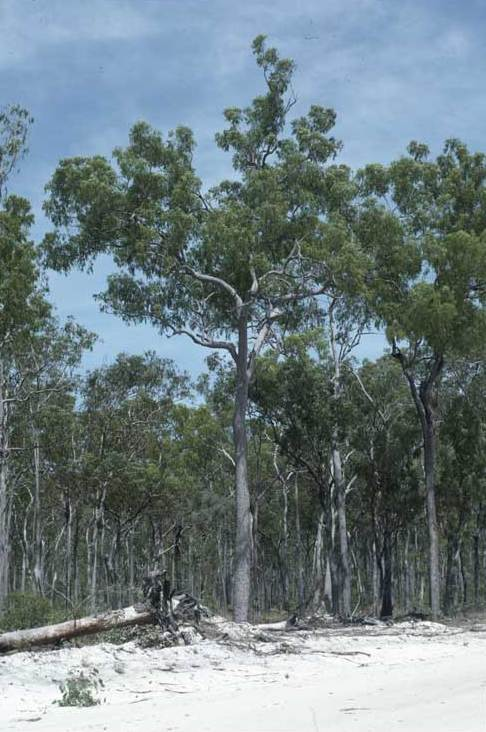
- Corymbia nesophila north of Musgrave

Scientific classification
- Kingdom: Plantae
- Clade: Embryophytes
- Clade: Tracheophytes
- Clade: Spermatophytes
- Clade: Angiosperms
- Clade: Eudicots
- Clade: Rosids
- Order: Myrtales
- Family: Myrtaceae
- Genus: Corymbia
- Species: C. nesophila

Binomial name
- Corymbia nesophila (Blakely) K.D.Hill & L.A.S.Johnson

Synonyms
- Eucalyptus nesophila Blakely

= Corymbia nesophila =

Melville Island bloodwood

Species of plant

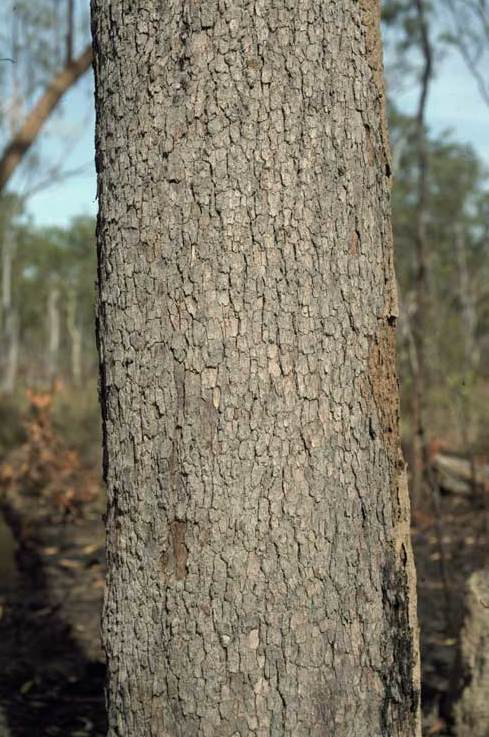
bark

Corymbia nesophila, commonly known as Melville Island bloodwood, is a species of tree that is endemic to northern Australia. It has rough, tessellated bark on the trunk and branches, lance-shaped or curved adult leaves, flower buds in groups of seven, creamy white flowers and urn-shaped fruit.

== Description ==
Corymbia nesophila is a tree that typically grows to a height of 7 to 30 metres (23 to 98 ft) and forms a lignotuber. It has rough, fibrous, greyish brown, tessellated to crumbly bark on the trunk and branches. Young plants and coppice regrowth have dull green leaves that are paler on the lower surface, mostly heart-shaped to egg-shaped, 48–125 mm (1.9–4.9 in) long and 23–80 mm (0.91–3.15 in) wide and petiolate. Adult leaves are glossy green, slightly paler on the lower surface, lance-shaped to curved, 73–210 mm (2.9–8.3 in) long and 7–28 mm (0.28–1.10 in) wide, tapering to a petiole 9–23 mm (0.35–0.91 in) long. The flower buds are arranged on the ends of branchlets on a branched peduncle 5–17 mm (0.20–0.67 in) long, each branch of the peduncle with seven buds on pedicels 3–11 mm (0.12–0.43 in) long. Mature buds are oval to pear-shaped, 5–7 mm (0.20–0.28 in) long and 3–5 mm (0.12–0.20 in) wide with a conical to rounded operculum with a small point in the centre. Flowering occurs between May and August and the flowers are creamy white. The fruit is an urn-shaped capsule with thin walls and the valves enclosed in the fruit.

== Taxonomy and naming ==
The Melville Island bloodwood was first described in 1934 by William Blakely who gave it the name Eucalyptus nesophila and published the description in his book A Key to the Eucalypts. In 1995, Ken Hill and Lawrie Johnson changed the name to Corymbia nesophila.

== Distribution and habitat ==
Corymbia nesophila has a disjunct distribution throughout the tropical north of Australia and is common in the east Kimberley region of Western Australia, the top end and islands off the coast of the Northern Territory and on the Cape York Peninsula of Queensland. It grows on basalt or laterite on the lower slopes and flat areas with sandy or sandy-loam soils.

== See also ==
- List of Corymbia species
