= Corymbia 'Summer Red' =

Flowering plant cultivar

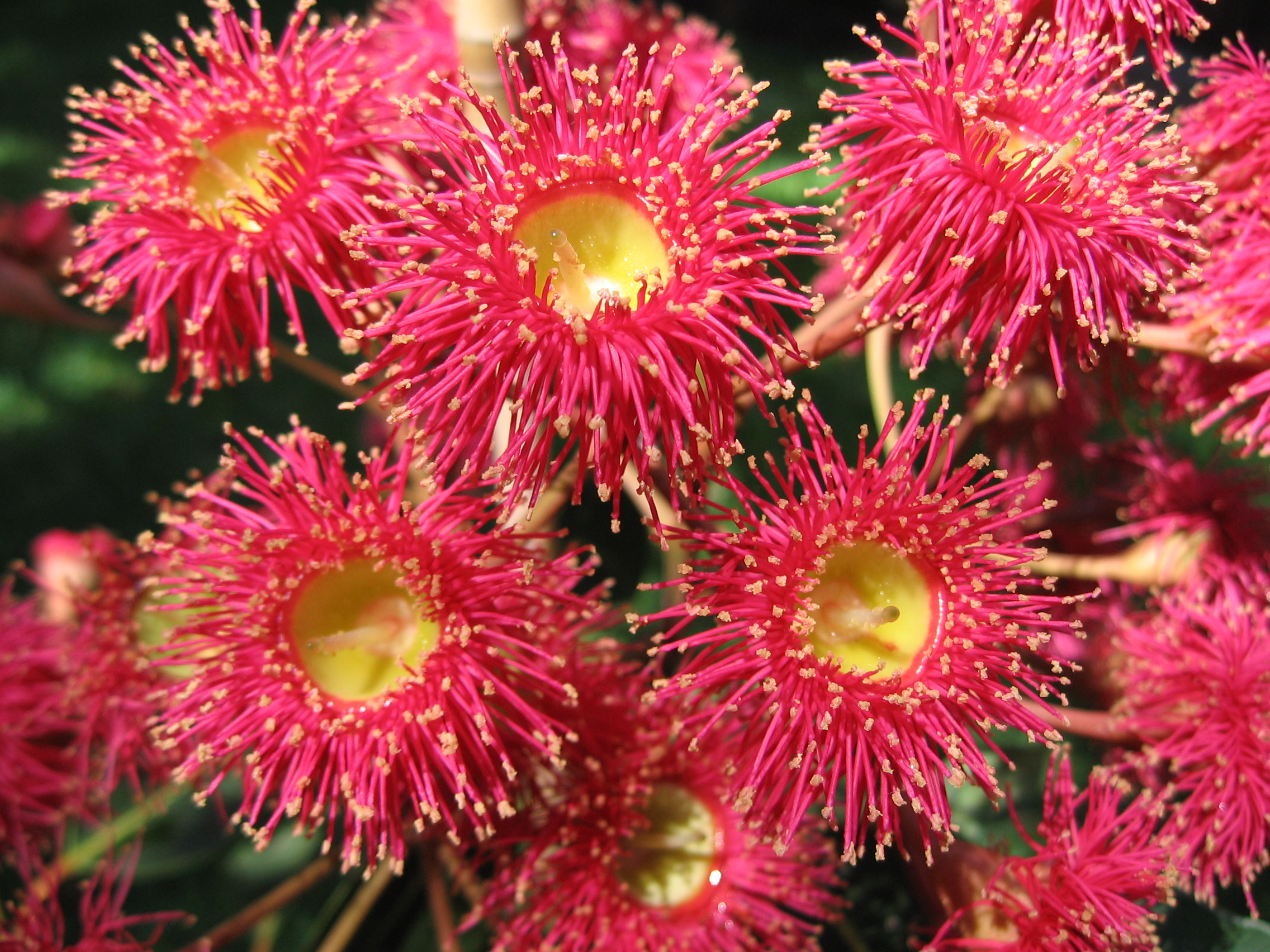
- Flowers
- Hybrid parentage: Corymbia hybrid C. ficifolia × C. ptychocarpa
- Cultivar: 'Summer Red'

Corymbia 'Summer Red' is a cultivar of Corymbia, bred for a large mass of bright red flowers. It is a hybrid of C. ficifolia and C. ptychocarpa. It can grow to a height of five metres.
