= Maxwell Ralph Jacobs =

Maxwell Ralph Jacobs (25 February 1905 – 9 October 1979) was an Australian forester.

Jacobs was born in North Adelaide and attended Unley High School and then the University of Adelaide. He began his career as a forest assessor in the Australian Capital Territory in 1926 and was appointed chief forester in 1928. He completed further studies and served in the military during World War II.

In 1932 Eucalyptus jacobsiana, specimens of which had been collected by Jacobs, was named in his honour by William Blakely. Other species collected and described by Jacobs include; Eucalyptus niphophloia, Eucalyptus camaldulensis Dehnh. var. pendula and Eucalyptus abbreviata all named in 1934.

Following the war Jacobs was appointed as principal and lecturer in silviculture at the Australian Forestry School and remained there for the next fifteen years.

In 1955 The Growth Habits of the Eucalypts was published by the Commonwealth Government Printer, and consolidated much of Jacobs' work. The book became a standard text in all countries growing eucalypts around the world.

In 1961 Jacobs was appointed as director-general of the Commonwealth Forestry and Timber Bureau and played a role in the formation of the Australian Forestry Council in 1964. After his retirement in February of 1970, he continued to work occasionally as a consultant to organizations such as the Food and Agriculture Organization.

Jacobs died on 9 October 1979 in Woden Valley Hospital in Canberra. A street in Wright is named in his honour.
