= Ken Hill (botanist) =

Australian botanist (1948–2010)

Kenneth D. Hill (6 August 1948 – 4 August 2010) was an Australian botanist, notable for his work on eucalypts, the systematics, evolution and conservation of the genus Cycas, as well as on botanical informatics.

He was born in Armidale, New South Wales. He worked with the National Herbarium of New South Wales from 1983 until retiring in 2004. He was also a senior research scientist with the Royal Botanic Gardens, Sydney.

The standard author abbreviation K.D.Hill is used to indicate this person as the author when citing a botanical name.
