= Corymbia scabrida =

Rough-leaved yellowjacket

Scientific classification
- Kingdom: Plantae
- Clade: Embryophytes
- Clade: Tracheophytes
- Clade: Spermatophytes
- Clade: Angiosperms
- Clade: Eudicots
- Clade: Rosids
- Order: Myrtales
- Family: Myrtaceae
- Genus: Corymbia
- Species: C. scabrida

Binomial name
- Corymbia scabrida (Brooker & A.R.Bean) K.D.Hill & L.A.S.Johnson

Synonyms
- Eucalyptus scabrida Brooker & A.R.Bean

Species of plant

Corymbia scabrida, commonly known as rough-leaved yellowjacket, is a species of small tree that is endemic to central Queensland. It has rough, tessellated bark on the trunk and branches, a crown of juvenile and intermediate leaves, flower buds in groups of seven, white flowers and barrel-shaped to urn-shaped or shortened spherical fruit.

== Description ==
Corymbia scabrida is a tree that typically grows to a height of 15 metres (49 ft) and forms a lignotuber. It has tessellated, pale brown to yellow-brown or orange bark on the trunk and branches. Young plants and coppice regrowth have more or less egg-shaped leaves that are 50–185 mm (2.0–7.3 in) long, 40–55 mm (1.6–2.2 in) wide and hairy with the petiole attached to the underside of the leaf blade. The crown of the tree has both intermediate and juvenile leaves that are the same shade of dull greyish green on both sides, 65–125 mm (2.6–4.9 in) long, 20–35 mm (0.79–1.38 in) wide and rough with a petiole 8–17 mm (0.31–0.67 in) long attached to the underside of the leaf blade. The flower buds are arranged on the ends of branchlets on a branched peduncle 9–26 mm (0.35–1.02 in) long, each branch of the peduncle with seven buds that are sessile or on pedicels up to 3 mm (0.12 in) long. Mature buds are oval, about 7 mm (0.28 in) long and 6 mm (0.24 in) wide with a rounded to flattened operculum that has a point or a knob in the centre. Flowering has been observed in October and the flowers are white. The fruit is a woody barrel-shaped to urn-shaped or shortened spherical capsule 50–185 mm (2.0–7.3 in) long and 40–55 mm (1.6–2.2 in) wide 8–13 mm (0.31–0.51 in) long and 8–11 mm (0.31–0.43 in) wide.

== Taxonomy and naming ==
This yellow bloodwood was first formally described in 1991 by Ian Brooker and Anthony Bean who gave it the name Eucalyptus scabrida and published the description in the journal Austrobaileya. In 1995 Ken Hill and Lawrie Johnson changed the name to Corymbia scabrida. The specific epithet (scabrida) is from the Latin word scabridus meaning "somewhat scabrous".

== Distribution and habitat ==
Corymbia scabrida grows on low sandstone ridges and hills in shallow, sandy, loamy or gravelly soils. It is found in woodland communities and is often co-dominant in association with Eucalyptus melanophloia, E. chloroclada, Corymbia clarksoniana, C. polycarpa and Angophora leiocarpa. It occurs from west of Springsure to near Tambo.

== Conservation status ==
Rough-leaved yellowjacket is classified as "near threatened" under the Queensland Government Nature Conservation Act 1992.

== See also ==
- List of Corymbia species
