= Corymbia novoguinensis =

Scientific classification
- Kingdom: Plantae
- Clade: Embryophytes
- Clade: Tracheophytes
- Clade: Spermatophytes
- Clade: Angiosperms
- Clade: Eudicots
- Clade: Rosids
- Order: Myrtales
- Family: Myrtaceae
- Genus: Corymbia
- Species: C. novoguinensis

Binomial name
- Corymbia novoguinensis (D.J.Carr & S.G.M.Carr) K.D.Hill & L.A.S.Johnson

Synonyms
- Eucalyptus novoguinensis D.J.Carr & S.G.M.Carr

Species of plant

Corymbia novoguinensis is a species of tree that is native to New Guinea, some Torres Strait Island and the Cape York Peninsula. It has rough bark on the trunk and branches, lance-shaped adult leaves, flower buds in groups of seven, creamy white flowers and urn-shaped to barrel-shaped fruit.

== Description ==
Corymbia novoguinensis is a tree that typically grows to a height of 25 m (82 ft) and forms a lignotuber. It has rough, fissured, flaky or fibrous and tessellated bark on the trunk and branches. The adult leaves are glossy green but paler on the lower surface, lance-shaped, 100–210 mm (3.9–8.3 in) long and 12–35 mm (0.47–1.38 in) wide, tapering to a petiole 15–25 mm (0.59–0.98 in) long. The flower buds are arranged on the ends of branchlets on a branched peduncle 7–16 mm (0.28–0.63 in) long, each branch of the peduncle with seven buds on pedicels 4–18 mm (0.16–0.71 in) long. Mature buds are oval to pear-shaped, 11–12 mm (0.43–0.47 in) long and 6–7 mm (0.24–0.28 in) wide with a rounded to conical operculum. Flowering has been observed in August and the flowers are creamy white. The fruit is a woody urn-shaped to barrel-shaped capsule 17–24 mm (0.67–0.94 in) long and 11–15 mm (0.43–0.59 in) wide.

Corymbia novoguinensis is similar to C. clarksoniana, C. ligans and C. polycarpa, but is distinguished from them on the basis of fruit shape.

== Taxonomy and naming ==
This eucalypt was first formally described in 1987 by Denis Carr and Stella Carr from specimens collected on Daru Island in Papua New Guinea, and was given the name Eucalyptus novoguinensis. In 1995 Ken Hill and Lawrie Johnson changed the name to Corymbia novoguinensis. The specific epithet (novoguinensis) is a reference to the type location.

== Distribution and habitat ==
This species grows in coastal area of southern Papua New Guinea, south-eastern Irian Jaya, some Torres Strait Islands and the northern part of the Cape York Peninsula.

== See also ==
- List of Corymbia species
