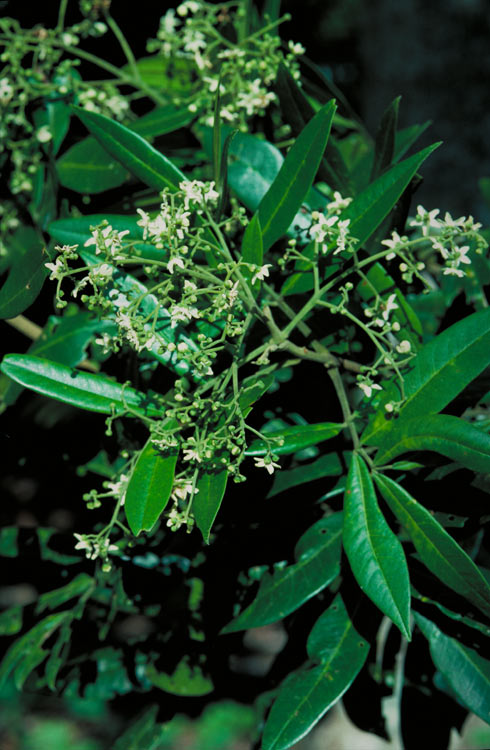

Scientific classification
- Kingdom: Plantae
- Clade: Tracheophytes
- Clade: Angiosperms
- Clade: Eudicots
- Clade: Rosids
- Order: Sapindales
- Family: Rutaceae
- Genus: Flindersia
- Species: F. bourjotiana

Binomial name
- Flindersia bourjotiana C.T.White

Synonyms
- Flindersia tysoni C.DC.

= Flindersia bourjotiana =

Queensland silver ash

Species of tree

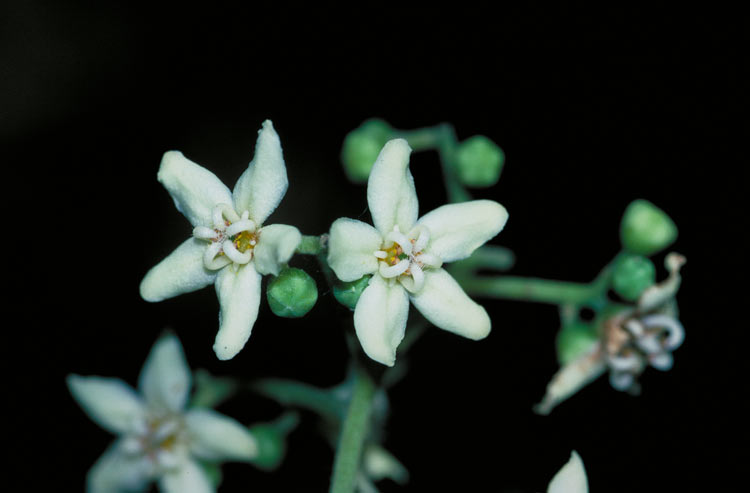
Flower detail

Flindersia bourjotiana, commonly known as Queensland silver ash, northern silver ash, or white ash, is a species of tree that is endemic to Queensland. It has pinnate leaves arranged in opposite pairs and with between four and eight narrow egg-shaped to elliptic leaflets, greenish white flowers arranged in panicles, and fruit studded with short, rough points.

== Description ==
Flindersia bourjotiana is a tree that typically grows to a height of 35 m (115 ft). Its leaves are pinnate, arranged in opposite pairs with between four and eight narrow egg-shaped to elliptical leaflets mostly 55–170 mm (2.2–6.7 in) long and 15–48 mm (0.59–1.89 in) wide, the side leaflets on petiolules 1.5–4 mm (0.059–0.157 in) long, the end leaflet on a petiolule 10–20 mm (0.39–0.79 in) long. The flowers are arranged in panicles 120–240 mm (4.7–9.4 in) long and have five sepals 1–2 mm (0.039–0.079 in) long and five white or greenish white petals 5–9.5 mm (0.20–0.37 in) long. Flowering occurs from April to November and the fruit is a capsule 70–150 mm (2.8–5.9 in) long, studded with short, rough points, and separating into five at maturity, and releasing seeds that are winged at both ends.

== Taxonomy ==
Flindersia bourjotiana was first formally described in 1875 by Ferdinand von Mueller in Fragmenta phytographiae Australiae.

== Distribution and habitat ==
Queensland silver ash grows in rainforest from sea level to an altitudes of 1,100 m (3,600 ft) from the McIvor River (near Mount Webb National Park) to Rockingham Bay in far north Queensland.

== Conservation status ==
Flindersia bourjotiana is classified as of "least concern" under the Queensland Government Nature Conservation Act 1992.
