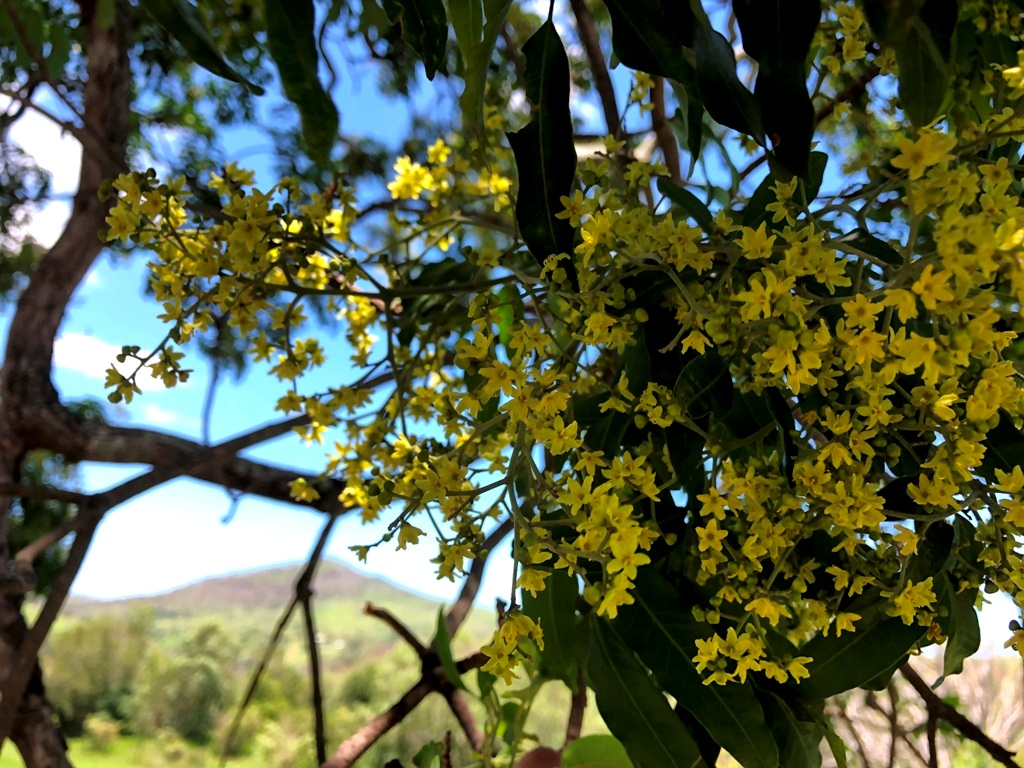

Scientific classification
- Kingdom: Plantae
- Clade: Tracheophytes
- Clade: Angiosperms
- Clade: Eudicots
- Clade: Rosids
- Order: Sapindales
- Family: Rutaceae
- Genus: Flindersia
- Species: F. xanthoxyla

Binomial name
- Flindersia xanthoxyla (A.Cunn.) ex Hook. Domin

Synonyms
- Flindersia oxleyana F.Muell. nom. illeg.; Oxleya xanthoxyla A.Cunn. ex Hook.F.Muell.

= Flindersia xanthoxyla =

Yellowwood

Species of flowering plant

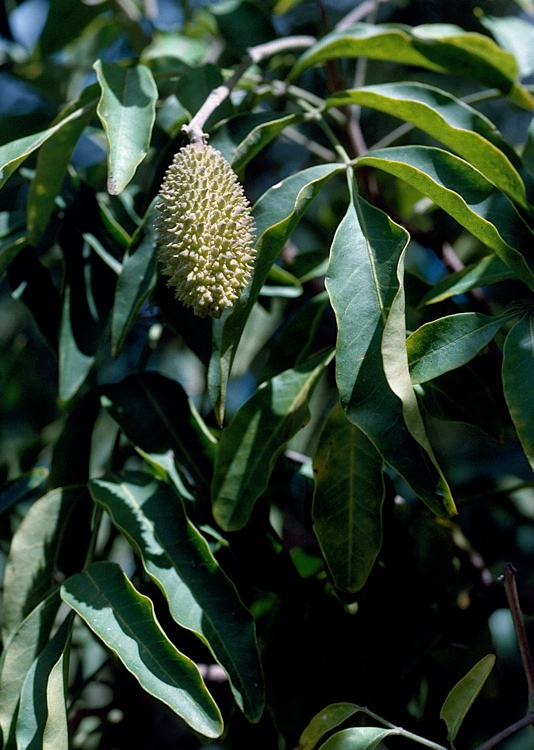
Fruit

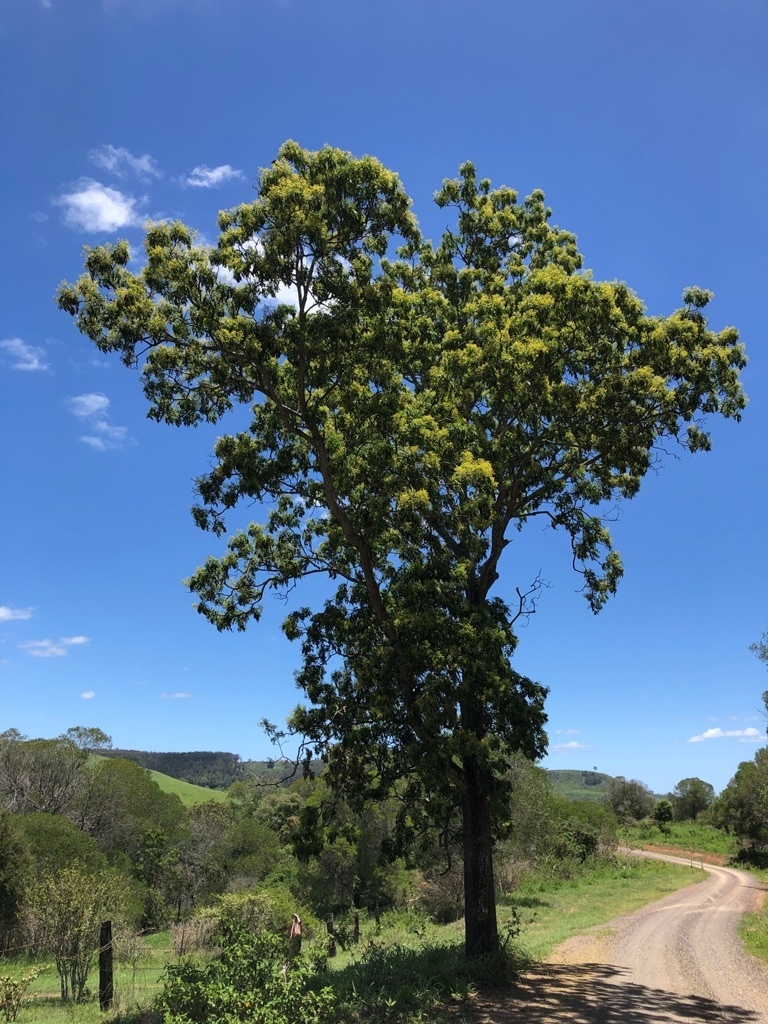
Habit in the Lockyer Valley

Flindersia xanthoxyla, commonly known as yellowwood, long jack or yellowwood ash, is a species of rainforest tree that is endemic to eastern Australia. It has pinnate leaves arranged in opposite pairs with seven to eleven leaflets, panicles of yellow flowers and woody fruit studded with rough points on the surface.

== Description ==
Flindersia xanthoxyla is a tree that typically grows to a height of 40–45 m (131–148 ft) with a trunk diameter of 90 cm (35 in). The trunk is cylindrical and straight with grey or brownish grey bark. The bark features vertical fissures, and is shed in small flakes. The smaller branches show distinct leaf scars, with star-shaped hairs on new growth. The leaves are pinnate, 110–320 mm (4.3–12.6 in) long and arranged in opposite pairs with seven to eleven egg-shaped to elliptical leaflets. The leaflets are mostly 40–130 mm (1.6–5.1 in) long and 10–32 mm (0.39–1.26 in) wide, the side leaflets sessile or on a petiolule up to 6 mm (0.24 in) long and the end leaflet on a petiolule 8–28 mm (0.31–1.10 in) long. The leaflets are bright green above, paler below. The flowers are arranged in panicles in leaf axils or on the ends of branchlets and are 170–250 mm (6.7–9.8 in) long. The sepals are about 1 mm (0.039 in) long and the petals yellow or pale yellow, 4–4.5 mm (0.16–0.18 in) long. Flowering occurs from October to February and the fruit is a woody capsule 65–110 mm (2.6–4.3 in) long, studded with rough points up to 4 mm (0.16 in) long. At maturity it separates into five valves, releasing winged seeds 33–50 mm (1.3–2.0 in) long.

== Taxonomy ==
Yellowwood was first formally described in 1830 by Charles Fraser from an unpublished manuscript by Allan Cunningham who gave it the name Oxleya xanthoxyla. The description was published in William Jackson Hooker's Botanical Miscellany. In 1927 Karel Domin changed the name to Flindersia xanthoxyla.

== Distribution and habitat ==
Flindersia xanthoxyla grows in dry and subtropical rainforest at altitudes between 75 and 500 m (246 and 1,640 ft) from the Richmond River in north-eastern New South Wales to Gympie in south eastern Queensland.

== Conservation status ==
Flindersia xanthoxyla is classified as of "least concern" under the Queensland Government Nature Conservation Act 1992.

== Uses ==
An ornamental tree, it is also planted for shade. It was previously used for timber in the construction of coaches, cabinet making, flooring, tool handles, lining, ammunition boxes, artificial limbs and joinery. The timber has steam bending qualities.
