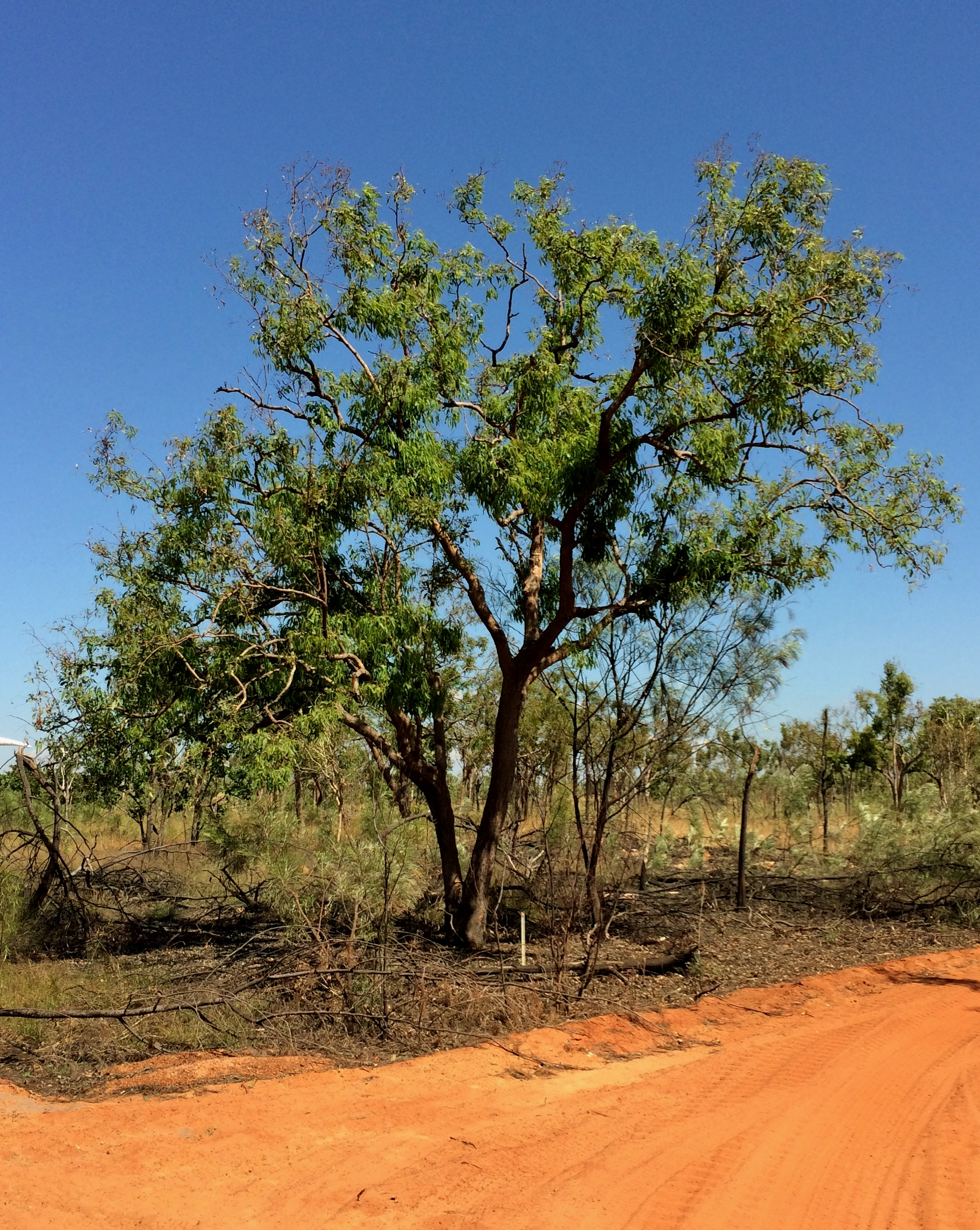
- Long-fruited bloodwood, Kimberley, WA, Australia

Scientific classification
- Kingdom: Plantae
- Clade: Tracheophytes
- Clade: Angiosperms
- Clade: Eudicots
- Clade: Rosids
- Order: Myrtales
- Family: Myrtaceae
- Genus: Corymbia
- Species: C. polycarpa

Binomial name
- Corymbia polycarpa (F.Muell.) K.D.Hill & L.A.S.Johnson

Synonyms
- Eucalyptus derbeyensis D.J.Carr & S.G.M.Carr; Eucalyptus erubescens D.J.Carr & S.G.M.Carr; Eucalyptus polycarpa F.Muell.; Eucalyptus pyrophora var. polycarpa (F.Muell.) Maiden nom. illeg.; Eucalyptus terminalis var. carnosa F.M.Bailey nom. inval., nom. prov.; Eucalyptus terminalis auct. non F.Muell.: Bentham, G. (1867); Eucalyptus terminalis auct. non F.Muell.: Blakely, W.F. (1934)

= Corymbia polycarpa =

Long-fruited bloodwood

Species of plant

Corymbia polycarpa, also known as long-fruited bloodwood or small-flowered bloodwood, is a species of tree that is endemic to northern Australia. Indigenous Australians of different language groups have different names for the tree. The Nungali peoples know the tree as narrga or gunjid, the Mulluk-Mulluk know it as dawart, the Yangman know it as bodog, the Gurindji peoples as jadburru and the Wagiman as jagatjjin. It is a medium-sized tree with rough, tessellated bark on the trunk and branches, lance-shaped to curved adult leaves, flower buds in groups of seven or nine, white or cream-coloured flowers and barrel-shaped fruit.

== Description ==
Corymbia polycarpa is a tree that typically grows to a height of 5–15 m (16–49 ft), sometimes 25 m (82 ft), and forms a lignotuber. It has rough, tessellated, flaky and brownish bark on the trunk and branches. Older bark is grey brown and newer bark is red-brown in colour. Young plants and coppice regrowth have elliptic to lance-shaped leaves that are up to 250 mm (9.8 in) long, 10–40 mm (0.39–1.57 in) wide and petiolate. Adult leaves are usually glossy green, paler on the lower surface, lance-shaped to curved, 78–208 mm (3.1–8.2 in) long and 10–38 mm (0.39–1.50 in) wide, tapering to a petiole 7–28 mm (0.28–1.10 in) long. The flower buds are arranged on the ends of the branchlets on a branched peduncle 5–25 mm (0.20–0.98 in) long, each branch of the peduncle with seven or nine buds on pedicels 2–12 mm (0.079–0.472 in) long. Mature buds are oval to pear-shaped, 9–14 mm (0.35–0.55 in) long and 5–8 mm (0.20–0.31 in) wide with a rounded to conical operculum. The buds have a whitish scaly surface due to the fragmenting rubber cuticle. Flowering occurs from April to August and the flowers are white or cream-coloured. The fruit is a woody, elongated barrel-shaped capsule 15–35 mm (0.59–1.38 in) long and 8–16 mm (0.31–0.63 in) wide on a pedicel 2–11 mm (0.079–0.433 in) long with the four valves enclosed in the fruit. The seeds are brown, ellipsoidal and 8–13 mm (0.31–0.51 in) long with a wing on the end.

This species is distinguished from C. clarksoniana. C. ligans and C. novoguinensis in the basis of fruit shape.

== Taxonomy ==
The species was first formally described as Eucalyptus polycarpa by the botanist Ferdinand von Mueller in 1859 in the Journal of the Proceedings of the Linnean Society, Botany. It was reclassified into the genus Corymbia in 1995 by Ken Hill and Lawrence Alexander Sidney Johnson in the journal Telopea.

== Distribution ==
Corymbia polycarpa is found in Western Australia, the Northern Territory, Queensland and northwestern New South Wales. The species is quite common between Broome and Derby in Western Australia through the Kimberley region of Western Australia extending east over the Top End of the Northern Territory including nearby islands and across the Gulf of Carpentaria and southern Cape York Peninsula in Queensland. It is found near watercourses, in depressions or on floodplains growing in sandy or silty alluvium and less commonly in cracking clays and in skeletal sandstone or lateritic soils.

== Uses ==
The timber from the tree is a very durable, with an above-ground life expectancy in excess of 40 years which drops to 25 years when used in-ground. The timber is vulnerable to termite attack and untreated sapwood is prone to damage by lyctine borers. It is a hardwood and difficult to work with hand tools. It is mostly used as round timber rather than sawn timber as a result of the numerous kino veins. It has been used as poles, railway sleepers, mining supports, for fencing and house stumps. Indigenous Australians used the gum medicinally as an antiseptic liquid to treat cuts, sores, burns, ulcers and yaws.

== See also ==
- List of Corymbia species

== Gallery ==
Features of the long-fruited bloodwood (Corymbia polycarpa)
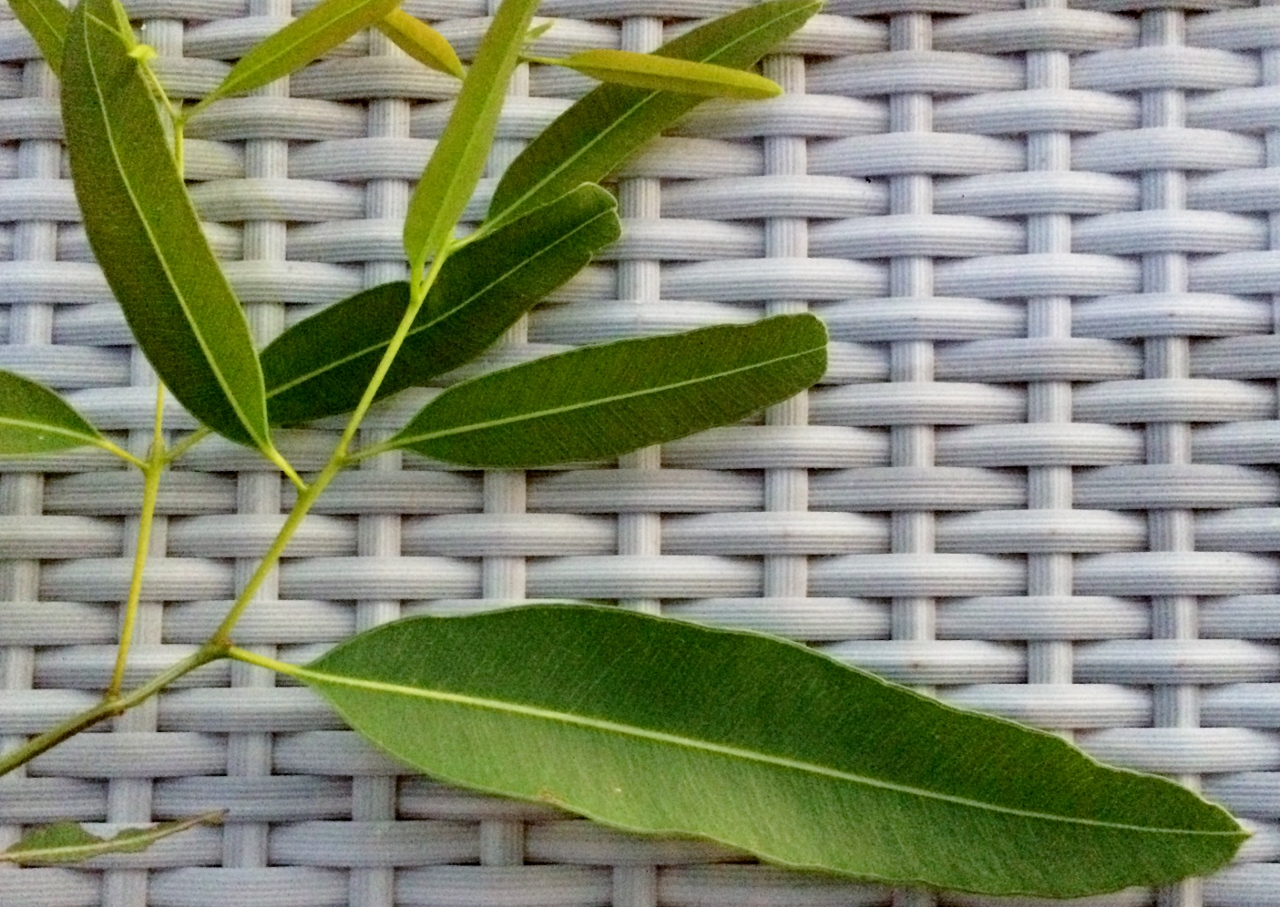
Adult leaves

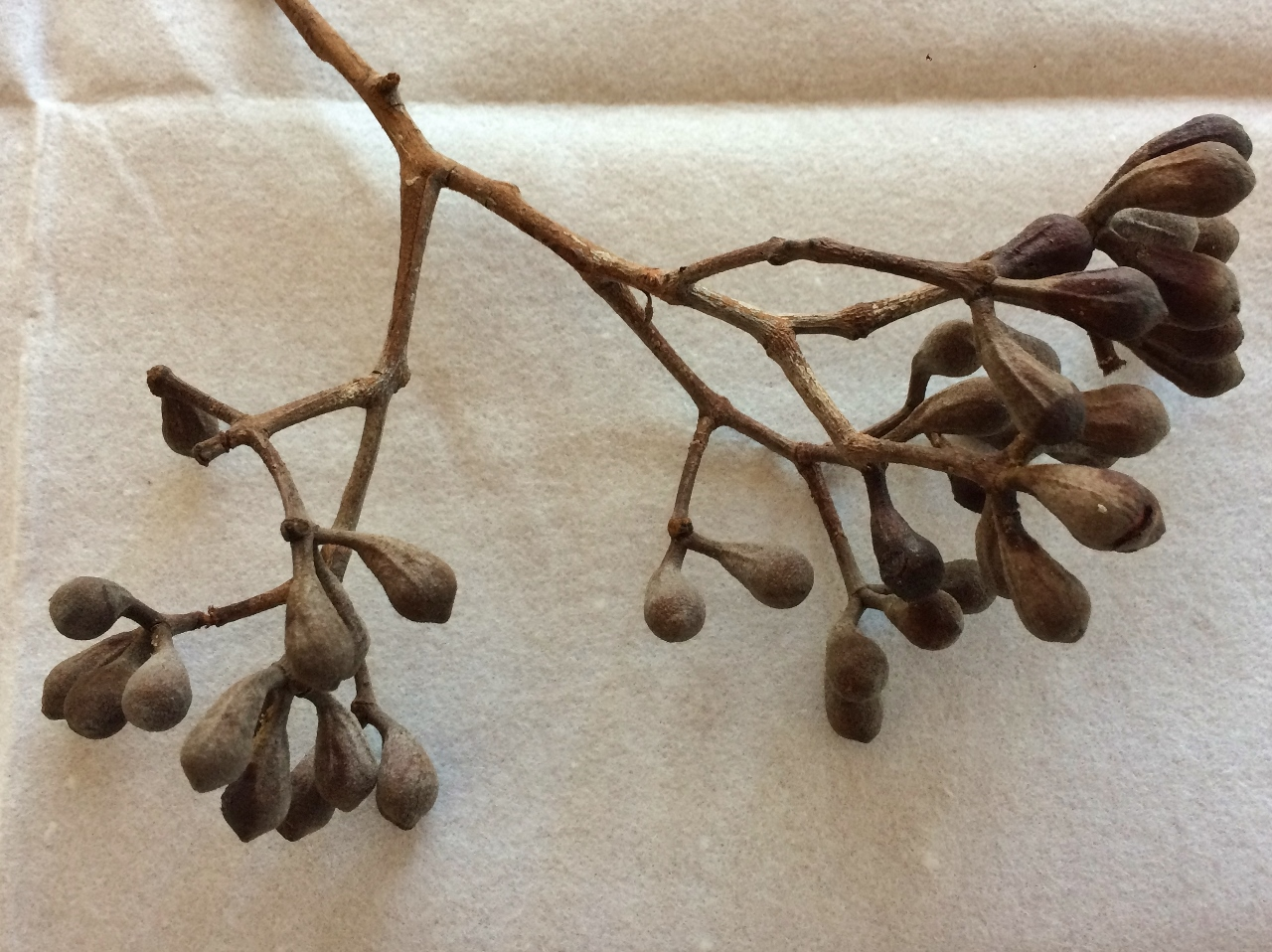
Buds

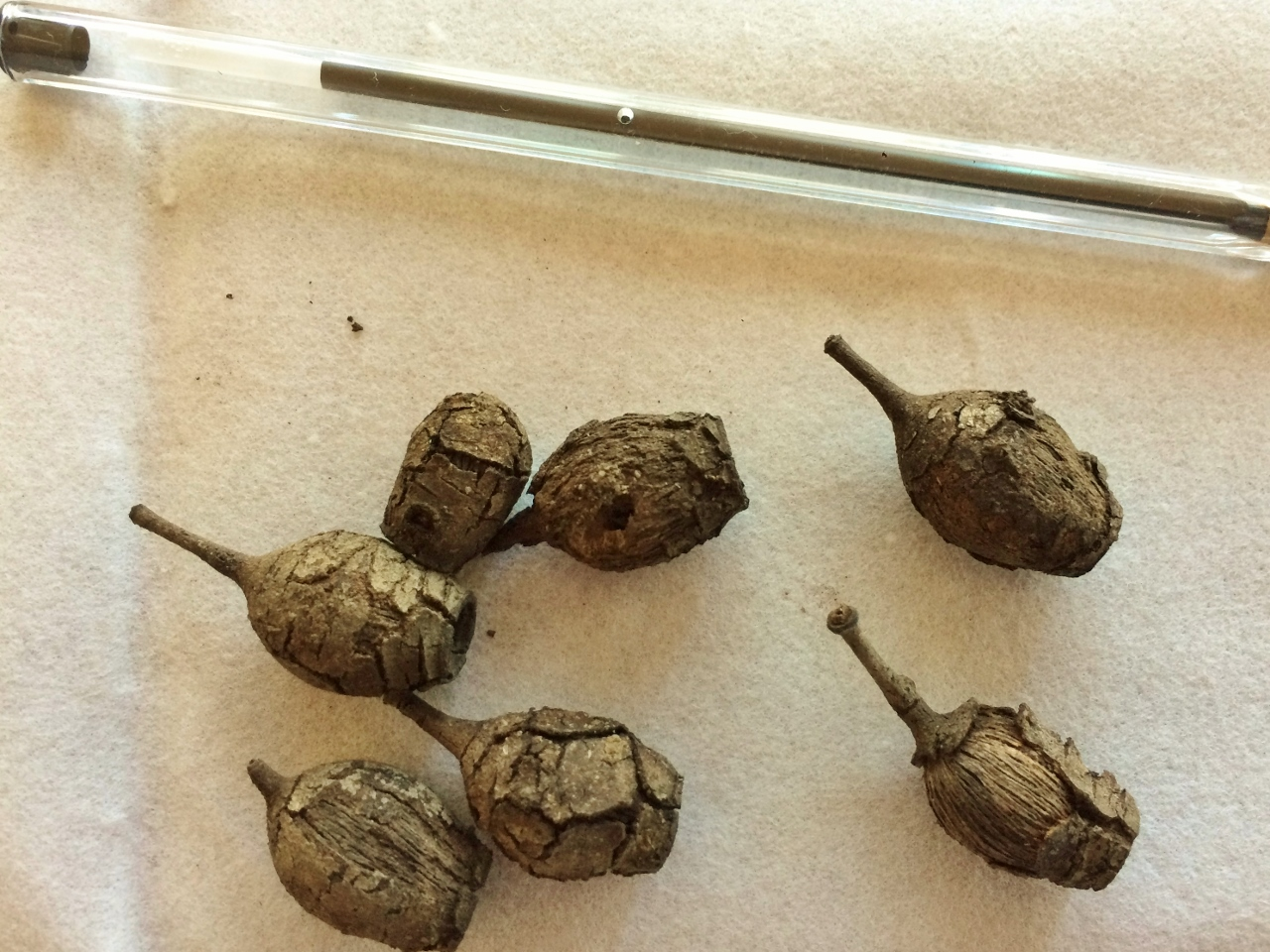
Fruit

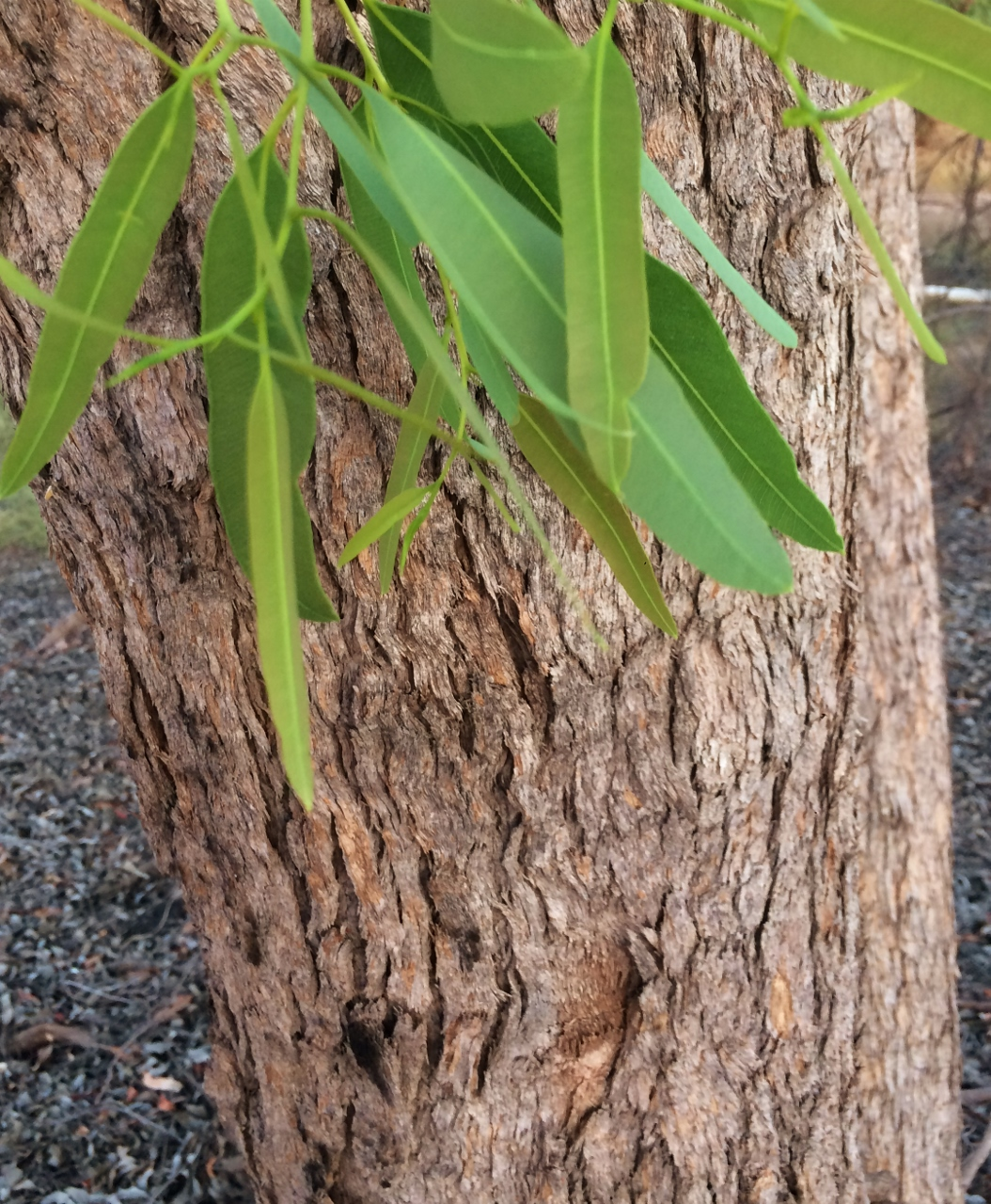
Trunk bark
