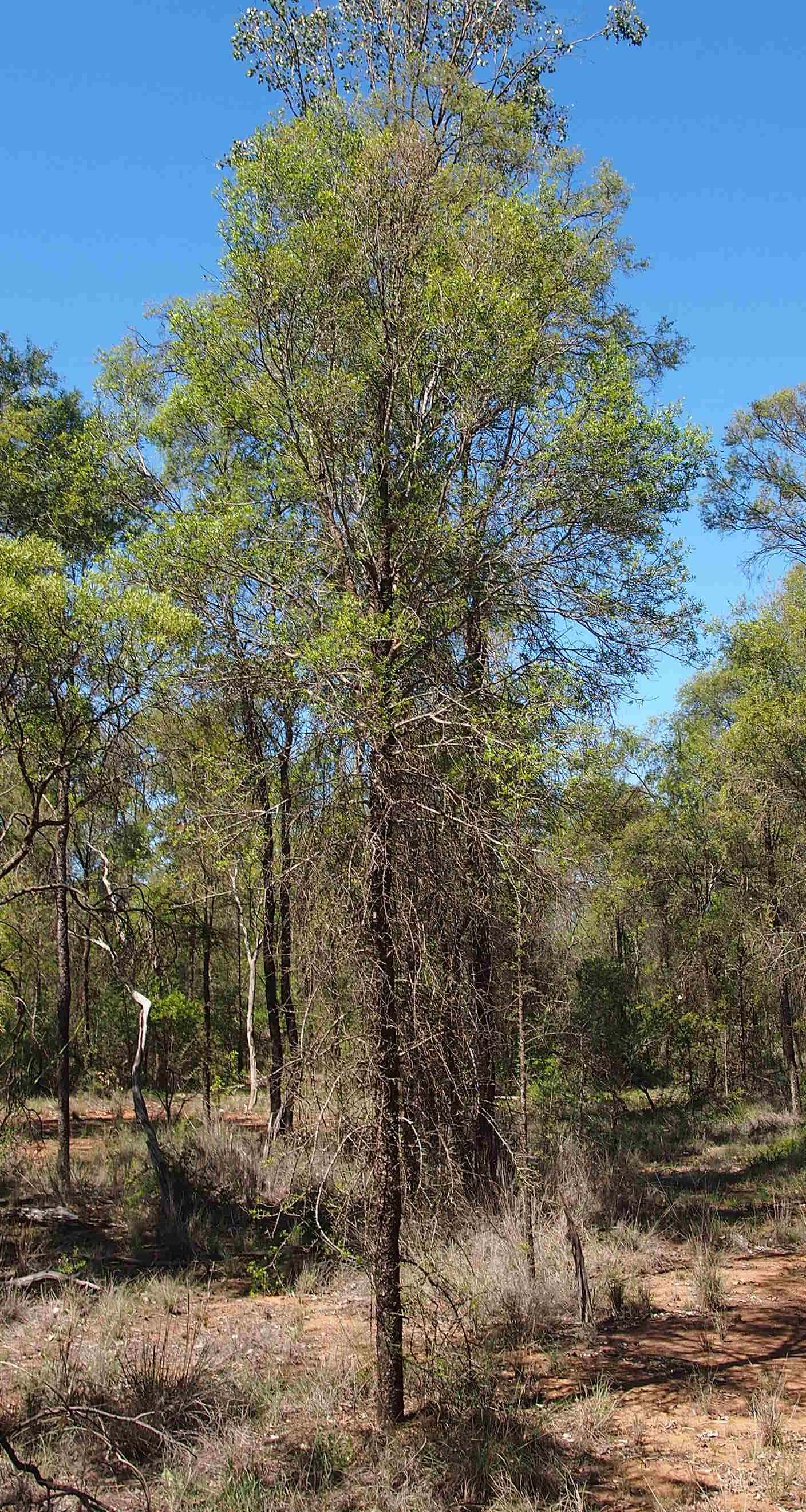
- Habit near Bauhinia

Scientific classification
- Kingdom: Plantae
- Clade: Tracheophytes
- Clade: Angiosperms
- Clade: Eudicots
- Clade: Rosids
- Order: Sapindales
- Family: Rutaceae
- Genus: Flindersia
- Species: F. dissosperma

Binomial name
- Flindersia dissosperma (F.Muell.) Domin

Synonyms
- Flindersia strzeleckiana F.Muell. nom. illeg.; Strzeleckya dissosperma F.Muell.

= Flindersia dissosperma =

Broad-leaved leopard tree

Species of tree

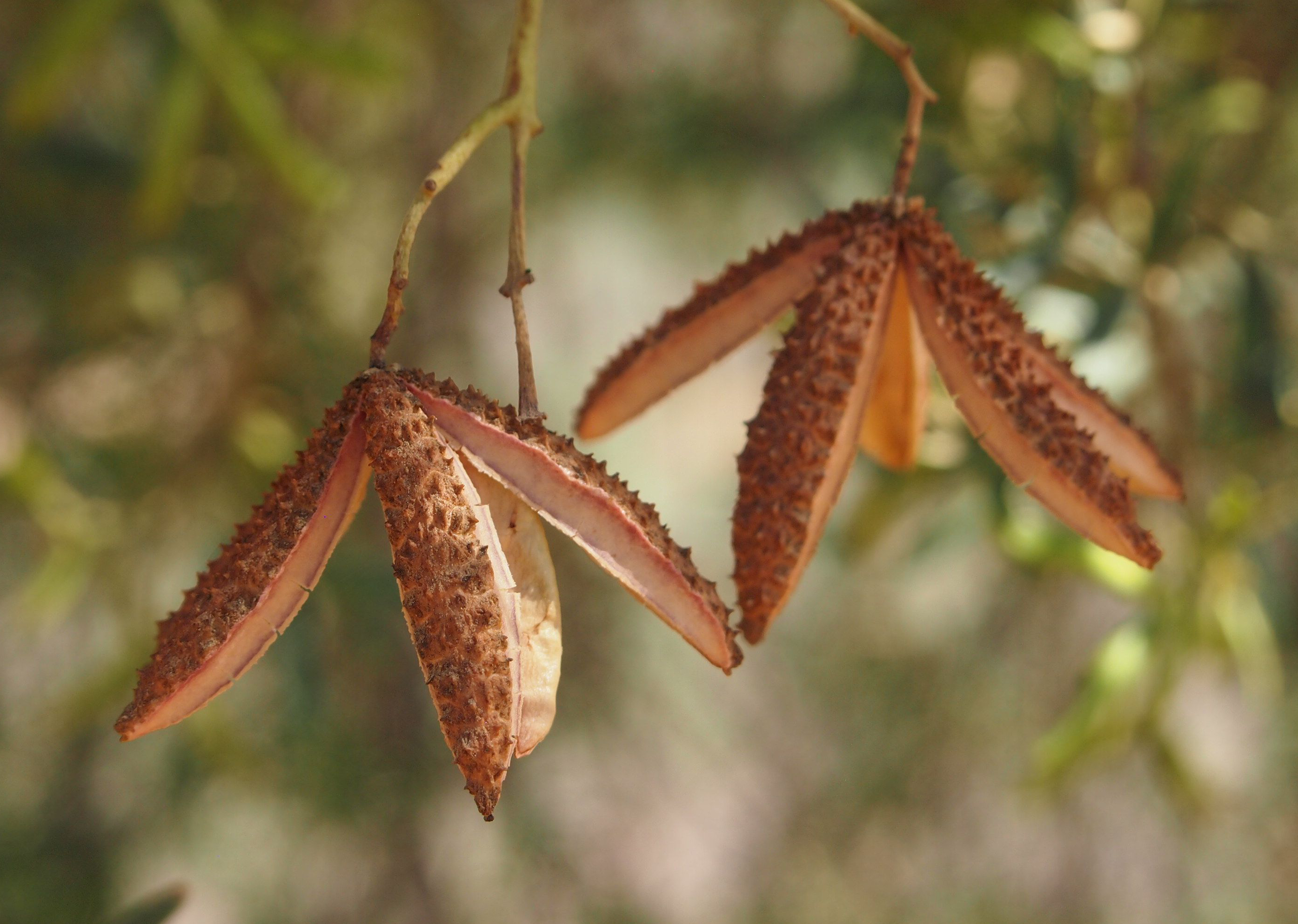
Opened fruit

Flindersia dissosperma, commonly known as scrub leopardwood, is a species of small tree in the family Rutaceae and is endemic to eastern-central Queensland, Australia. It usually has pinnate leaves with between three and five elliptical to egg-shaped leaves, panicles of white to cream-coloured flowers and fruit studded with rough points.

== Description ==
Flindersia dissosperma is a tree that typically grows to a height of 10 m (33 ft). The leaves are arranged in opposite pairs, 15–630 mm (0.59–24.80 in) long, and are usually pinnate with between three and five elliptical to egg-shaped leaflets with the narrower end towards the base. The leaflets are 6–37 mm (0.24–1.46 in) long, 2–8 mm (0.079–0.315 in) wide, the rachis of the leaf winged and the leaflets sessile. The flowers are arranged in panicles 20–90 mm (0.79–3.54 in) long and there are usually at least a few male-only flowers. The sepals are 1–1.5 mm (0.039–0.059 in) long and the petals white to cream-coloured and 3–3.5 mm (0.12–0.14 in) long. Flowering occurs from August to October and the fruit is a woody capsule 20–30 mm (0.79–1.18 in) long containing winged seeds 15–18 mm (0.59–0.71 in) long.

== Taxonomy ==
Scrub leopardwood was first formally described in 1857 by Ferdinand von Mueller who published the description in Hooker's Journal of Botany and Kew Garden Miscellany and gave the plant the name Strzeleckya dissosperma. In 1929, Karel Domin changed the name to Flindersia dissosperma in Bibliotheca Botanica.

== Distribution and habitat ==
Scrub leopardwood mainly grows in dry scrub, often with brigalow (Acacia harpophylla) and poplar box (Eucalyptus populnea). It is found in east-central Queensland from near Charters Towers to near Springsure.

== Conservation status ==
Flindersia dissosperma is classified as of "least concern" under the Queensland Government Nature Conservation Act 1992.
