= Flindersia amboinensis =

Conservation status
- Near Threatened (IUCN 2.3)

Scientific classification
- Kingdom: Plantae
- Clade: Tracheophytes
- Clade: Angiosperms
- Clade: Eudicots
- Clade: Rosids
- Order: Sapindales
- Family: Rutaceae
- Genus: Flindersia
- Species: F. amboinensis

Binomial name
- Flindersia amboinensis Poir.

Species of flowering plant

Flindersia amboinensis is a species of plant in the family Rutaceae. It is found in Indonesia and Papua New Guinea. It is threatened by habitat loss.
