= Daarrba National Park (Cape York Peninsula Aboriginal Land) =

National park in Queensland, Australia

- IUCN category II (national park)
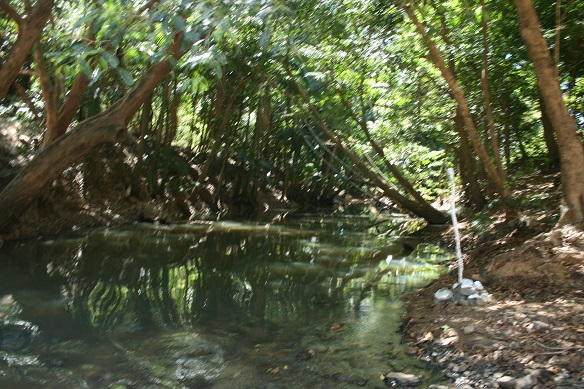

- Location within Queensland
- Location: Queensland
- Nearest city: Cooktown
- Coordinates: 15°04′09″S 145°07′23″E
- Area: 4.17 km^{2} (1.61 sq mi)
- Established: 1973
- Governing body: Queensland Parks and Wildlife Service

Daarrba National Park (Cape York Peninsula Aboriginal Land) is a national park in Queensland, Australia. It is 1,602 km northwest of Brisbane. The national park was previously named Mount Webb National Park until it was renamed on 28 November 2013.

== Vegetation ==
The national park features a number of unique and threatened ecosystems including rare examples of complex rainforest vegetation communities developed upon Basalt soils within the Cape York Peninsula bioregion.

Rainforest communities located within the national park include:

- Deciduous mesophyll/notophyll vine forest growing on alluvial soils.
- Semi-deciduous mesophyll/notophyll vine forest growing on floodplains.
- Semi-deciduous mesophyll/notophyll vine forest growing upon structured red earth soils derived from Basalt.
- Semi-deciduous notophyll/microphyll vine forest growing on structured red earth soils derived from basalt in a shallow valley.
- Semi-deciduous notophyll/microphyll vine forest growing on exposed metamorphic and granitic slopes.

An additional threatened ecosystem located within the national park is a sclerophyll woodland dominated by Eucalyptus leptophleba, Corymbia tessellaris and Corymbia clarksoniana which has developed upon soils formed from basalt flows.

== See also ==
- Protected areas of Queensland
