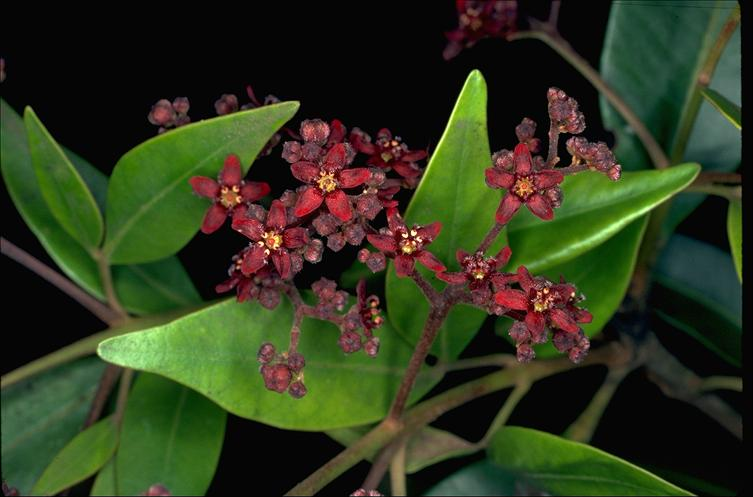
- Near Atherton

Scientific classification
- Kingdom: Plantae
- Clade: Tracheophytes
- Clade: Angiosperms
- Clade: Eudicots
- Clade: Rosids
- Order: Sapindales
- Family: Rutaceae
- Genus: Flindersia
- Species: F. oppositifolia

Binomial name
- Flindersia oppositifolia (F.Muell.) T.G.Hartely & Jessup

Synonyms
- Flindersia pimenteliana f. oppositifolia (F.Muell.) K.D.Scott, W.K.Harris & Playford; Flindersia unifoliolata T.G.Hartley; Hypsophila oppositifolia F.Muell.

= Flindersia oppositifolia =

Mountain silkwood

Species of tree

Flindersia oppositifolia, commonly known as mountain silkwood, is a species of tree that is endemic to the Bellenden Ker Range in northern Queensland. It has simple leaves arranged more or less in opposite pairs, dark reddish flowers arranged in panicles, and fruit studded with short, rough points.

== Description ==
Flindersia oppositifolia is a tree that typically grows to a height of 30 m (98 ft). Its leaves are simple, arranged more or less in opposite pairs, egg-shaped to elliptical, 30–120 mm (1.2–4.7 in) long and 14–32 mm (0.55–1.26 in) wide on a petiole 5–25 mm (0.20–0.98 in) long. The flowers are arranged in panicles 30–90 mm (1.2–3.5 in) long and have five sepals 1–1.5 mm (0.039–0.059 in) long and five dark reddish petals 5–9 mm (0.20–0.35 in) long. Flowering occurs from October to November and the fruit is a woody capsule 75–80 mm (3.0–3.1 in) long studded with short, rough points, and separating into five at maturity, releasing winged seeds 35–40 mm (1.4–1.6 in) long.

== Taxonomy ==
Mountain silkwood was first formally described in 1892 by Ferdinand von Mueller who gave it the name Hypsophila oppositifolia and published the description in The Victorian Naturalist from material collected on Mount Bartle Frere. In 1982, Thomas Hartley and Laurence Jessup changed the name to Flindersia oppositifolia in the journal Brunonia.

== Distribution and habitat ==
Mountain silkwood grows in rainforest at altitudes of 1,300 to 1,500 m (4,300 to 4,900 ft) and is only known from the Bellenden Ker Range in north Queensland.

== Conservation status ==
Flindersia oppositifolia is classified as of "least concern" under the Queensland Government Nature Conservation Act 1992.
