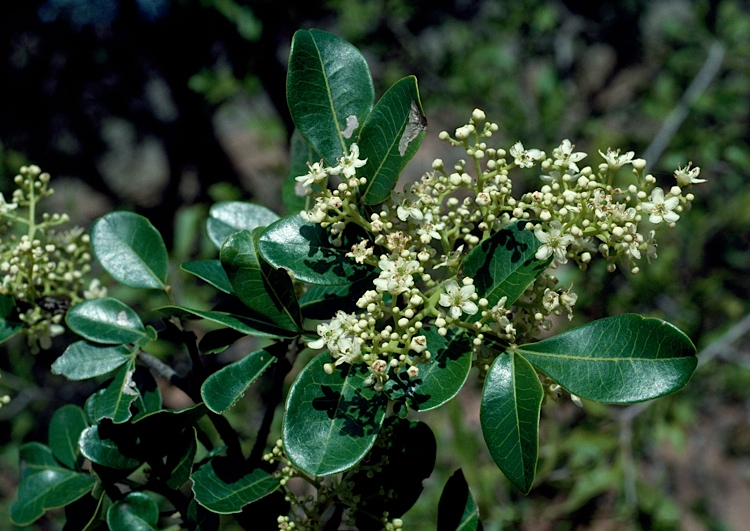
- At Nuga Nuga National Park

Scientific classification
- Kingdom: Plantae
- Clade: Tracheophytes
- Clade: Angiosperms
- Clade: Eudicots
- Clade: Rosids
- Order: Sapindales
- Family: Rutaceae
- Genus: Flindersia
- Species: F. collina

Binomial name
- Flindersia collina F.M.Bailey

Synonyms
- Flindersia strzeleckiana var. latifolia F.M.Bailey

= Flindersia collina =

Broad-leaved leopard tree

Species of tree

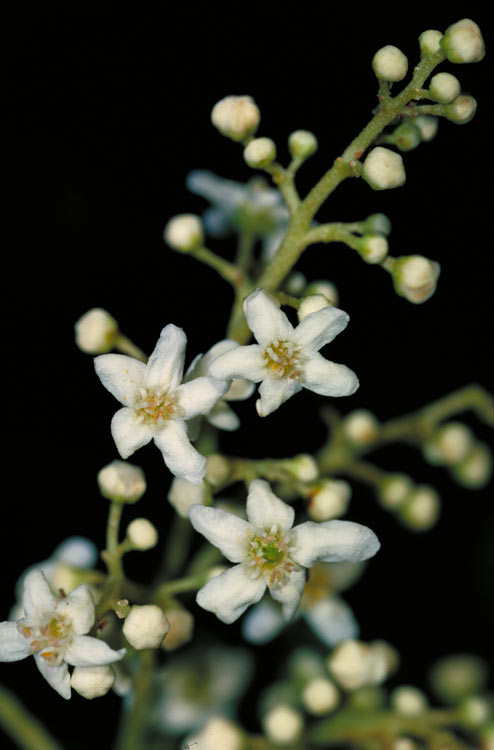
Flower detail

Flindersia collina, commonly known as broad-leaved leopard tree, leopard ash, bastard crow's ash or leatherwood, is a species of tree in the family Rutaceae and is endemic to north-eastern Australia. It usually has pinnate leaves with between three and seven elliptical to spatula-shaped leaves, panicles of white flowers and fruit studded with rough points.

== Description ==
Flindersia collina is a tree that typically grows to a height of 40 m (130 ft). Its bark is shed in oval flakes leaving shallow depressions. The leaves are arranged in more or less opposite pairs and are usually pinnate with between three and seven elliptical to egg-shaped leaflets with the narrower end towards the base. The leaflets are mostly 25–90 mm (0.98–3.54 in) long and 10–47 mm (0.39–1.85 in) wide and sessile. Simple leaves, when present, are a similar shape to the leaflets, 18–45 mm (0.71–1.77 in) long and 10–30 mm (0.39–1.18 in) wide on a petiole 2–15 mm (0.079–0.591 in) long. The flowers are arranged in panicles 30–180 mm (1.2–7.1 in) long and there are usually at least a few male-only flowers. The flowers are about 5–8 mm (0.20–0.31 in) wide, the sepals about 1 mm (0.039 in) long and the petals white and 4–5 mm (0.16–0.20 in) long. Flowering occurs through the year, but mainly in spring and the fruit is a woody capsule 25–50 mm (0.98–1.97 in) long containing winged seeds 14–25 mm (0.55–0.98 in) long.

== Taxonomy ==
Flindersia collina was first formally described in 1898 by Frederick Manson Bailey in the Queensland Agricultural Journal.

== Distribution and habitat ==
Broad-leaved leopard tree grows in rainforest and dry scrub from near sea level to an altitude of 700 m (2,300 ft) and is found between the Rinyirru National Park in far northern Queensland to Toonumbar in far north-eastern New South Wales.

== Conservation status ==
Flindersia collina is classified as of "least concern" under the Queensland Government Nature Conservation Act 1992.
