= Flindersia laevicarpa =

Rose ash

Scientific classification
- Kingdom: Plantae
- Clade: Tracheophytes
- Clade: Angiosperms
- Clade: Eudicots
- Clade: Rosids
- Order: Sapindales
- Family: Rutaceae
- Genus: Flindersia
- Species: F. laevicarpa

Binomial name
- Flindersia laevicarpa C.T.White & W.D.Francis

Species of flowering plant

Flindersia laevicarpa, commonly known in Australia as rose ash, scented maple or dirran maple, is a species of medium-sized to large tree in the family Rutaceae and is native to Papua New Guinea, West Papua and Queensland. It has pinnate leaves with four to eight egg-shaped to elliptical leaflets, panicles of cream-coloured, yellowish, red or purple flowers and smooth woody fruit that split into five at maturity, releasing winged seeds.

== Description ==
Flindersia laevicarpa is a tree that grows to a height of 21–45 m (69–148 ft). It has pinnate leaves 60–300 mm (2.4–11.8 in) long with four to eight egg-shaped leaflets 40–150 mm (1.6–5.9 in) long and 15–65 mm (0.59–2.56 in) wide on petiolules 2–8 mm (0.079–0.315 in) long. The flowers are arranged in panicles 120–300 mm (4.7–11.8 in) long, the sepals about 1 mm (0.039 in) long and the petals cream-coloured, yellowish, red or purple and 2–2.5 mm (0.079–0.098 in) long. Flowering occurs from January to July and the fruit is a smooth, woody capsule 29–52 mm (1.1–2.0 in) long that splits into five, releasing seeds that are 29–52 mm (1.1–2.0 in) long.

== Taxonomy ==
Flindersia laevicarpa was first formally described in 1920 by Cyril Tenison White and William Douglas Francis in the Botany Bulletin of the Queensland Department of Agriculture.

In 1969, Thomas Hartley described two varieties and the name of the autonym is accepted by the Australian Plant Census:

- Flindersia laevicarpa var. heterophylla (originally described as Flindersia heterophylla by Merrill and Perry) has leaves usually shorter than 120 mm (4.7 in), usually with two to four leaflets and a capsule 30–52 mm (1.2–2.0 in) long;
- Flindersia laevicarpa var. laevicarpa has leaves 120–300 mm (4.7–11.8 in), usually with four to eight leaflets and a capsule 29–40 mm (1.1–1.6 in) long.

== Distribution and habitat ==
Variety laevicarpa grows in rainforest at altitudes of between 150 and 830 m (490 and 2,720 ft) and occurs from near the Daintree River to Gadgarra in far north Queensland. Variety heterophylla is found from sea level to an altitude of about 1,000 m (3,300 ft) between Misool Island in West Papua to Milne Bay in Papua New Guinea.
