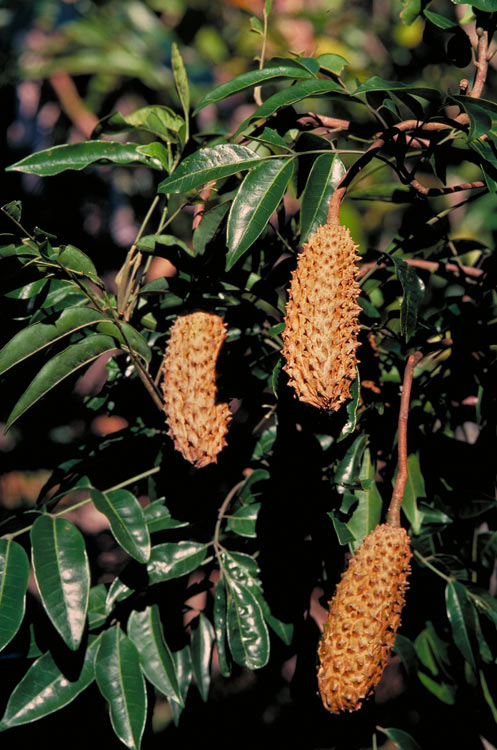

Scientific classification
- Kingdom: Plantae
- Clade: Tracheophytes
- Clade: Angiosperms
- Clade: Eudicots
- Clade: Rosids
- Order: Sapindales
- Family: Rutaceae
- Genus: Flindersia
- Species: F. acuminata

Binomial name
- Flindersia acuminata C.T.White

= Flindersia acuminata =

Silver silkwood

Species of tree

Flindersia acuminata, commonly known as silver silkwood, icewood, Putt's pine, Paddy King's beech or silver maple, is a species of tree that has pinnate leaves with between six and ten egg-shaped to elliptic leaflets, creamy yellow flowers arranged in panicles, and fruit studded with short, rough points.

== Description ==
Flindersia acuminata is a tree that typically grows to a height of 33 m (108 ft) and usually has pale brown bark and with its young shoots covered with small star-shaped hairs. Its leaves are pinnate, arranged alternately with between six and ten egg-shaped to elliptical leaflets mostly 50–250 mm (2.0–9.8 in) long and 13–48 mm (0.51–1.89 in) wide on petiolules 10–31 mm (0.39–1.22 in) long. The flowers are arranged in panicles 70–230 mm (2.8–9.1 in) long. The flowers have five sepals about 2 mm (0.079 in) long and five creamy yellow petals about 3 mm (0.12 in) long. Flowering occurs from November to January and the fruit is a woody capsule 90–120 mm (3.5–4.7 in) long studded with short, rough points, and separating into five at maturity, each section containing three winged seeds.

== Taxonomy ==
Flindersia acuminata was first formally described in 1919 by Cyril Tenison White in the Botany Bulletin of the Queensland Department of Agriculture.

== Distribution and habitat ==
Silver silkwood grows in rainforest at altitudes of 200 to 1,000 m (660 to 3,280 ft) from near Kuranda to Mission Beach in far north Queensland.

== Conservation status ==
Flindersia acuminata is classified as of "least concern" under the Queensland Government Nature Conservation Act 1992.
