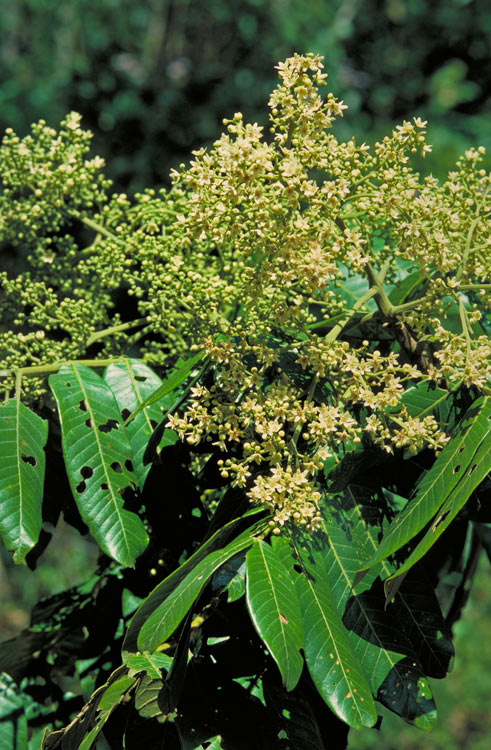

Conservation status
- Least Concern (NCA)

Scientific classification
- Kingdom: Plantae
- Clade: Tracheophytes
- Clade: Angiosperms
- Clade: Eudicots
- Clade: Rosids
- Order: Sapindales
- Family: Rutaceae
- Genus: Flindersia
- Species: F. schottiana

Binomial name
- Flindersia schottiana F.Muell.

Synonyms
- Flindersia pubescens F.M.Bailey; Flindersia schottiana var. pubescens F.Muell.; Flindersia schottiana F.Muell. var. schottiana

= Flindersia schottiana =

Bumpy ash

Species of flowering plant

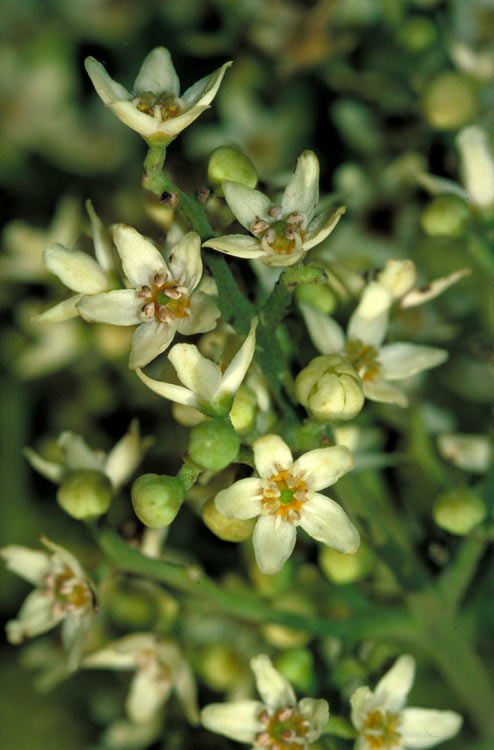
Flower detail

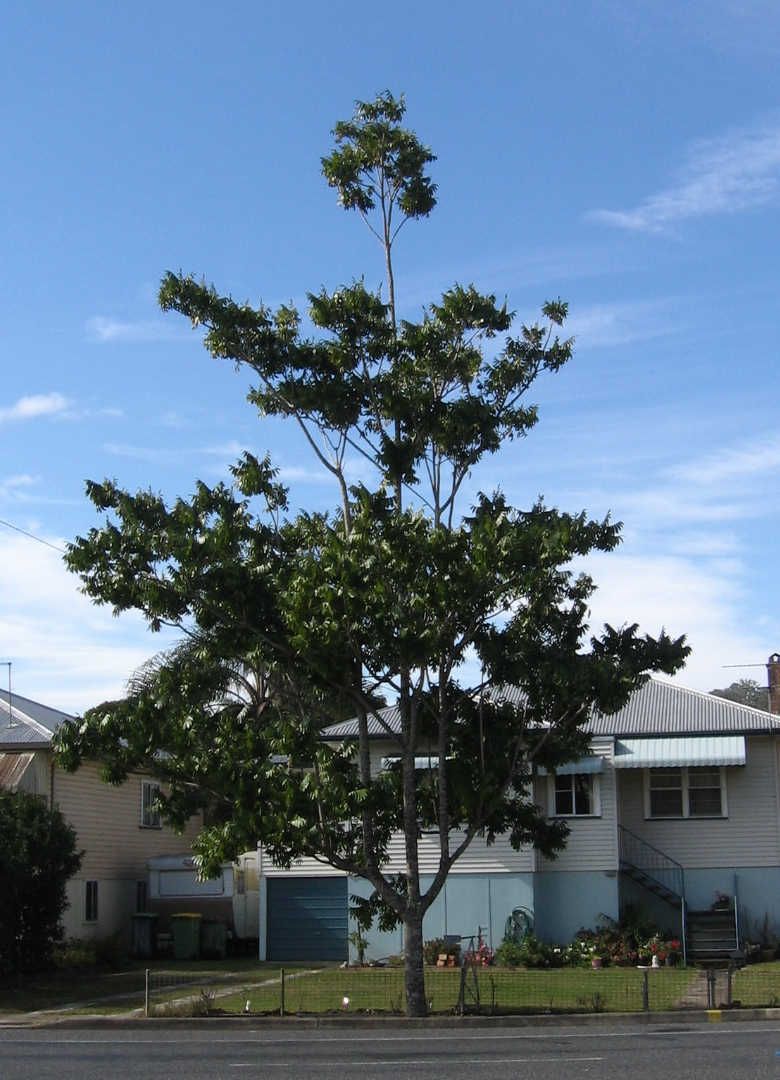
Habit as a street tree

Flindersia schottiana, commonly known as bumpy ash, cudgerie or silver ash, is a species of rainforest tree in the family Rutaceae and is native to New Guinea and eastern Australia. It has pinnate leaves with mostly ten to sixteen leaflets, panicles of white flowers and woody fruit studded with rough points.

== Description ==
Flindersia schottiana is a tree that typically grows to a height of 36 m (118 ft). Its leaves are pinnate, arranged in opposite pairs, 190–400 mm (7.5–15.7 in) long with mostly ten to sixteen narrow egg-shaped to narrow elliptical leaflets that are 70–160 mm (2.8–6.3 in) long and 15–45 mm (0.59–1.77 in) wide. The side leaflets are more or less sessile, the end leaflet on a petiolule 11–27 mm (0.43–1.06 in) long. The flowers are arranged in panicles 200–270 mm (7.9–10.6 in) long and have five sepals 1–1.5 mm (0.039–0.059 in) long and five white petals 4–6 mm (0.16–0.24 in) long. Flowering occurs from August to December and the fruit is a woody capsule 80–130 mm (3.1–5.1 in) long, studded on the surface with rough points and separating at maturity into five valves to release winged seeds 50–60 mm (2.0–2.4 in) long.

== Taxonomy ==
Flindersia schottiana was first formally described in 1862 by Ferdinand von Mueller in Fragmenta phytographiae Australiae from specimens collected near the Hastings River in New South Wales. The specific epithet (schottiana) honours Mueller's friend Heinrich Wilhelm Schott.

== Distribution and habitat ==
Bumpy ash grows in rainforest from sea level to an altitude of 800 m (2,600 ft) and occurs in New Guinea and from the Claudie River in the Kutini-Payamu National Park in far north Queensland to the Hastings River in New South Wales.

== Conservation status ==
Flindersia schottiana is classified as of "least concern" under the Queensland Government Nature Conservation Act 1992.
