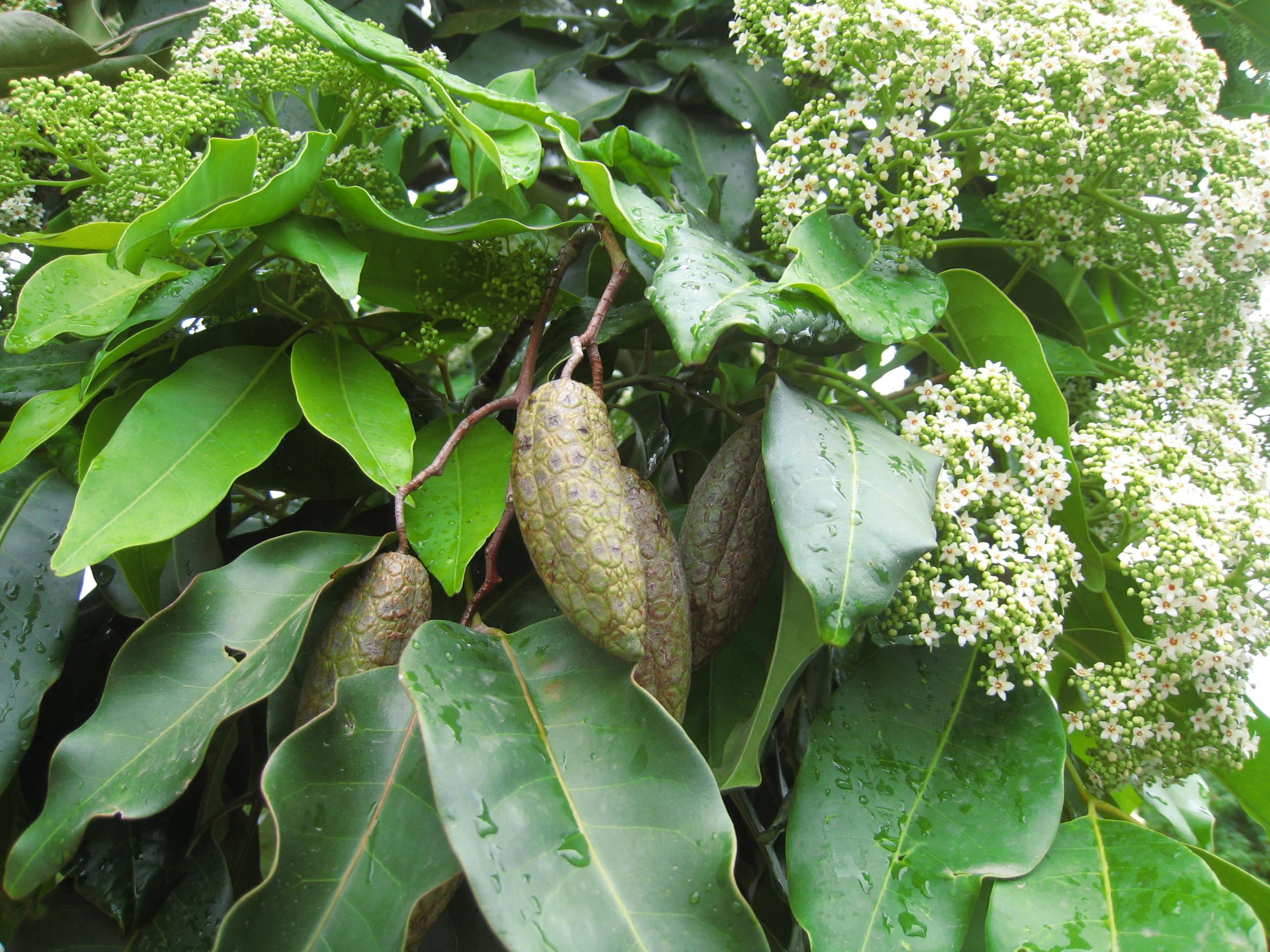
- Flindersia brayleyana in Brisbane

Scientific classification
- Kingdom: Plantae
- Clade: Tracheophytes
- Clade: Angiosperms
- Clade: Eudicots
- Clade: Rosids
- Order: Sapindales
- Family: Rutaceae
- Subfamily: Zanthoxyloideae
- Genus: Flindersia; R.Br.

Type species
- Flindersia australis R.Br.

Species
- See text

Synonyms
- Oxleya Hook.; Strzeleckia Benth. orth. var.; Strzeleckya F.Muell.

= Flindersia =

Genus of flowering plants

Flindersia is a genus of 17 species of small to large trees in the family Rutaceae. They have simple or pinnate leaves, flowers arranged in panicles at or near the ends of branchlets and fruit that is a woody capsule containing winged seeds. They grow naturally in Australia, the Moluccas, New Guinea and New Caledonia.

== Description ==
Trees in the genus Flindersia have simple or pinnate leaves with up to sixteen leaflets, the side leaflets arranged in opposite pairs. The flowers are arranged in panicles at the ends of branchlets or in upper leaf axils and have five sepals and five petals. The flowers are bisexual, or sometimes only have stamens. There are five stamens opposite the sepals, alternating with five staminodes. The ovary has five locules and is more or less spherical with five shallow lobes and there are between four and six ovules in each locule. The fruit is a woody capsule splitting into five and contains brown, winged seeds.

== Taxonomy ==
The genus Flindersia was first formally described in 1814 by Robert Brown in Matthew Flinders' sea voyage journal A Voyage to Terra Australis.

=== Species list ===
As of April 2025, Plants of the World Online accepts the following 17 species:

- Flindersia acuminata C.T.White – silver silkwood, silver maple (Qld.)
- Flindersia amboinensis Poir. – (Moluccas to New Guinea)
- Flindersia australis R.Br. – Australian teak, crows ash (Qld., N.S.W.)
- Flindersia bennettii F.Muell. ex C.Moore – Bennett's ash (Qld., N.S.W.)
- Flindersia bourjotiana F.Muell. – Queensland silver ash (Qld.)
- Flindersia brassii T.G.Hartley & B.Hyland – hard scented maple, Claudie River scented maple – (Qld.)
- Flindersia brayleyana F.Muell. – Queensland maple, maple silkwood (Qld.)
- Flindersia collina F.M.Bailey – broad-leaved leopard tree (Qld., N.S.W.)
- Flindersia dissosperma (F.Muell.) Domin – scrub leopardwood (Qld.)
- Flindersia fournieri Pancher & Sebert – (New Caledonia)
- Flindersia ifflana F.Muell. – hickory ash, Cairns hickory (Qld.)
- Flindersia laevicarpa C.T.White & W.D.Francis
- Flindersia maculosa (Lindl.) Benth. – leopardwood, leopard tree (Qld., N.S.W.)
- Flindersia oppositifolia (F.Muell.) T.G.Hartley & Laurence W. Jessup – mountain silkwood (Qld.)
- Flindersia pimenteliana F.Muell. – maple silkwood, rose silkwood (New Guinea, Qld.)
- Flindersia schottiana F.Muell. – silver ash, cudgerie, bumpy ash (New Guinea, Qld., N.S.W.)
- Flindersia xanthoxyla (A.Cunn. ex Hook.) Domin – yellowwood, long jack (Qld., N.S.W.)

== Distribution and habitat ==
Many species of Flindersia grow in rainforest. Of the seventeen species, fifteen occur in Australia, twelve of which are endemic.

== Uses ==
Some species yield timbers that are widely used for flooring and cabinet work.

== Gallery ==
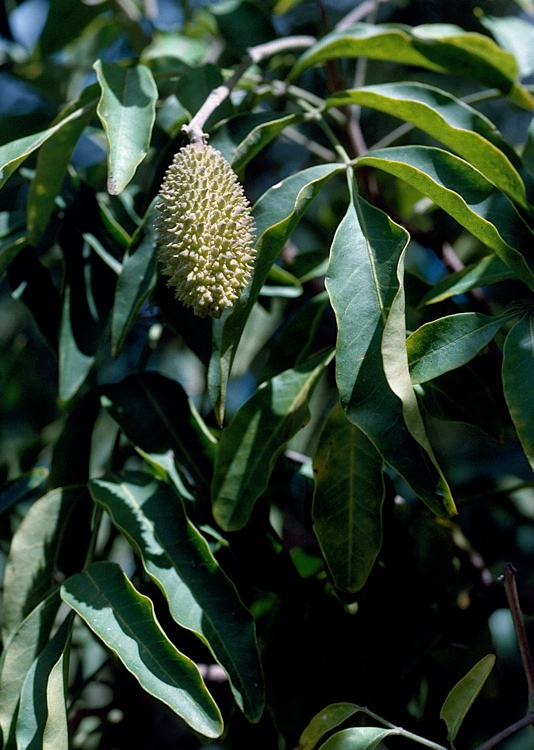
Capsule of F. xanthoxyla

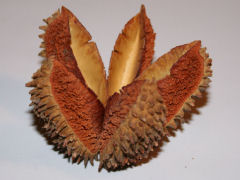
Fruit capsule of F. australis

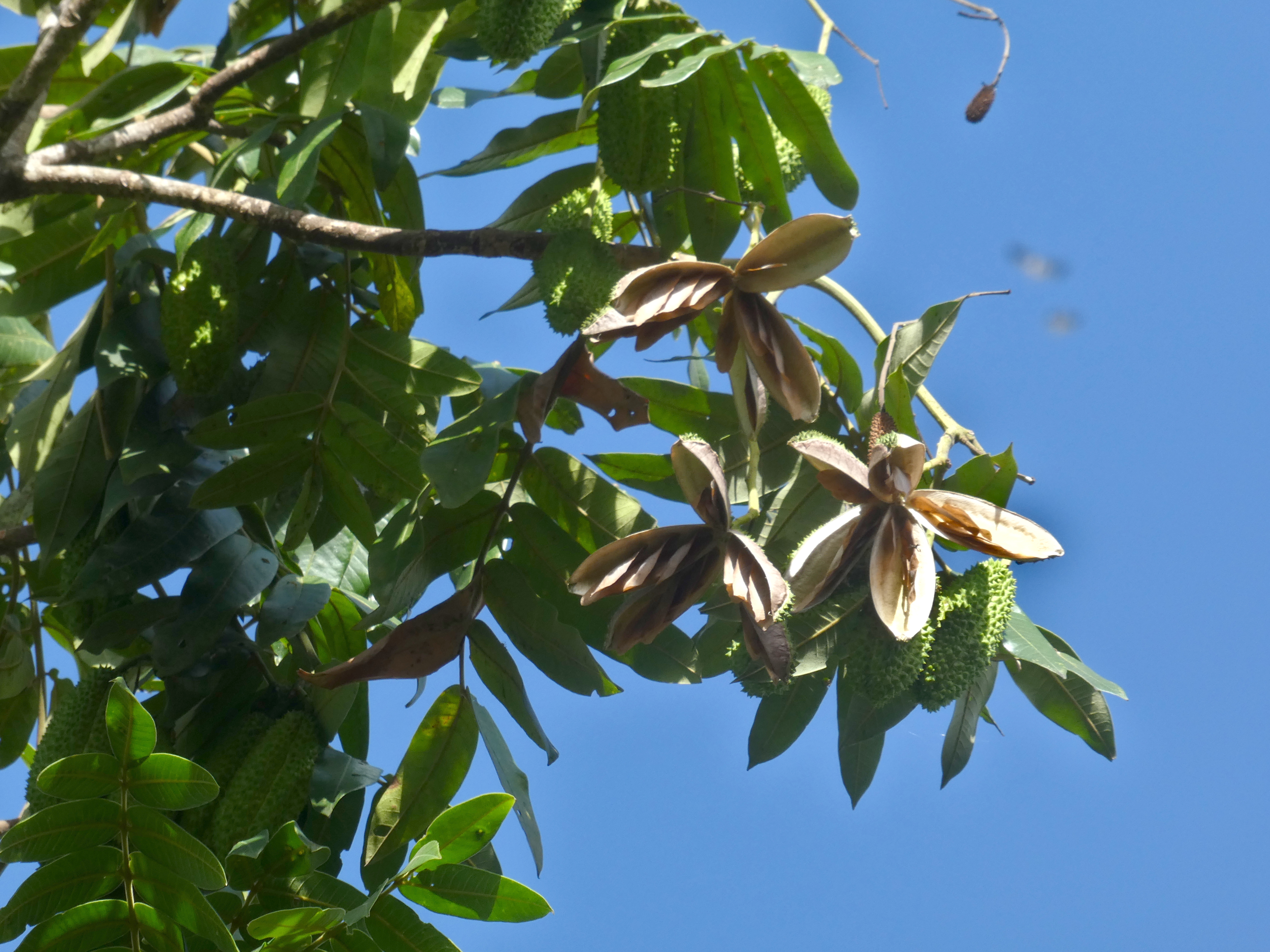
Ripening fruit of F. schottiana

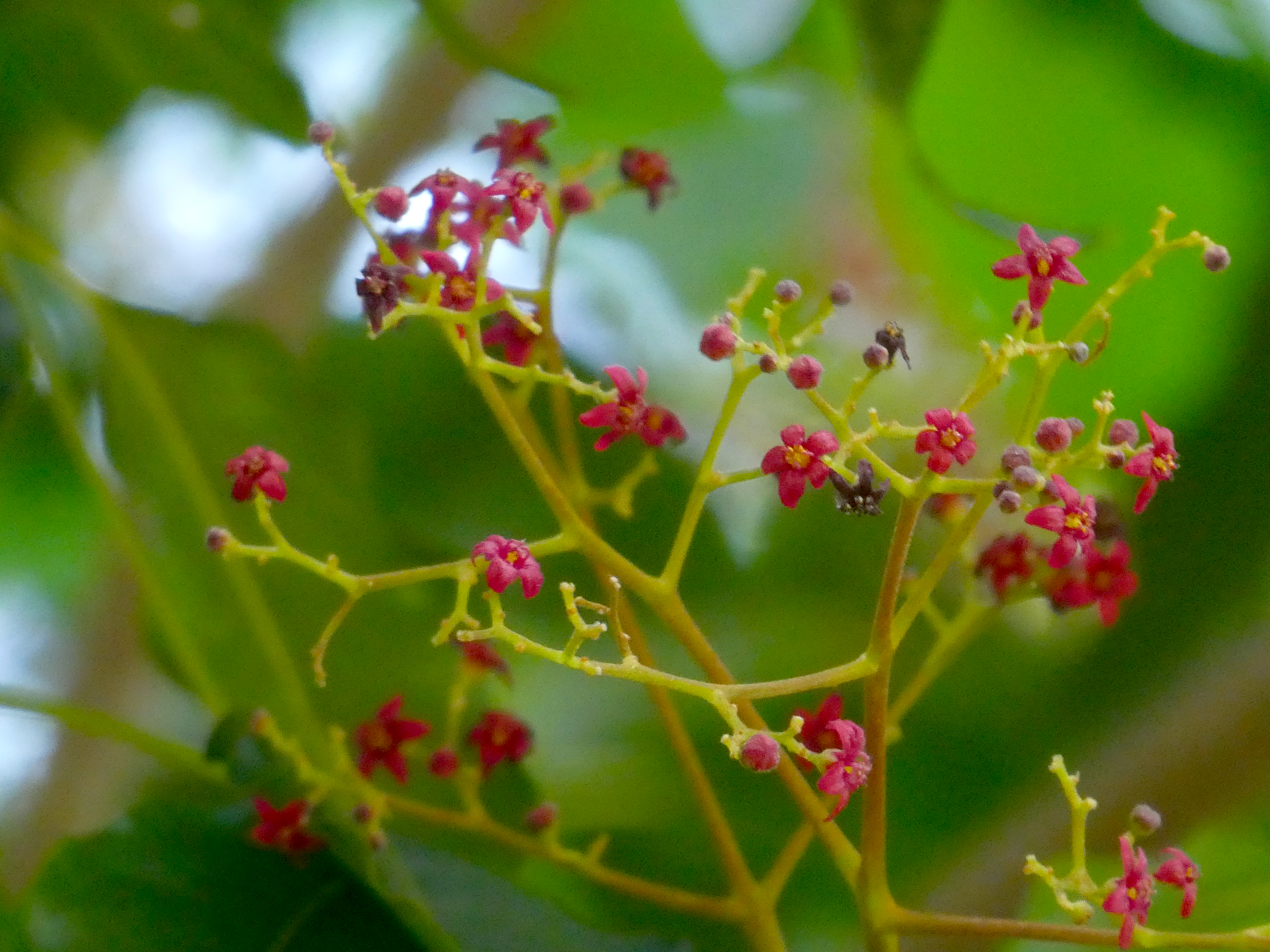
Flowers of F. pimenteliana
