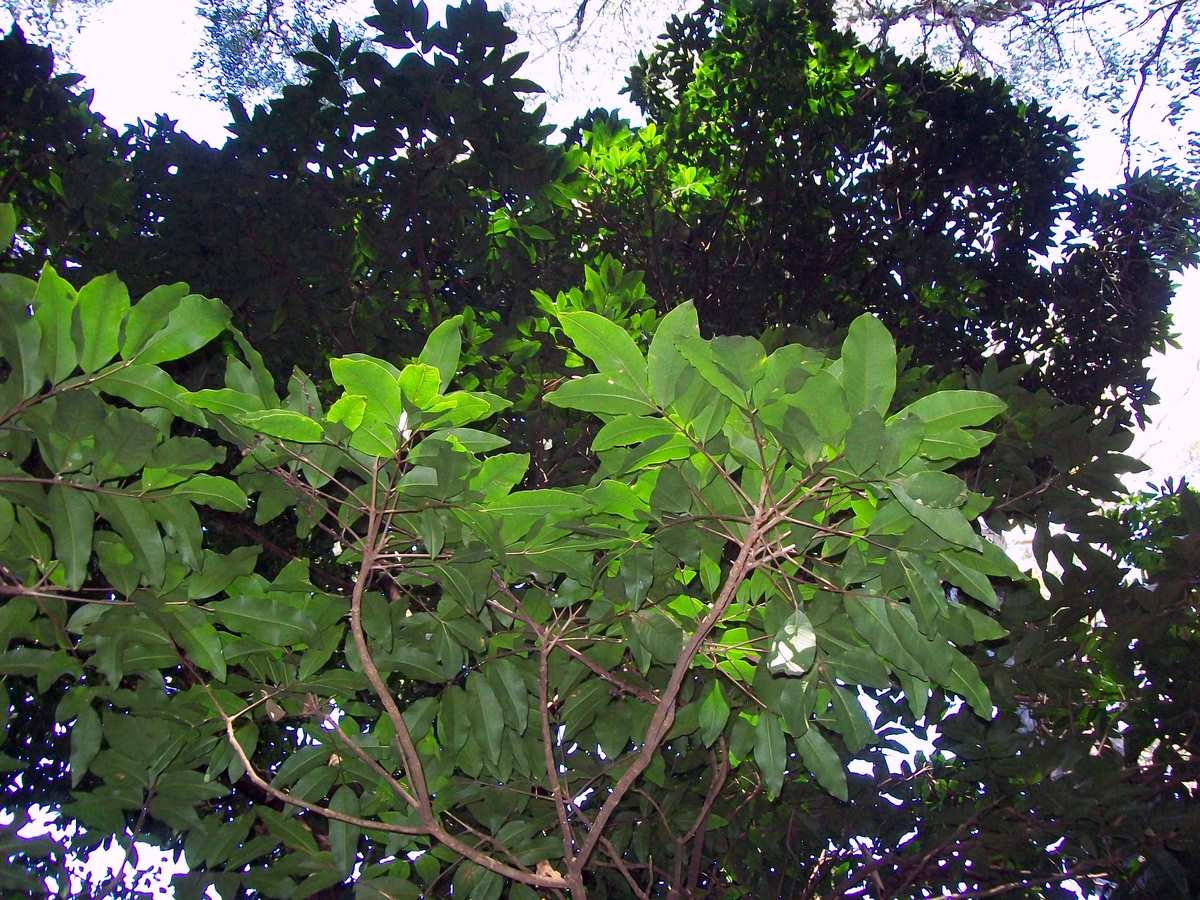

Scientific classification
- Kingdom: Plantae
- Clade: Tracheophytes
- Clade: Angiosperms
- Clade: Eudicots
- Clade: Rosids
- Order: Sapindales
- Family: Rutaceae
- Genus: Flindersia
- Species: F. bennettii

Binomial name
- Flindersia bennettii (F.Muell.) ex C.Moore

Synonyms
- Flindersia bennetiana Benth. orth. var.; Flindersia bennettiana F.Muell. ex Benth.; Flindersia leichardtii C.DC.

= Flindersia bennettii =

Bennett's ash

Species of tree

Flindersia bennettii, commonly known as Bennett's ash, is a species of tree in the family Rutaceae and is endemic to north-eastern Australia. It has pinnate leaves with between three and nine leaflets, cream-coloured flowers arranged on the ends of branchlets and woody fruit containing winged seeds.

== Description ==
Flindersia bennettii is a tree that typically grows to a height of 43 m (141 ft). Its leaves are arranged in opposite pairs and usually pinnate with between three and nine elliptical to egg-shaped leaflets that are 60–190 mm (2.4–7.5 in) long and 17–80 mm (0.67–3.15 in) wide. The leaflets are glossy dark green on the upper surface and paler below, the side leaflets on petiolules 1–6 mm (0.039–0.236 in) long, the end leaflet on a petiolule 8–30 mm (0.31–1.18 in) long. The flowers are arranged in panicles on the ends of branchlets, sometimes in upper leaf axils, and are up to 250 mm (9.8 in) long. The sepals are 1–1.5 mm (0.039–0.059 in) long and the petals are cream-coloured to white, 2.5–5 mm (0.098–0.197 in) long with a few hairs on the back. Flowering occurs from May to October and the fruit is a capsule 4–7 mm (0.16–0.28 in) long and studded with rough points up to 4 mm (0.16 in) long. The seeds are 30–45 mm (1.2–1.8 in) long and winged at both ends.

== Taxonomy ==
Flindersia bennettii was first formally described in 1861 by Charles Moore from an unpublished description by Ferdinand von Mueller, and the description was published in Catalogue of the Natural and Industrial Products of New South Wales, exhibited in the School of Arts by the International Exhibition Commissioners.

== Distribution and habitat ==
Bennett's ash mainly grows in streamside, seaside or subtropical rainforest from sea level to an altitude of 300 m (980 ft) and occurs from the Clarence River in New South Wales to Bundaberg in south eastern Queensland.

== Conservation status ==
Flindersia bennettii is classified as of "least concern" under the Queensland Government Nature Conservation Act 1992.

== Uses ==
The timber of Bennett's ash is straight grained and easily worked. It was previously used for timber in the construction of coaches, boat building, cabinet and joinery work. It is an excellent carving wood. The weight is between 800 and 850 kilograms per cubic metre.
