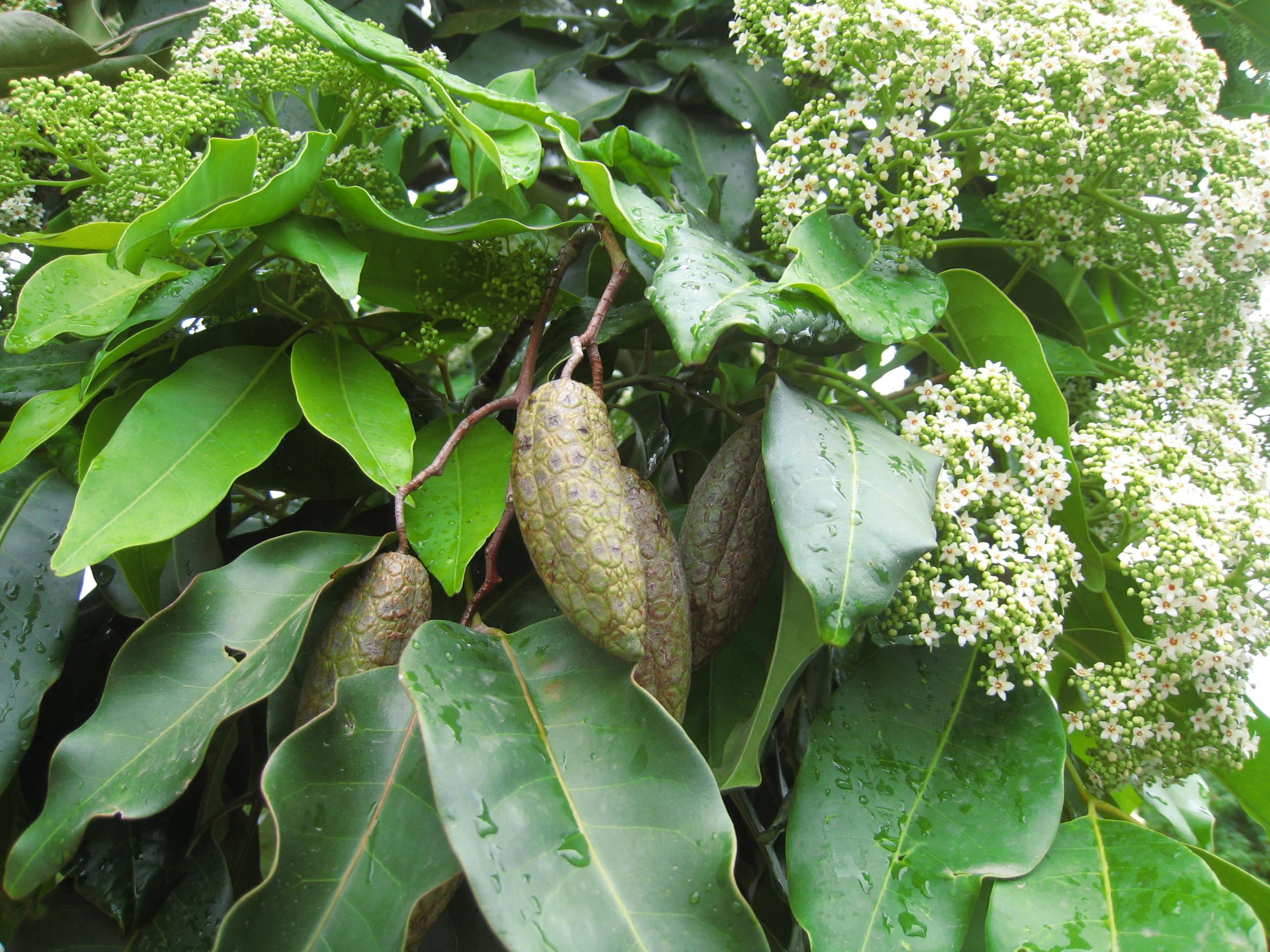

Scientific classification
- Kingdom: Plantae
- Clade: Tracheophytes
- Clade: Angiosperms
- Clade: Eudicots
- Clade: Rosids
- Order: Sapindales
- Family: Rutaceae
- Genus: Flindersia
- Species: F. brayleyana

Binomial name
- Flindersia brayleyana F.Muell.

Synonyms
- Flindersia brayleana W.E.Cooper orth. var.; Flindersia chatawaiana F.M.Bailey orth. var.; Flindersia chatawayana F.M.Bailey

= Flindersia brayleyana =

Queensland maple

Species of tree

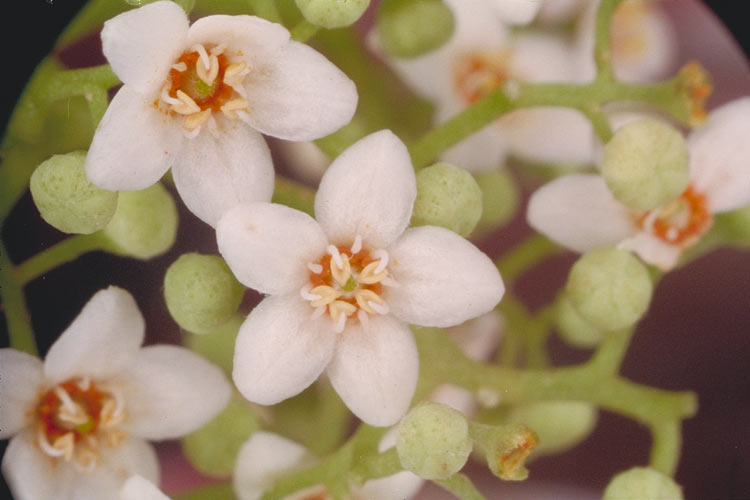
Flower detail

Flindersia brayleyana, commonly known as Queensland maple, maple silkwood or red beech, is a species of tree in the family Rutaceae and is endemic to northern Queensland. It has pinnate leaves with between six and ten leaflets, panicles of white or cream-coloured flowers and smooth fruit that opens in five sections to release winged seeds.

== Description ==
Flindersia brayleyana is a tree that typically grows to a height of 35 m (115 ft). It has pinnate leaves arranged in more or less opposite pairs with between six and ten egg-shaped to elliptical leaflets that are 80–185 mm (3.1–7.3 in) long and 30–80 mm (1.2–3.1 in) wide on petiolules 10–25 mm (0.39–0.98 in) long. The leaves have many conspicuous oil dots. The flowers are arranged in panicles 120–230 mm (4.7–9.1 in) long, the sepals about 0.5 mm (0.020 in) long and the petals white or cream-coloured, 2.5–3.5 mm (0.098–0.138 in) long. The fruit is a smooth, woody capsule 60–100 mm (2.4–3.9 in) long that splits into five at maturity, releasing seeds 45–60 mm (1.8–2.4 in) long.

== Taxonomy ==
Flindersia brayleyana was first formally described in 1866 by Ferdinand von Mueller in Fragmenta phytographiae Australiae from specimens collected near the Herbert River by John Dallachy. The specific epithet (brayleyana) honours Edward William Brayley.

== Distribution and habitat ==
Queensland maple grows in rainforest at altitudes between 30 and 1,100 m (98 and 3,609 ft) between the Daintree River and Rockingham Bay.

== Conservation status ==
Flindersia brayleyana is classified as of "least concern" under the Queensland Government Nature Conservation Act 1992.

== Uses ==
Queensland maple produces a good quality, decorative cabinet timber and has been used in the manufacture of propellers and plywood in Mosquito bomber aircraft and in acoustic guitars. However most specimens are protected in World Heritage areas, the timber is now in very short supply, and attempts to grow the tree in plantations have failed. Its heartwood is pink to brownish pink whilst the narrow sapwood band is white to pale grey. The timber provides very high chatoyance (iridescence or lustre), with an average value above 23 PZC.
