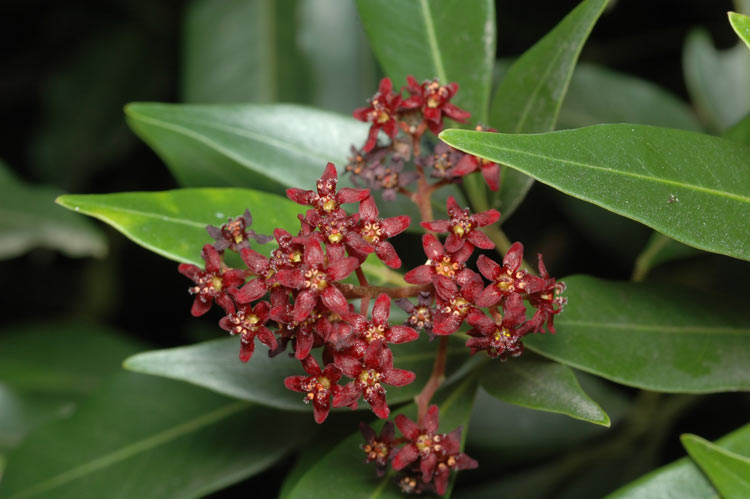

Scientific classification
- Kingdom: Plantae
- Clade: Tracheophytes
- Clade: Angiosperms
- Clade: Eudicots
- Clade: Rosids
- Order: Sapindales
- Family: Rutaceae
- Genus: Flindersia
- Species: F. pimenteliana

Binomial name
- Flindersia pimenteliana F.Muell

Synonyms
- Flindersia mazlini F.M.Bailey; Flindersia pimenteliana F.Muell. f. pimenteliana

= Flindersia pimenteliana =

Maple silkwood

Species of flowering plant

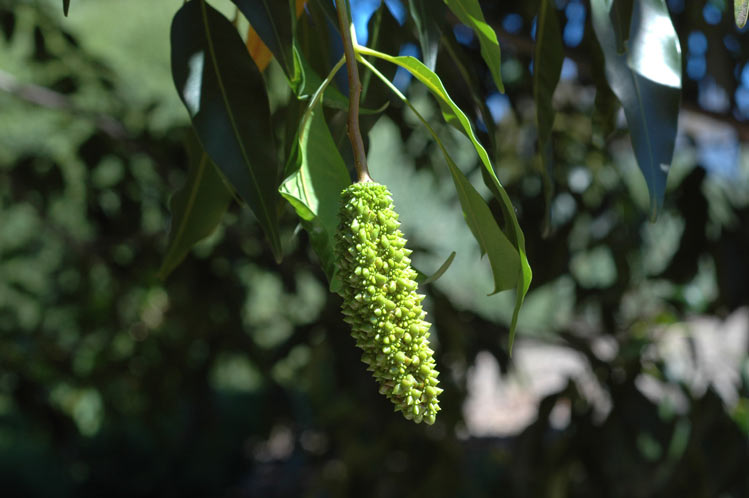
Immature fruit

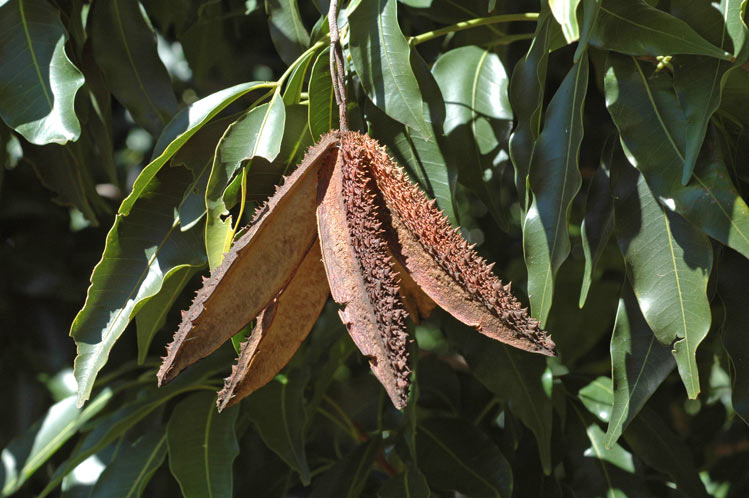
Opened fruit

Flindersia pimenteliana, commonly known as maple silkwood, red beech or rose silkwood, is a species of tree in the family Rutaceae and is native to New Guinea and Queensland. It has pinnate leaves with three to seven egg-shaped to elliptic leaflets, panicles of red or reddish flowers and fruit studded with rough points.

== Description ==
Flindersia pimenteliana is a tree that typically grows to a height of 36 m (118 ft). It has pinnate leaves 70–250 mm (2.8–9.8 in) long arranged in more or less opposite pairs with three to seven, egg-shaped to elliptic leaflets 35–120 mm (1.4–4.7 in) long and 13–50 mm (0.51–1.97 in) wide. The side leaflets are on a petiolule 3–15 mm (0.12–0.59 in) long and the end leaflet on a petiolule 12–40 mm (0.47–1.57 in) long. The flowers are arranged in panicles 90–170 mm (3.5–6.7 in) long, the five sepals about 1 mm (0.039 in) long and the five petals red or reddish and 2.5–4 mm (0.098–0.157 in) long. Flowering occurs from November to February and the fruit is a woody capsule 60–90 mm (2.4–3.5 in) long and studded with rough points up to 4 mm (0.16 in) long. The fruit opens into five valves, releasing winged seeds 40–60 mm (1.6–2.4 in) long.

== Taxonomy ==
Flindersia pimenteliana was first formally described in 1875 by Ferdinand von Mueller in Fragmenta phytographiae Australiae from specimens collected near Rockingham Bay by John Dallachy.

== Distribution and habitat ==
Maple silkwood grows in rainforest in Australia and New Guinea. In Australia in grows at altitudes from 20 to 1,250 m (66 to 4,101 ft) and is found from Mount Finnigan in Ngalba Bulal (Cedar Bay) National Park) south to Paluma Range National Park near Townsville.

== Uses ==
Good quality, decorative cabinet timber has been produced by this tree but because it is mostly only found in reserves, the timber is in very short supply. Attempts to grow this species in plantations have failed.

== Chemical constituents ==
F. pimenteliana contains tryptamine alkaloids known as pimentelamines. They are adducts of ascorbic acid. The plant also contains 2-isoprenyl-N,N-dimethyltryptamine, another tryptamine alkaloid, as well as 4-methylborreverine, borreverine, dimethylisoborreverine, quercitrin, and carpachromene.
