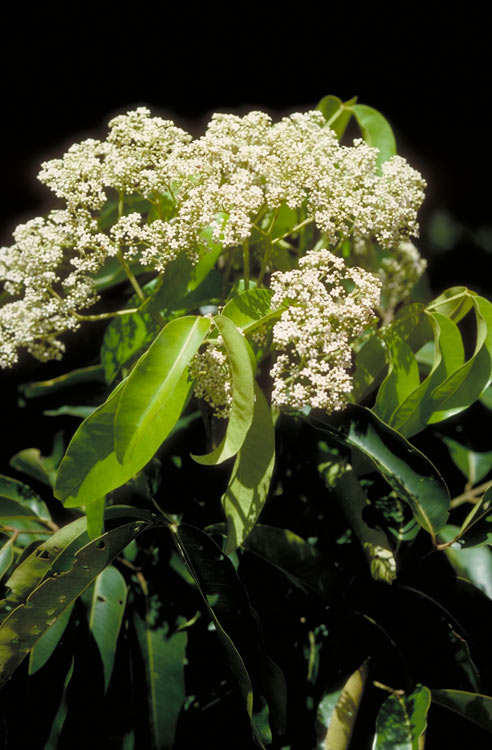

Scientific classification
- Kingdom: Plantae
- Clade: Tracheophytes
- Clade: Angiosperms
- Clade: Eudicots
- Clade: Rosids
- Order: Sapindales
- Family: Rutaceae
- Genus: Flindersia
- Species: F. ifflana

Binomial name
- Flindersia ifflana F.Muell.

Synonyms
- Flindersia ifflaiana F.Muell. orth. var.

= Flindersia ifflana =

Hickory ash

Species of flowering plant

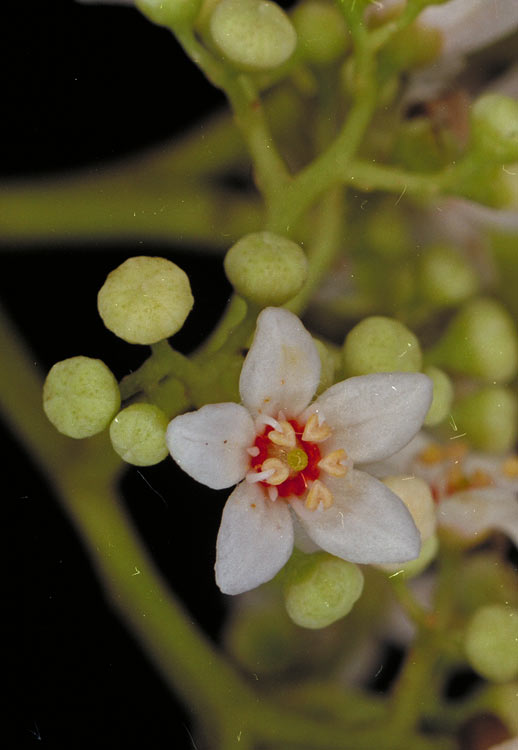
Flower detail

Flindersia ifflana, commonly known as hickory ash or Cairns hickory, is a species of tree in the family Rutaceae and is native to Papua New Guinea and Queensland. It has pinnate leaves with between four and twelve egg-shaped to elliptical leaflets, panicles of white or cream-coloured flowers and woody fruit studded with rough points.

== Description ==
Flindersia ifflana is a tree that typically grows to a height of 35 m (115 ft) and has thick fissured bark on old trees. The leaves are arranged in opposite pairs and are pinnate, 130–340 mm (5.1–13.4 in) long with four to twelve egg-shaped to elliptical leaflets that are 60–135 mm (2.4–5.3 in) long and 25–55 mm (0.98–2.17 in) wide on petiolules 4–10 mm (0.16–0.39 in) long. The flowers are arranged in panicles 100–250 mm (3.9–9.8 in) long, with at least a few male-only flowers. The sepals are about 1 mm (0.039 in) long and the petals are cream-coloured or white, 2–2.5 mm (0.079–0.098 in) long. Flowering occurs from October to March and the fruit is a woody capsule 32–55 mm (1.3–2.2 in) long, containing seeds that are 27–33 mm (1.1–1.3 in) long.

== Taxonomy ==
Flindersia ifflana was first formally described in 1877 by Ferdinand von Mueller in Fragmenta phytographiae Australiae from specimens collected by Walter Hill near Trinity Bay.

== Distribution and habitat ==
Hickory ash grows in rainforest and is found in Papua New Guinea and in Queensland where it occurs at altitudes between 30 and 900 m (98 and 2,953 ft) from Cape Grenville to near Atherton.
