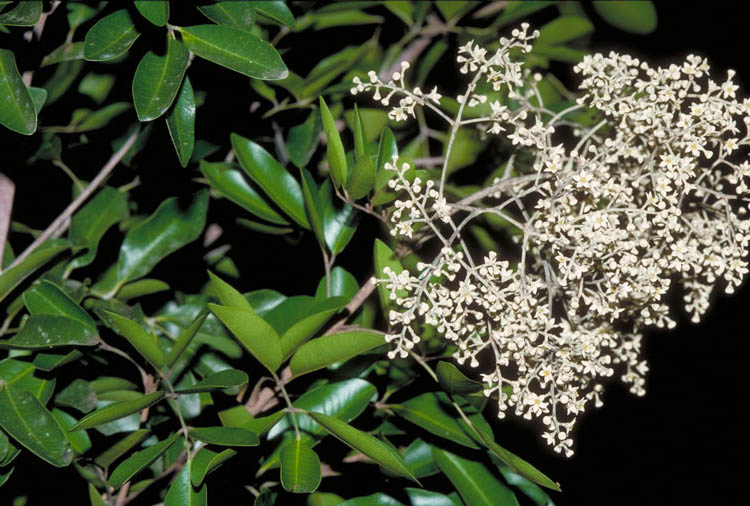

Scientific classification
- Kingdom: Plantae
- Clade: Tracheophytes
- Clade: Angiosperms
- Clade: Eudicots
- Clade: Rosids
- Order: Sapindales
- Family: Rutaceae
- Genus: Flindersia
- Species: F. brassii

Binomial name
- Flindersia brassii T.G.Hartley & B.Hyland

= Flindersia brassii =

Hard scented maple

Species of tree

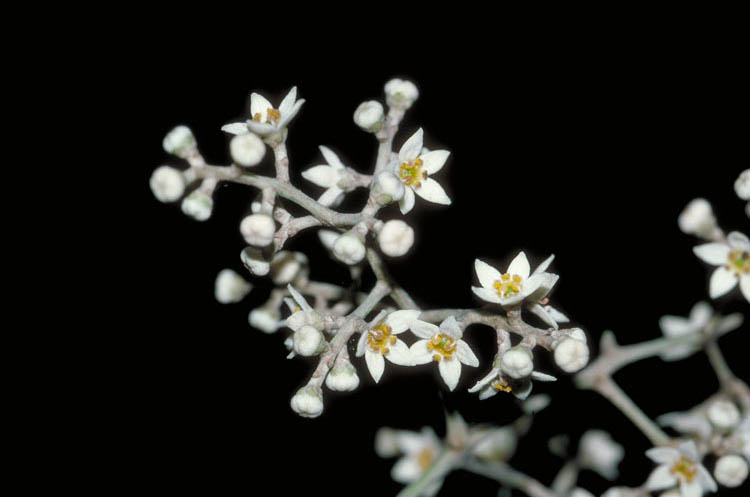
Flower detail

Flindersia brassii, commonly known as hard scented maple or Claudie River scented maple, is a species of tree that is endemic to Queensland. It has pinnate leaves with between four and nine narrow elliptical leaflets, white or cream-coloured flowers arranged in panicles, and fruit studded with rough points.

== Description ==
Flindersia brassii is a tree that typically grows to a height of 30 m (98 ft). Its leaves are pinnate, arranged in more or less opposite pairs with between four and nine elliptical leaflets mostly 40–80 mm (1.6–3.1 in) long and 15–37 mm (0.59–1.46 in) wide, the side leaflets on petiolules 2–6 mm (0.079–0.236 in) long, the end leaflet on a petiolule 7–16 mm (0.28–0.63 in) long. The flowers are arranged in panicles 120–170 mm (4.7–6.7 in) long and have five sepals 1–1.5 mm (0.039–0.059 in) long and five white or cream-coloured petals 3.5–4 mm (0.14–0.16 in) long. Flowering occurs in January and the fruit is a capsule 70–110 mm (2.8–4.3 in) long, studded with rough points up to 4.5 mm (0.18 in) long, separating into five at maturity and releasing seeds that are winged at both ends.

== Taxonomy ==
Flindersia brassii was first formally described in 1975 by Thomas Gordon Hartley and Bernard Hyland in the Journal of the Arnold Arboretum, from specimens Hyland collected near the Upper Claudie River in the Iron Range. The specific epithet (brassii) honours Leonard John Brass.

== Distribution and habitat ==
Hard scented maple is only known from the type location and nearby Mount Carter where it grows in dry rainforest at altitudes between 60 and 540 m (200 and 1,770 ft).

== Conservation status ==
Flindersia brassii is classified as of "least concern" under the Queensland Government Nature Conservation Act 1992.
