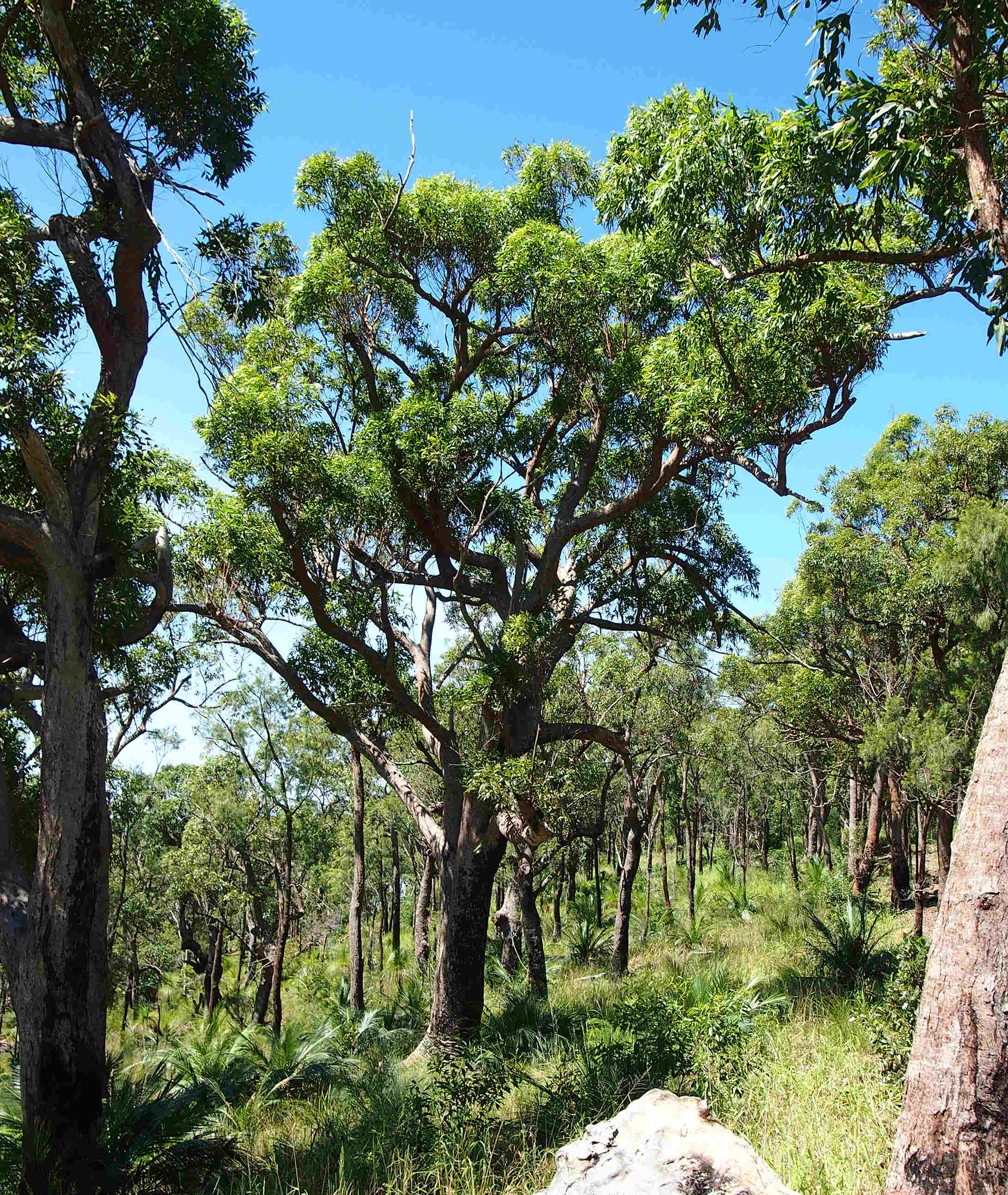

Scientific classification
- Kingdom: Plantae
- Clade: Embryophytes
- Clade: Tracheophytes
- Clade: Spermatophytes
- Clade: Angiosperms
- Clade: Eudicots
- Clade: Rosids
- Order: Myrtales
- Family: Myrtaceae
- Genus: Corymbia
- Species: C. clarksoniana

Binomial name
- Corymbia clarksoniana (D.J.Carr & S.G.M.Carr) K.D.Hill & L.A.S.Johnson

Synonyms
- Corymbia dolichocarpa (D.J.Carr & S.G.M.Carr) K.D.Hill & L.A.S.Johnson; Corymbia ligans subsp. burdekinensis K.D.Hill & L.A.S.Johnson; Corymbia maritima K.D.Hill & L.A.S.Johnson; Eucalyptus clarksoniana D.J.Carr & S.G.M.Carr; Eucalyptus dolichocarpa D.J.Carr & S.G.M.Carr

= Corymbia clarksoniana =

Clarkson's bloodwood

Species of plant

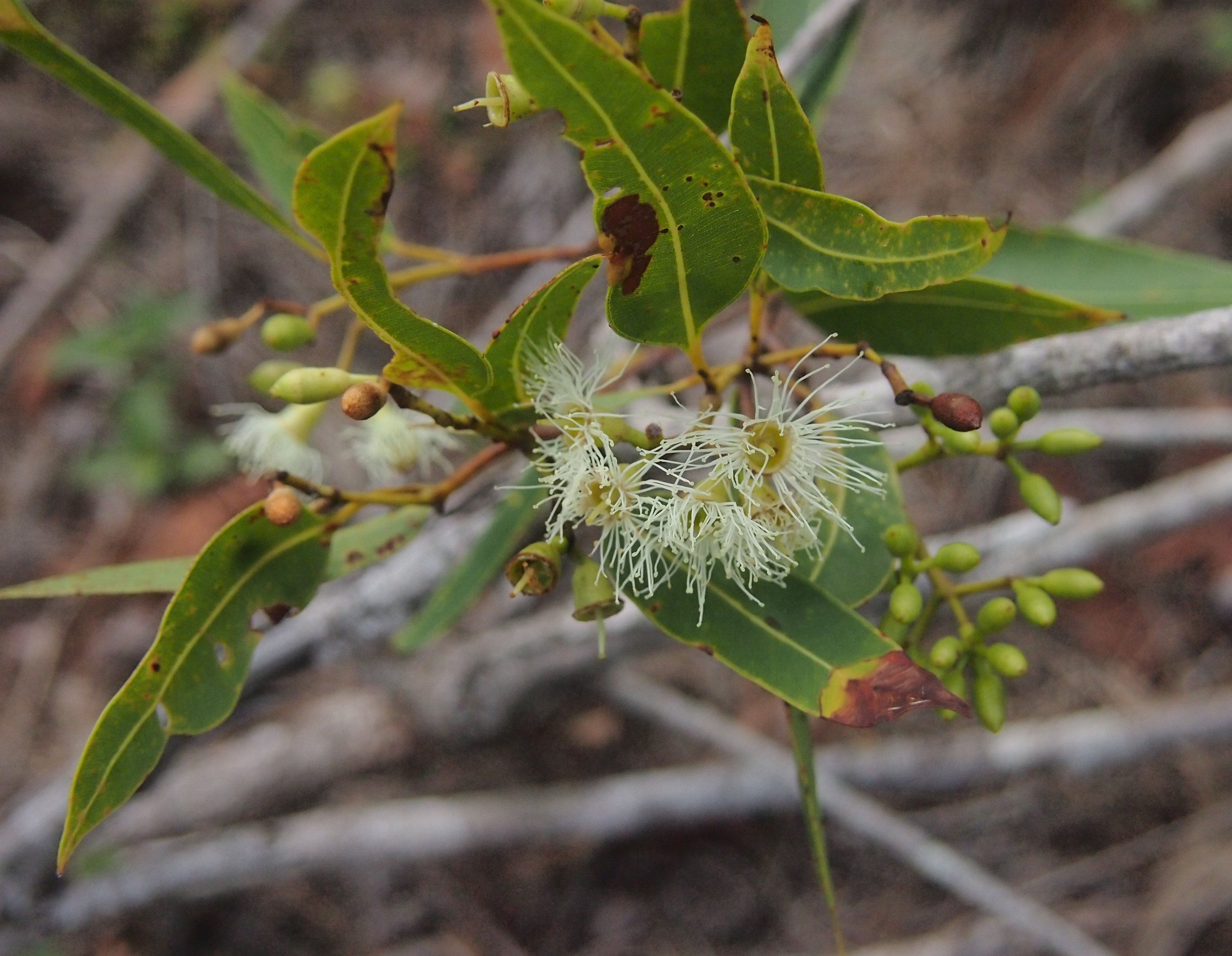
Corymbia clarskoniana flowers

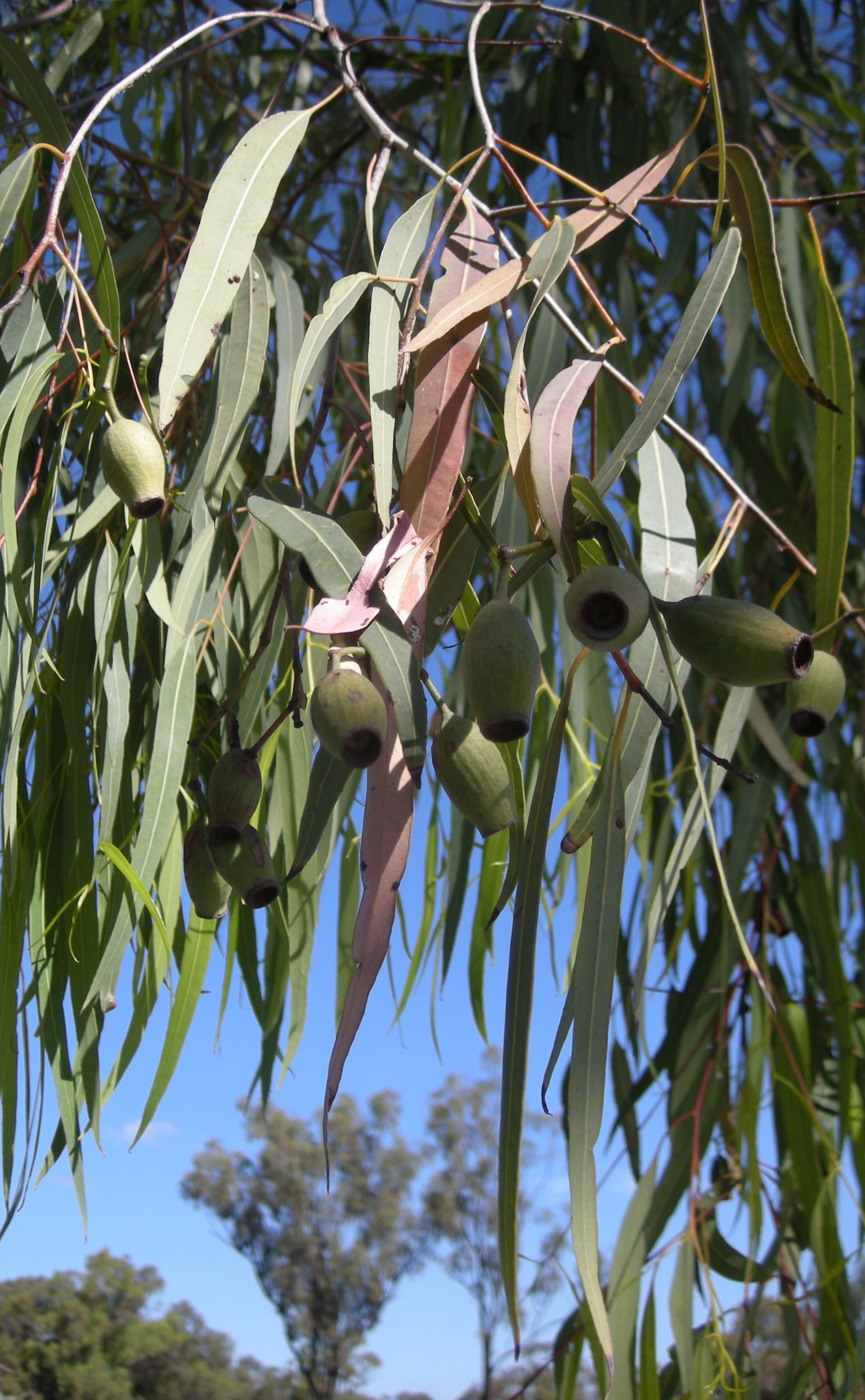
Corymbia clarksoniana capsules and foliage

Corymbia clarksoniana, commonly known as Clarkson's bloodwood or grey bloodwood, is a species of medium-sized tree that is native to Queensland and northern New South Wales. It has rough, tessellated greyish to brownish bark on the trunk and branches, lance-shaped, glossy green leaves that are paler on the lower surface, flower buds in groups of seven, white flowers and urn-shaped to barrel-shaped fruit.

== Description ==
The tree typically grows to a height of up to 20 m (66 ft) and has tessellated red-brown to grey-brown persistent bark throughout. The dull grey-green adult leaves have a disjunct arrangement and a narrow lanceolate to lanceolate shape that is basally tapered. The thin discolorous leaves have a length of 12 to 20 cm (4.7 to 7.9 in) and a width of 14 to 35 mm (0.55 to 1.38 in) with obscure lateral veins. The terminal compound inflorescences occur in groups of seven per umbel on pedicels with a length of 0.3 to 1 cm (0.12 to 0.39 in). The mature buds have an obovoid to pyriform shape with a length of 0.7 to 1.2 cm (0.28 to 0.47 in) and a width of 0.4 to 0.8 cm (0.16 to 0.31 in) with a rounded to conical and beaked operculum and white flowers. The species can flower as early as January but usually flowers between March and August. The fruits that appear after flowering are pedicellate with an urceolate to barrel shape. They are around 1.2 to 2.5 cm (0.47 to 0.98 in) in length and 0.9 to 1.6 cm (0.35 to 0.63 in) wide with a descending disc and three or four enclosed valves. The reddish brown seeds within the fruit have an ellipsoidal shape with a terminal wing and have a length of 9 to 11 mm (0.35 to 0.43 in).

== Taxonomy ==
The species was first formally described by the botanists Denis Carr and Stella Carr in 1987 as Eucalyptus clarksoniana, in their book Eucalyptus II - The rubber cuticle, and other studies of the Corymbosae. The type specimens were collected by J.R. Clarkson on the track between New Dixie and Killarney stations on Cape York. It was reclassified in 1995 as Corymbia clarksoniana by Ken Hill and Lawrie Johnson in the journal Telopea.

Corymbia clarksoniana is one of a group of five closely related species that are found in Queensland. The others are C. polycarpa, C. novoguinensis, C. plena and C. ligans.

The specific epithet honours John Richard Clarkson (born 1950) who worked at the Queensland Herbarium as a technician. He graduated from the University of Queensland in 1977 and was transferred to Mareeba in far north Queensland. He is a prolific botanical collector, contributing many specimens that are new to science.

The name C. clarksoniana is not listed at the National Herbarium of New South Wales, where C. dolichocarpa is described.

== Distribution and habitat ==
The tree is endemic to eastern parts of Queensland and far northern parts of New South Wales. The medium-sized bloodwood is found on inland plains and part of grassy woodlands and forests communities growing in sand and sandy loam soils but can be found in skeletal soils on ridges and hill tops.

Hill and Johnson described C. clarksoniana as endemic to Queensland but also recognised C. clarksoniana, C. dolichocarpa and C. maritima as distinct species with intermediate populations. They recorded C. dolichocarpa as occurring from Charters Towers in Queensland to near Narrabri in New South Wales and C. maritima from near-coastal areas from Cardwell to the Whitsundays. The Australian Plant Census considers all three to constitute a single species.

== See also ==
- List of Corymbia species
