= Botanical Miscellany =

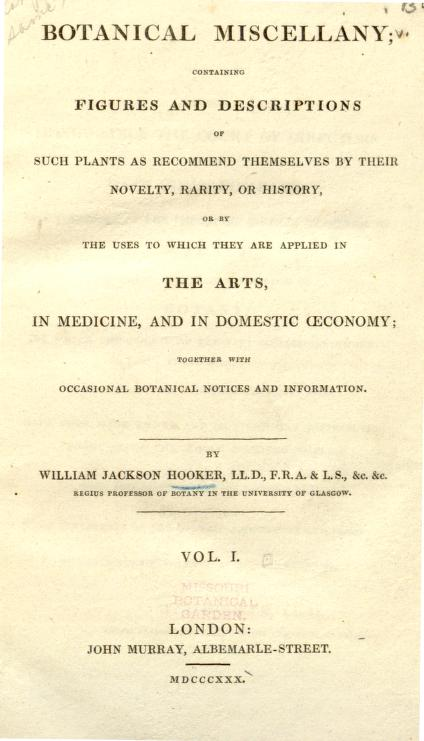
Cover of Volume 1 Botanical Miscellany

Botanical Miscellany was a short-lived botany magazine edited by William Jackson Hooker. Only three volumes appeared, in 1830, 1831 and 1833.

== Publication details ==
- Sir Hooker W. J. Botanical miscellany: containing figures and descriptions of such plants as recommend themselves by their novelty, rarity or history / Hooker W. J. — il. — London: John Murray, 1830. — Vol. 1. — 356 p.
- Sir Hooker W. J. Botanical miscellany: Vol. 1–3. [afterw. The Journal of botany. Pt. 1, vol. 2—4 [afterw.] The London journal of botany. Vol. 1—7 [afterw.] Hooker's journal of botany and Kew garden miscellany. Vol. 1–9. [Ed.] by W. J. Hooker]. — il. — London: John Murray, 1831. — Vol. 2. — 421 p.
- Sir Hooker W. J. Botanical Miscellany: Containing Figures and Descriptions of Such Plants as Recommended Themselves by Their Novelty, Rarity, Or History, Or by the Uses to which They are Applied in the Arts, in Medicine, and in Domestic Economy: Together with Occasional Botanical Notices and Information / Hooker W. J. — London: John Murray, 1833. — Vol. 3. — 390 p.

3 v. (356; 421; 390 p.; xci leaves of plates; xcii-cxii, xli leaves of plates (some folded and col.)) : ill.; 25 cm . Contains many Australian plant references and special articles. Ferguson 1367a.
