= Corymbia ligans =

Scientific classification
- Kingdom: Plantae
- Clade: Embryophytes
- Clade: Tracheophytes
- Clade: Spermatophytes
- Clade: Angiosperms
- Clade: Eudicots
- Clade: Rosids
- Order: Myrtales
- Family: Myrtaceae
- Genus: Corymbia
- Species: C. ligans

Binomial name
- Corymbia ligans K.D.Hill & L.A.S.Johnson

Synonyms
- Corymbia ligans K.D.Hill & L.A.S.Johnson subsp. ligans; Corymbia ligans subsp. novocastrensis K.D.Hill & L.A.S.Johnson

Species of plant

Corymbia ligans is a species of tree that is endemic to north-eastern Queensland. It has rough bark on the trunk and branches, narrow lance-shaped adult leaves, flower buds in groups of seven and elongated barrel-shaped fruit.

== Description ==
Corymbia ligans is a tree that typically grows to a height of 20 m (66 ft) and forms a lignotuber. It has rough, tessellated, greyish bark on the trunk and branches. Young plants and coppice regrowth have narrow elliptic, later lance-shaped leaves that are 80–100 mm (3.1–3.9 in) long, 14–18 mm (0.55–0.71 in) wide and paler on the lower surface. Adult leaves are glossy green on the upper surface, paler below, narrow lance-shaped, 77–150 mm (3.0–5.9 in) long and 8–16 mm (0.31–0.63 in) wide tapering to a petiole 8–19 mm (0.31–0.75 in) long. The flower buds are arranged on the ends of branchlets on a branched peduncle 5–18 mm (0.20–0.71 in) long, each branch of the peduncle with seven buds on pedicels 3–6 mm (0.12–0.24 in) long. Mature buds are oval to narrow pear-shaped, 7–9 mm (0.28–0.35 in) long and 4–5 mm (0.16–0.20 in) wide with a rounded operculum. The flowering time and flower colour have not been recorded. The fruit is a woody elongated barrel-shaped capsule with the valves enclosed in the fruit.

== Taxonomy and naming ==
Corymbia ligans was first formally described in 1995 by Ken Hill and Lawrie Johnson from specimens collected 40 km (25 mi) south of Greenvale on the road to Charters Towers.

== Distribution and habitat ==
This eucalypt usually grows in shallow soil on stony or sandy hills mostly near Greenvale, The Lynd, Einasleigh and the Newcastle Range.

== See also ==
- List of Corymbia species
