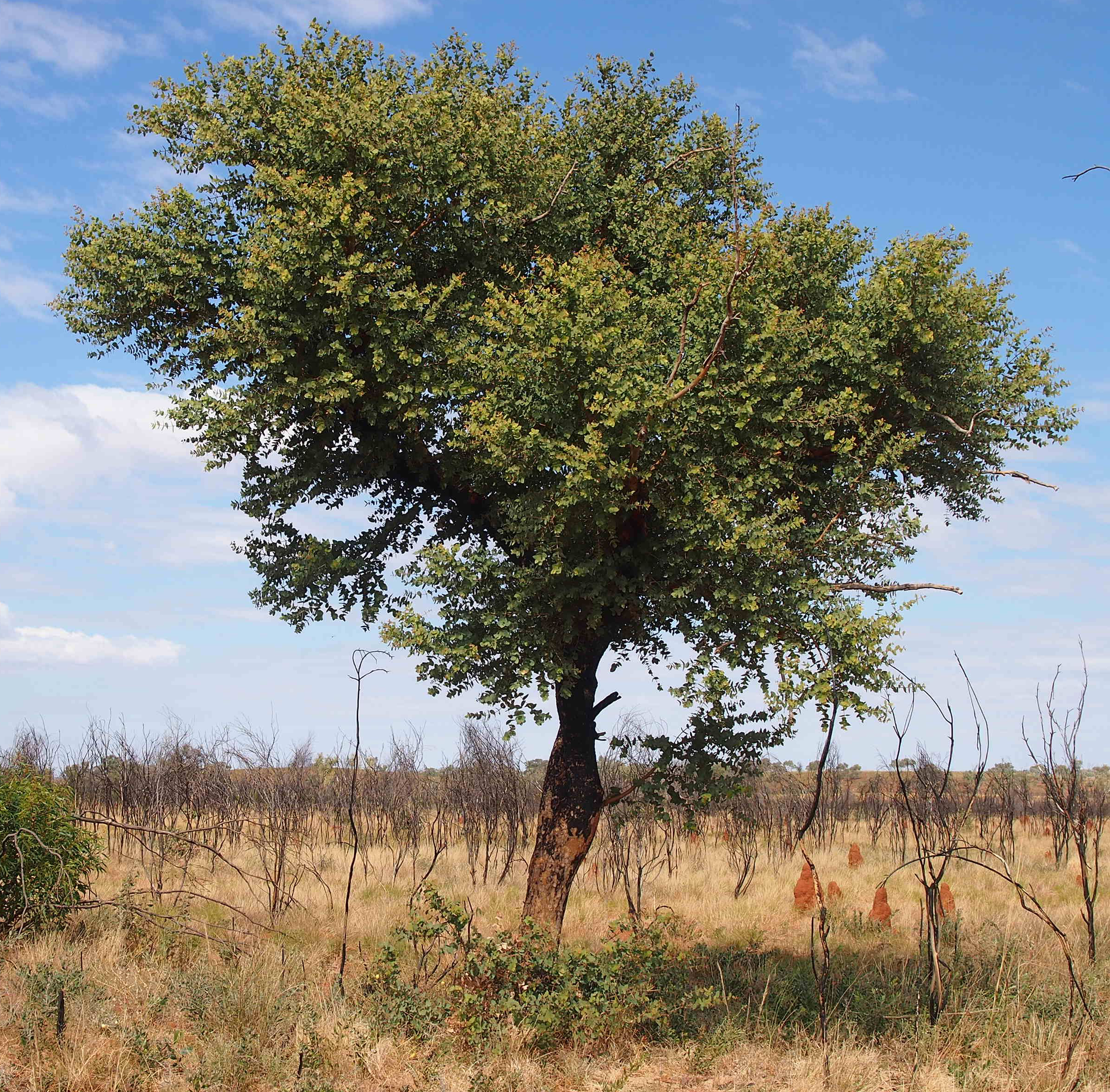

Scientific classification
- Kingdom: Plantae
- Clade: Tracheophytes
- Clade: Angiosperms
- Clade: Eudicots
- Clade: Rosids
- Order: Myrtales
- Family: Myrtaceae
- Genus: Corymbia
- Species: C. setosa

Binomial name
- Corymbia setosa (Schauer) K.D.Hill & L.A.S.Johnson

Synonyms
- Corymbia setosa subsp. pedicellaris K.D.Hill & L.A.S.Johnson; Corymbia setosa (Schauer)K.D.Hill & L.A.S.Johnson subsp. setosa; Eucalyptus hispida R.Br. ex Maiden nom. inval., pro syn.; Eucalyptus setosa Schauer

= Corymbia setosa =

Rough-leaved bloodwood

Species of plant

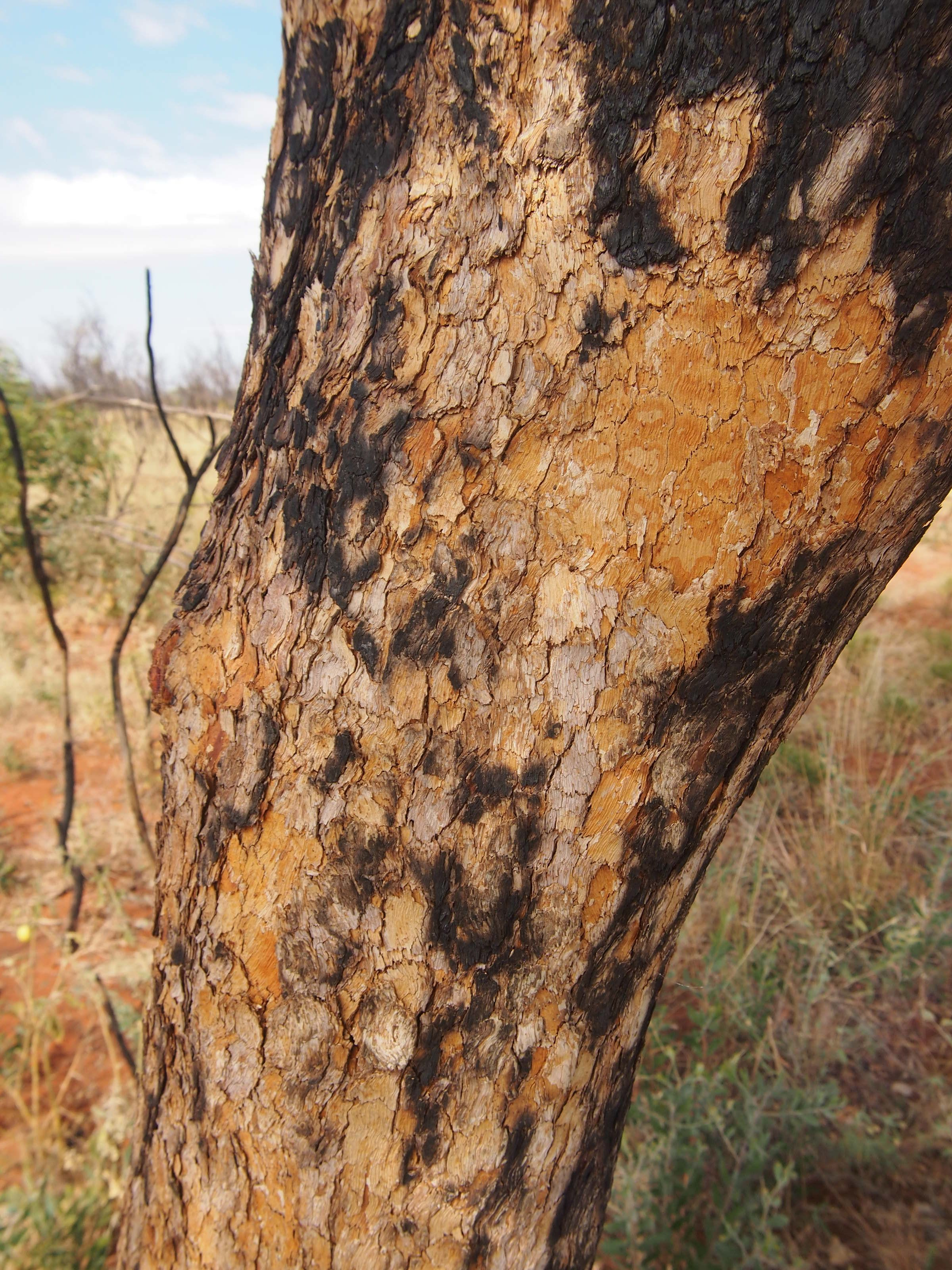
bark

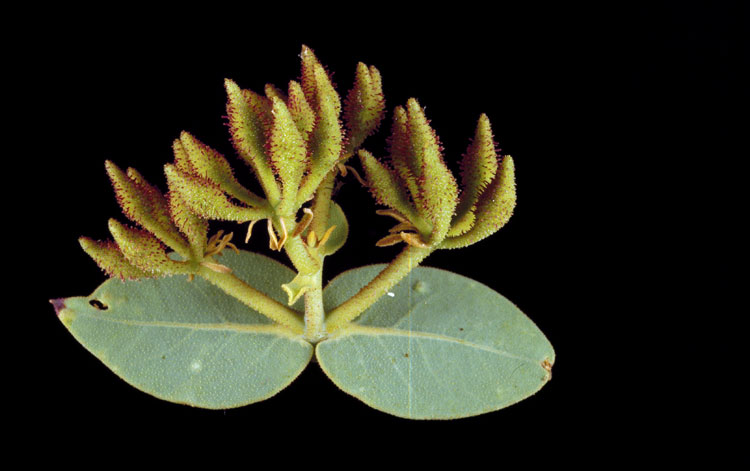
flower buds

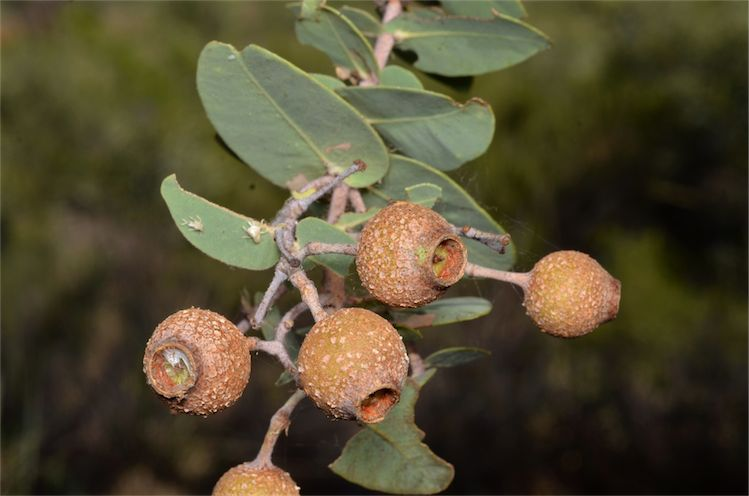
fruit

Corymbia setosa, commonly known as rough leaved bloodwood or desert bloodwood, is a species of small tree that is endemic to north-eastern Australia. It has rough, tessellated brown bark on the trunk and branches, a crown of juvenile, heart-shaped leaves arranged in opposite pairs, flower buds in groups of three or seven, white flowers and urn-shaped to shortened spherical fruit.

== Description ==
Corymbia setosa is a tree that typically grows to a height of 4 metres (13 ft), rarely as a thick-trunked mallee, and forms a lignotuber. It has rough, deeply tessellated brownish bark on the trunk and branches and a sparse canopy. Young plants and coppice regrowth have sessile, heart-shaped leaves that are 38–78 mm (1.5–3.1 in) long and 17–33 mm (0.67–1.30 in) wide arranged in opposite pairs and with a rough surface. The crown of the tree has sessile, juvenile mostly heart-shaped, stem-clasping leaves that are the same shade of dull light green to greyish green on both sides, 27–77 mm (1.1–3.0 in) long and 10–50 mm (0.39–1.97 in) wide and arranged in opposite pairs. The flower buds are arranged on the ends of branchlets on a branched peduncle 3–25 mm (0.12–0.98 in) long, each branch of the peduncle with three or seven buds on pedicels 3–10 mm (0.12–0.39 in) long. Mature buds are pear-shaped, 6–12 mm (0.24–0.47 in) long and 5–7 mm (0.20–0.28 in) wide with a beaked operculum. Flowering has been observed in June, September and November and the flowers are white. The fruit is a woody urn-shaped or shortened spherical capsule 11–28 mm (0.43–1.10 in) long and 11–25 mm (0.43–0.98 in) wide with the valves enclosed in the fruit.

== Taxonomy and naming ==
This eucalypt was first formally described in 1843 by Johannes Conrad Schauer in Walpers' book Repertorium Botanices Systematicae and given the name Eucalyptus setosa from specimens collected by Ferdinand Bauer. In 1995 Ken Hill and Lawrie Johnson changed the name to Corymbia setosa. The specific epithet (setosa) is from the Latin word setosus meaning "bristly".

In the same journal, Hill and Johnson described two subspecies, pedicellaris and subspecies setosa but the names are not accepted by the Australian Plant Census.

== Distribution and habitat ==
Corymbia setosa grows on rocky hills and red sandy plains, but not extending to wet tropical areas. It is found from Tennant Creek, Northern Territory, Daly Waters and the Barkly Tableland in the Northern Territory and east into the Gulf of Carpentaria hinterland and islands, to the Musgrave area of Cape York Peninsula and as far south as Barcaldine in Queensland.

In a woodland setting, associated species include Erythrophleum chlorostachys, Eucalyptus foelscheana, Xanthostemon paradoxus, Eucalyptus confertiflora and Eucalyptus latifolia in the overstorey and Grevillea decurrens, Gardenia megasperma and Calytrix exstipulata in the sparsely vegetated understorey.

== Conservation status ==
This species of eucalypt is classified as of "least concern" under the Queensland Government Nature Conservation Act 1992.

== See also ==
- List of Corymbia species
