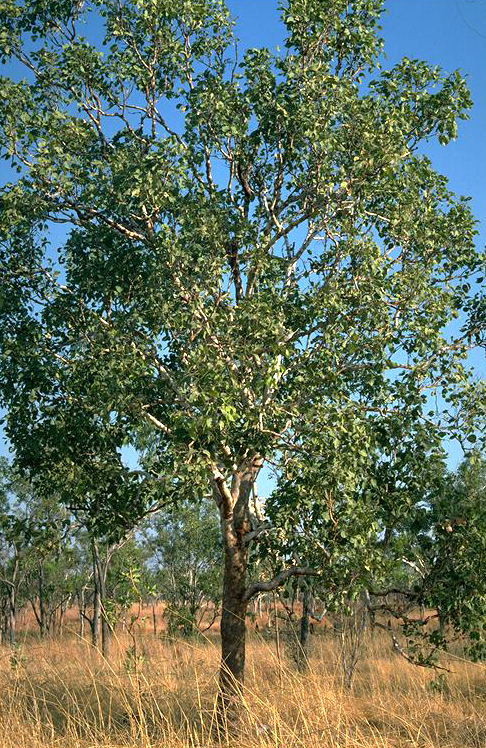
- Corymbia foelscheana at Katherine

Scientific classification
- Kingdom: Plantae
- Clade: Embryophytes
- Clade: Tracheophytes
- Clade: Spermatophytes
- Clade: Angiosperms
- Clade: Eudicots
- Clade: Rosids
- Order: Myrtales
- Family: Myrtaceae
- Genus: Corymbia
- Species: C. foelscheana

Binomial name
- Corymbia foelscheana (F.Muell.) K.D.Hill & L.A.S.Johnson

Synonyms
- Eucalyptus darwinensis D.J.Carr & S.G.M.Carr; Eucalyptus foelscheana F.Muell.; Eucalyptus kakadu D.J.Carr & S.G.M.Carr; Eucalyptus leiophloia Blakely & Jacobs; Eucalyptus leiophloia Blakely & Jacobs var. leiophloia; Eucalyptus leiophloia var. lepidophloia Blakely & Jacobs

= Corymbia foelscheana =

Broad-leaved bloodwood

Species of plant

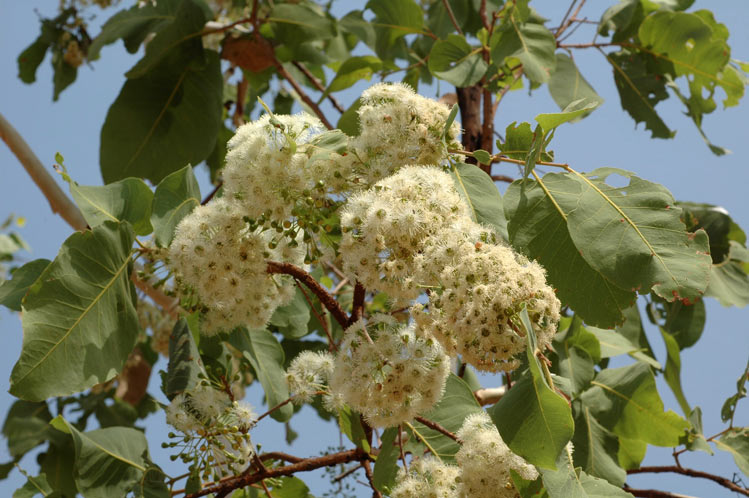
flowers and leaves

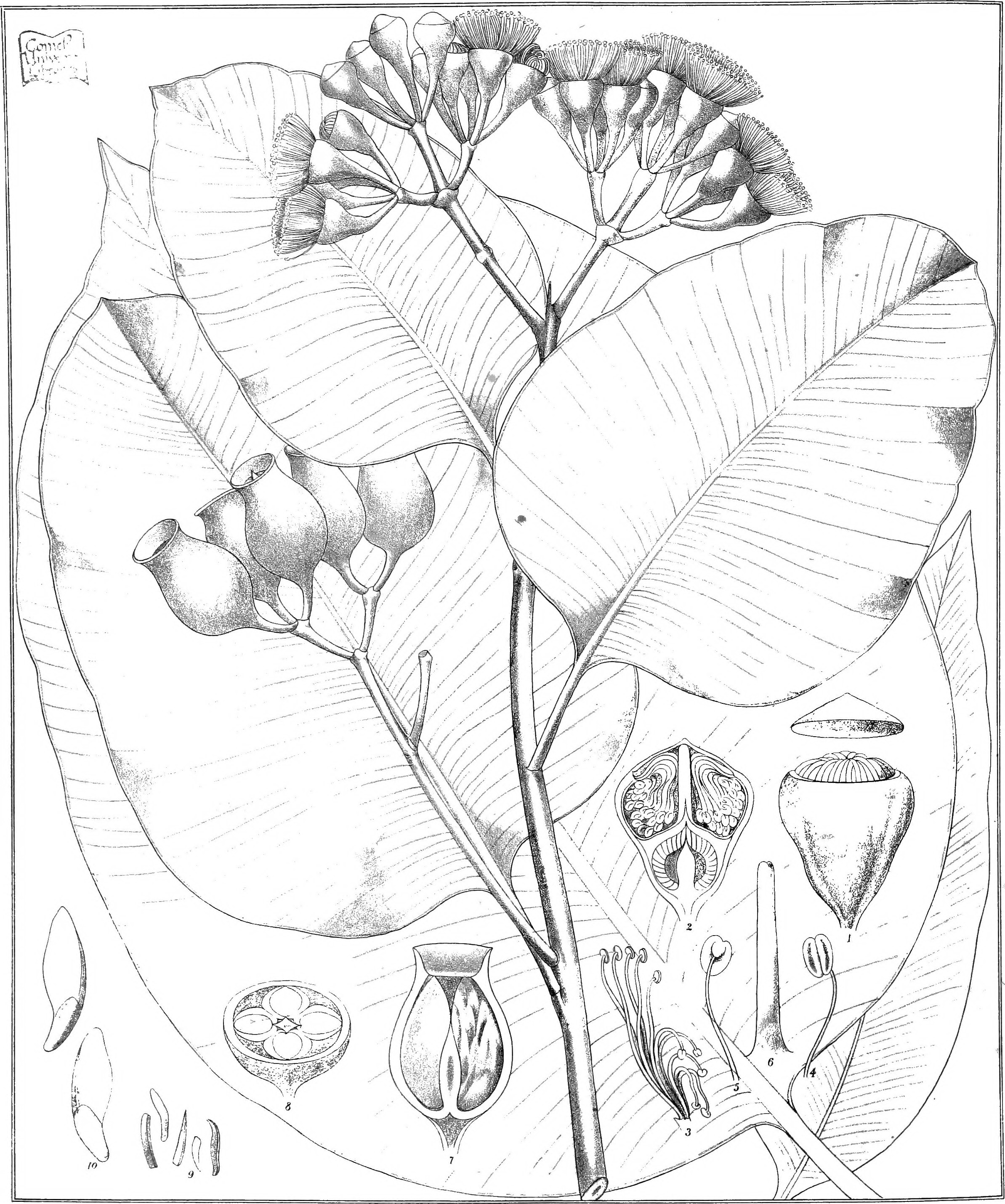
Illustration from Eucalyptographia

Corymbia foelscheana, commonly known as broad-leaved bloodwood, fan-leaved bloodwood or smooth-barked bloodwood, is a species of small tree that is endemic to northern Australia. It has thin, rough, tessellated bark on some or all of the trunk, smooth bark above, broadly egg-shaped to broadly lance- shaped adult leaves, flower buds usually in groups of seven, creamy white flowers and urn-shaped fruit.

== Description ==
Corymbia foelscheana is a tree that typically grows to a height to 5–12 m (16–39 ft) and forms a lignotuber. It has thin, rough, tessellated brown, grey or reddish bark that is shed in small polygonal flakes, on part or all of the trunk, smooth white to cream-coloured bark above. Young plants and coppice regrowth have dull green, broadly egg-shaped to oblong or round leaves that are 170–250 mm (6.7–9.8 in) long and 150–185 mm (5.9–7.3 in) wide with a wavy margin. Adult leaves are arranged alternately, the same shade of dull green on both sides, broadly egg-shaped to broadly lance-shaped, 100–275 mm (3.9–10.8 in) long and 40–135 mm (1.6–5.3 in) wide on a petiole 18–40 mm (0.71–1.57 in) long. The flower buds are mostly arranged on the ends of branchlets on a branched peduncle 9–50 mm (0.35–1.97 in) long, each branch of the peduncle usually with seven buds on pedicels 5–14 mm (0.20–0.55 in) long. Mature buds are oval to pear-shaped, 9–14 mm (0.35–0.55 in) long and 7–9 mm (0.28–0.35 in) wide with a rounded operculum that sometimes has rounded knob in the centre. Flowering occurs from December to January or from January to May and the flowers are creamy white. The fruit is a woody urn-shaped capsule 22–30 mm (0.87–1.18 in) long and 14–24 mm (0.55–0.94 in) wide with the valves enclosed in the fruit.

== Taxonomy and naming ==
The broad-leaved bloodwood was first formally described in 1882 by Ferdinand von Mueller in The Chemist and Druggist with Australasian Supplement and given the name Eucalyptus foelscheana. The type specimens were collected "near Port Darwin" by Paul Foelsche. In 1995 Ken Hill and Lawrie Johnson changed the name to Corymbia foelscheana.

== Distribution and habitat ==
This eucalypt grows on gentle slopes, on low rocky hills in open forest and in low open woodland usually in loamy and laterite soils. It occurs from the Kimberley region of Western Australia and east through the top end of the Northern Territory, including on Melville Island.

In a woodland setting associated species include Erythrophleum chlorostachys, Xanthostemon paradoxus, Eucalyptus setosa, Eucalyptus confertiflora and Eucalyptus latifolia in the overstorey and Grevillea decurrens, Gardenia megasperma and Calytrix exstipulata in the sparsely vegetated understorey.

== See also ==
- List of Corymbia species
