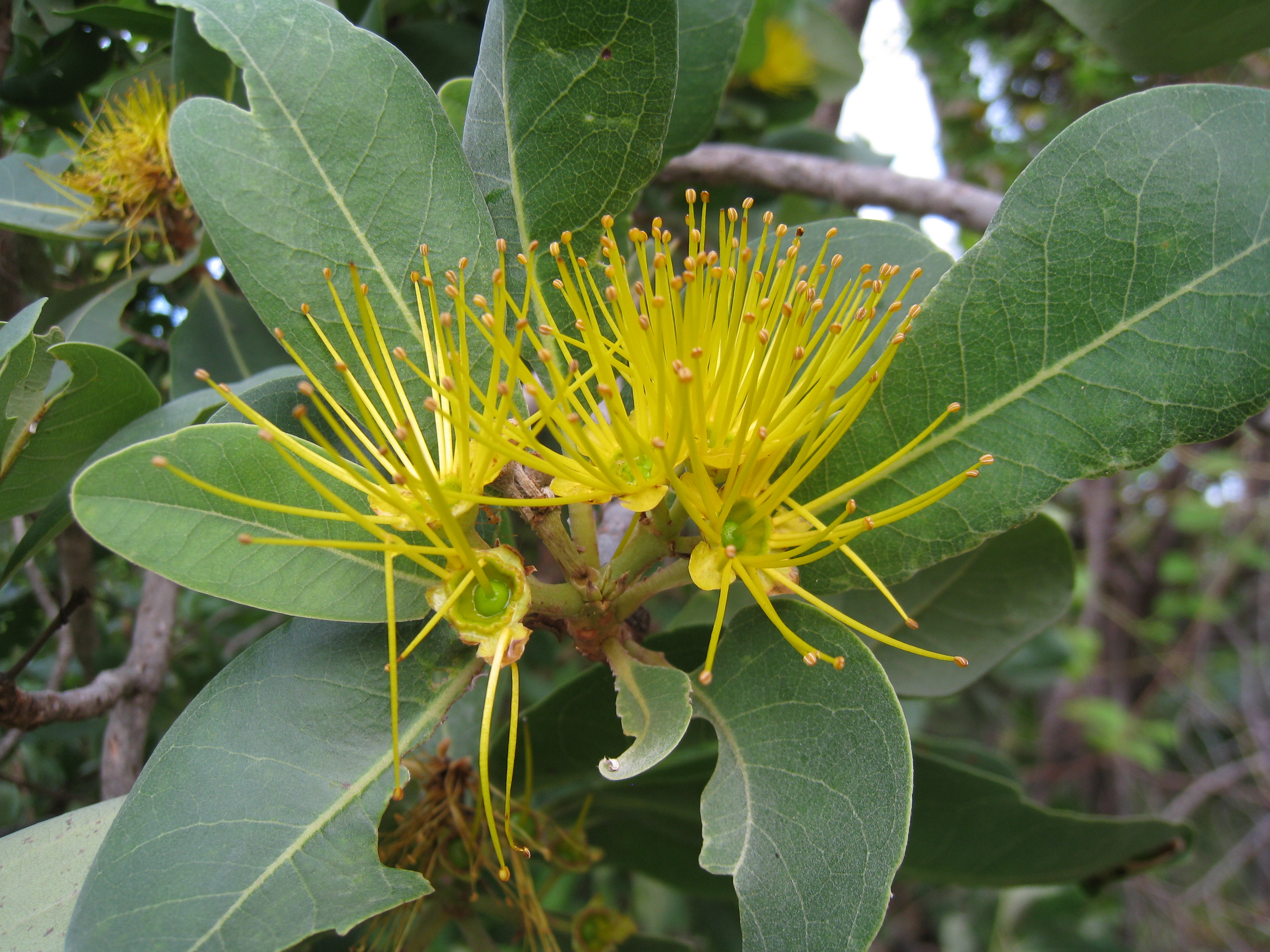
- Xanthostemon paradoxus flowers

Conservation status
- Data Deficient (IUCN 3.1)

Scientific classification
- Kingdom: Plantae
- Clade: Tracheophytes
- Clade: Angiosperms
- Clade: Eudicots
- Clade: Rosids
- Order: Myrtales
- Family: Myrtaceae
- Genus: Xanthostemon
- Species: X. paradoxus

Binomial name
- Xanthostemon paradoxus F.Muell.

= Xanthostemon paradoxus =

Species of shrub

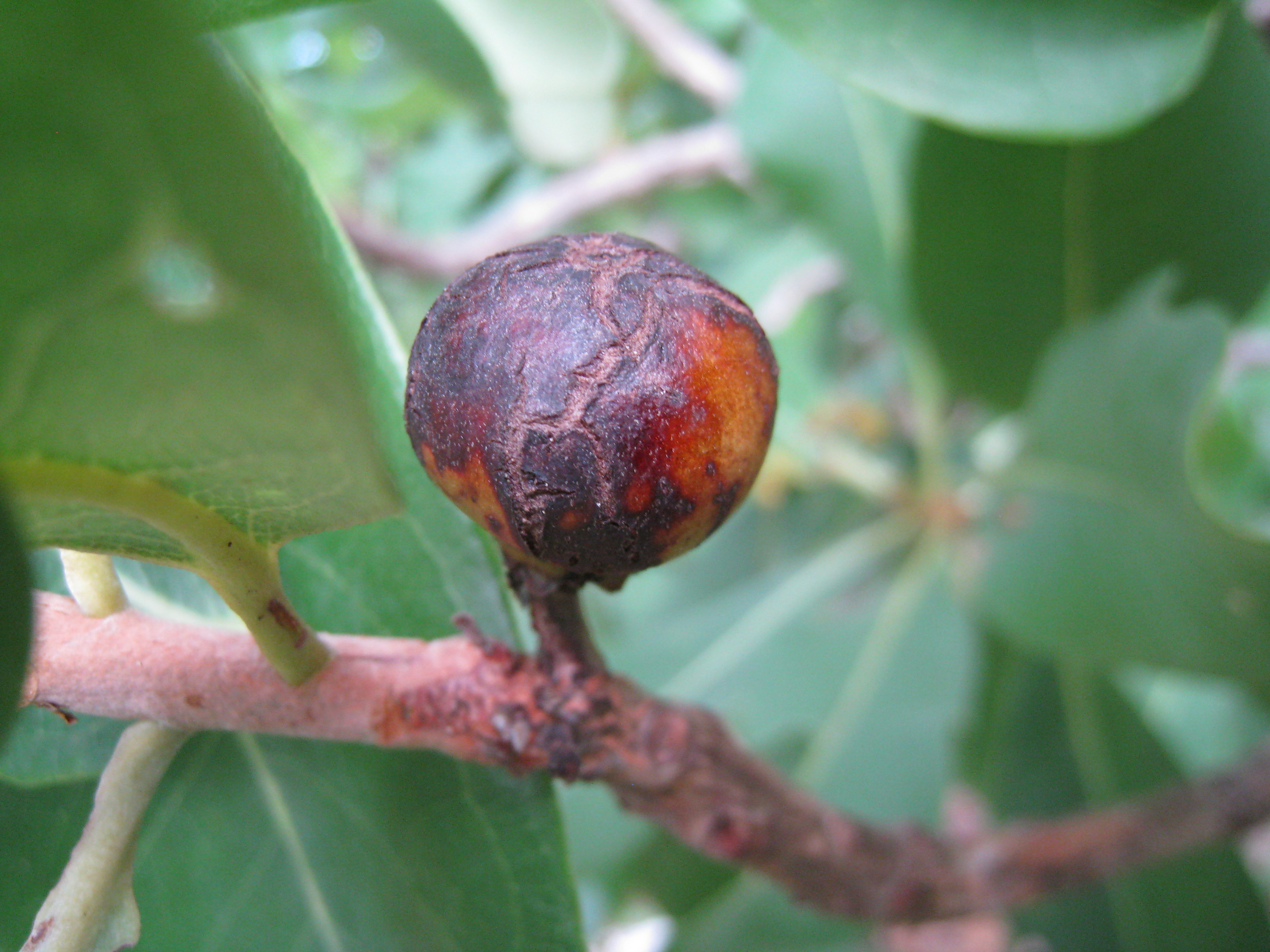
Xanthostemon paradoxus fruit 1

Xanthostemon paradoxus, commonly known as bridal tree or northern penda, is a shrub or tree species in the family Myrtaceae that is endemic to Australia.

The shrub or tree typically grows to a height of 3 to 12 metres (10 to 39 ft). It blooms between March and September producing yellow coloured flowers. The stem is usually a cream or pale colour with brittle stripes usually visible in the outer blaze. The bark is grey and rough and flaky. The leaf blades are approximately 5 to 16 centimetres (2 to 6 in) in length and 3 to 6 centimetres (1.2 to 2.4 in) wide with curving lateral veins curving. The leaves are alternate and discolorous and glabrous throughout. The blades are narrowly to broadly elliptic in shape with an obtuse to attenuate base obtuse and an obtuse apex obtuse. Leaves are attached to petioles that are 4 to 20 millimetres (0.2 to 0.8 in) long.

The inflorescence is cymose and all parts are glabrous to puberulous with a length of 25 to 70 mm (1.0 to 2.8 in). The pedicels are 6 to 10 mm (0.24 to 0.39 in) long. The calyx lobes triangular with ciliate margins. The petals are yellow with blades that are ovate to orbicular. Stamens are also yellow.

The fruits have a globular to depressed globular shape with a diameter of about 10 to 12 millimetres (0.39 to 0.47 in) with a calyx that is persistent at the base. The seeds are flat and round with a diameter of 2 to 4 millimetres (0.08 to 0.16 in).

The tree has a lifespan from 11 to 20 years, and will produce seeds after 6 years of age. Following bushfires it is an epicormic resprouter.

It is found along sandstone ridges and outcrops in the east Kimberley region of Western Australia between the Prince Regent National Park, Halls Creek and Kununurra extending into the Northern Territory from the border to central Arnhem Land and as far south as Timber Creek and as far north as the Tiwi Islands. Usually it is found among the open forest or on rocky hillsides but sometimes found in or on the margins of monsoon forest.

The species was first formally described by the botanist Ferdinand von Mueller in 1857 as part of the work Nova genera et species aliquot rariores in Plagis Australiae Intratropicis nuperrime detecta. as published in Hooker's Journal of Botany and Kew Garden Miscellany. Other synonyms include Metrosideros paradoxus and Nania paradoxus.

In a woodland setting associated species include Erythrophleum chlorostachys, Eucalyptus foelscheana, Eucalyptus setosa, Eucalyptus confertiflora and Eucalyptus latifolia in the overstorey and Grevillea decurrens, Gardenia megasperma and Calytrix exstipulata in the sparsely vegetated understorey.

The plant is commonly cultivated from seedlings in and around Darwin area as a shade tree in gardens and produces large bunches of yellow flowers, which attract birds. It has a compact form and is quite drought tolerant.
