= Acacia paula =

Conservation status
- Priority One — Poorly Known Taxa (DEC)

Scientific classification
- Kingdom: Plantae
- Clade: Embryophytes
- Clade: Tracheophytes
- Clade: Spermatophytes
- Clade: Angiosperms
- Clade: Eudicots
- Clade: Rosids
- Order: Fabales
- Family: Fabaceae
- Subfamily: Caesalpinioideae
- Clade: Mimosoid clade
- Genus: Acacia
- Species: A. paula

Binomial name
- Acacia paula Tindale & S.J.Davies

Species of legume

Acacia paula is a shrub belonging to the genus Acacia and the subgenus Juliflorae that is endemic to a small area of north western Australia.

== Description ==
The low prostrate shrub has many small branches sprouting from subterranean rootstock. The glabrous, green to brown, virgate and angular branchlets often have resin-crenulated ridges. Like most species of Acacia it has phyllodes rather than true leaves. The evergreen phyllodes have a linear shape and are quite flat and straight with a length of 4 to 15 cm (1.6 to 5.9 in) and a width of 0.8 to 3 mm (0.031 to 0.118 in). They are usually slightly resinous and have one to two more prominent, excentric longitudinal veins with many inconspicuous parallel minor veins. It flowers from February to June producing yellow flowers. It produces cylindrical to spherical flower-spikes with a length of 4 to 12 mm (0.16 to 0.47 in) that are densely packed with golden flowers. Following flowering light brown coloured seed pods form that have a linear shape and are mostly flat and straight but are lightly curved at the apex. The pods have a length of 4 to 5.5 cm (1.6 to 2.2 in) and a width of 3.5 to 4.5 mm (0.14 to 0.18 in) and are tapered at base and apex. The dark brown seeds inside are arranged obliquely and have an elliptic shape but are dorsoventrally flattened with a length of around 4.2 mm (0.17 in).

== Distribution ==
It is native to a small area in the East Kimberley region of Western Australia where it grows in gravelly lateritic soils. It is situated on the Mitchell Plateau over laterite and less frequently over basalt often as a part of low open forest communities where it is associated with Corymbia confertiflora.

== See also ==
- List of Acacia species
