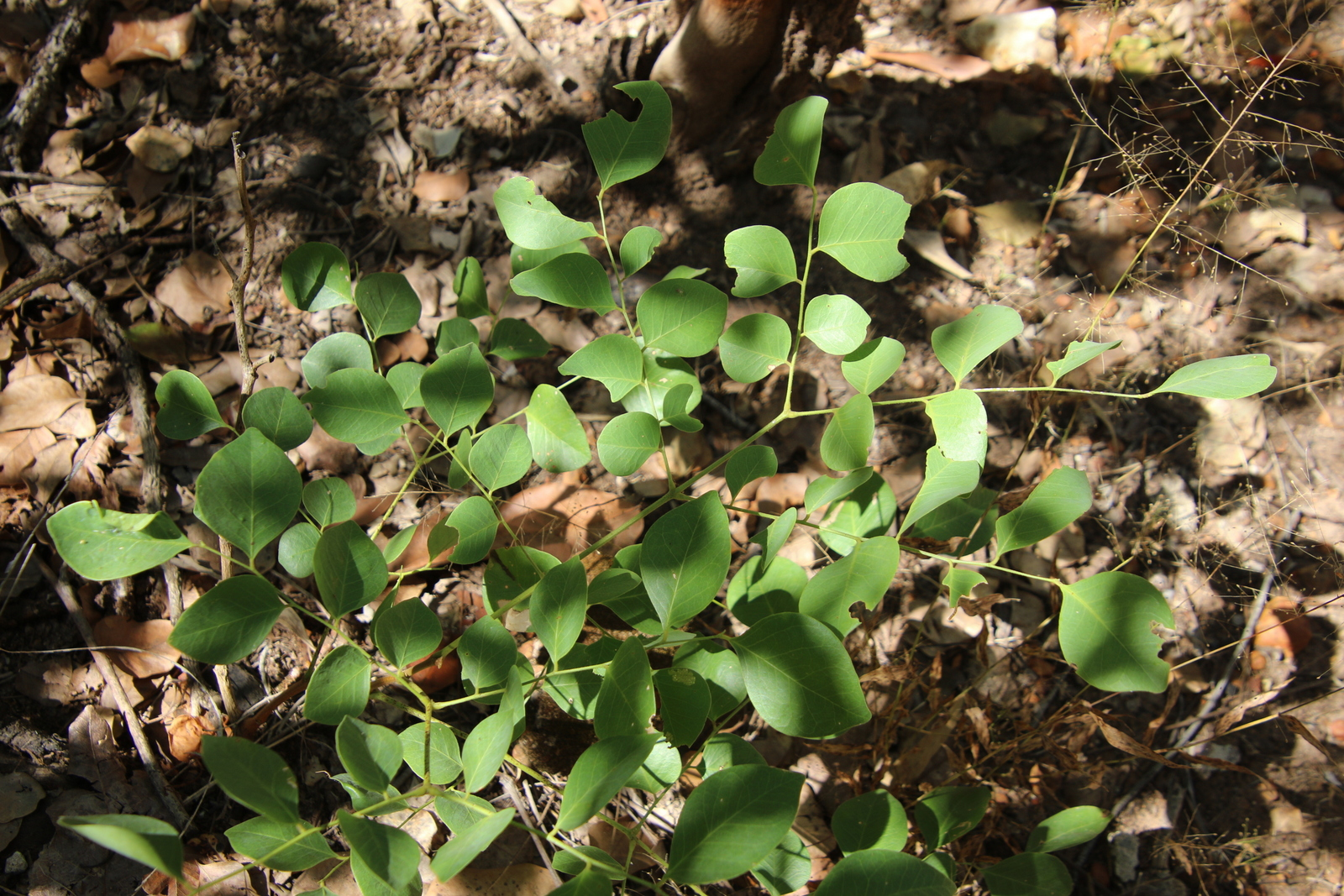
- Litchfield National Park, Australia

Conservation status
- Least Concern (IUCN 3.1)

Scientific classification
- Kingdom: Plantae
- Clade: Tracheophytes
- Clade: Angiosperms
- Clade: Eudicots
- Clade: Rosids
- Order: Fabales
- Family: Fabaceae
- Subfamily: Caesalpinioideae
- Genus: Erythrophleum
- Species: E. chlorostachys

Binomial name
- Erythrophleum chlorostachys (F.Muell.) Baill.

Synonyms
- Erythrophleum laboucheri F.Muell. ex Benth. Laboucheria chlorostachya F.Muell.

= Erythrophleum chlorostachys =

Species of plant

Erythrophleum chlorostachys, commonly known as Cooktown ironwood, is a species of leguminous tree endemic to northern Australia.

== Description ==
The Cooktown ironwood is semi-deciduous, dropping much of its foliage in response to the prolonged winter dry periods which are the norm within its native range. The foliage of the tree contains toxic levels of alkaloids and has been responsible for numerous deaths of both cattle and horses. The species is a source of timber, which is exceptionally hard and dense as well as being highly termite resistant.

== Distribution and habitat ==
The species occurs from north-eastern Queensland to the Kimberley region of Western Australia. It is found in a wide range of environments, from arid savanna to tropical rainforest.

== Usage ==
Virtually all culturally modified trees in Eucalyptus tetrodonta woodland on Cape York Peninsula are Cooktown ironwoods. Most of these are 'sugar bag scars' where Aboriginal people have cut through the cambium into the heartwood of the tree to remove honey from native bees. Scars have been made using both stone axes (in pre-contact times) and steel axes (post-contact). These have particular significance to Aboriginal people as the tangible representation of past cultural practices. The large number of hollows found in Cooktown ironwoods at Kakadu National Park are also likely to be culturally modified trees (e.g. Taylor 2002 Figure 6.8).

== Alkaloids ==
Norerythrostachaldine

A cytotoxic alkaloid that is present in Erythrophleum chlorostachys is called norerythrostachaldine [55729-25-4].
