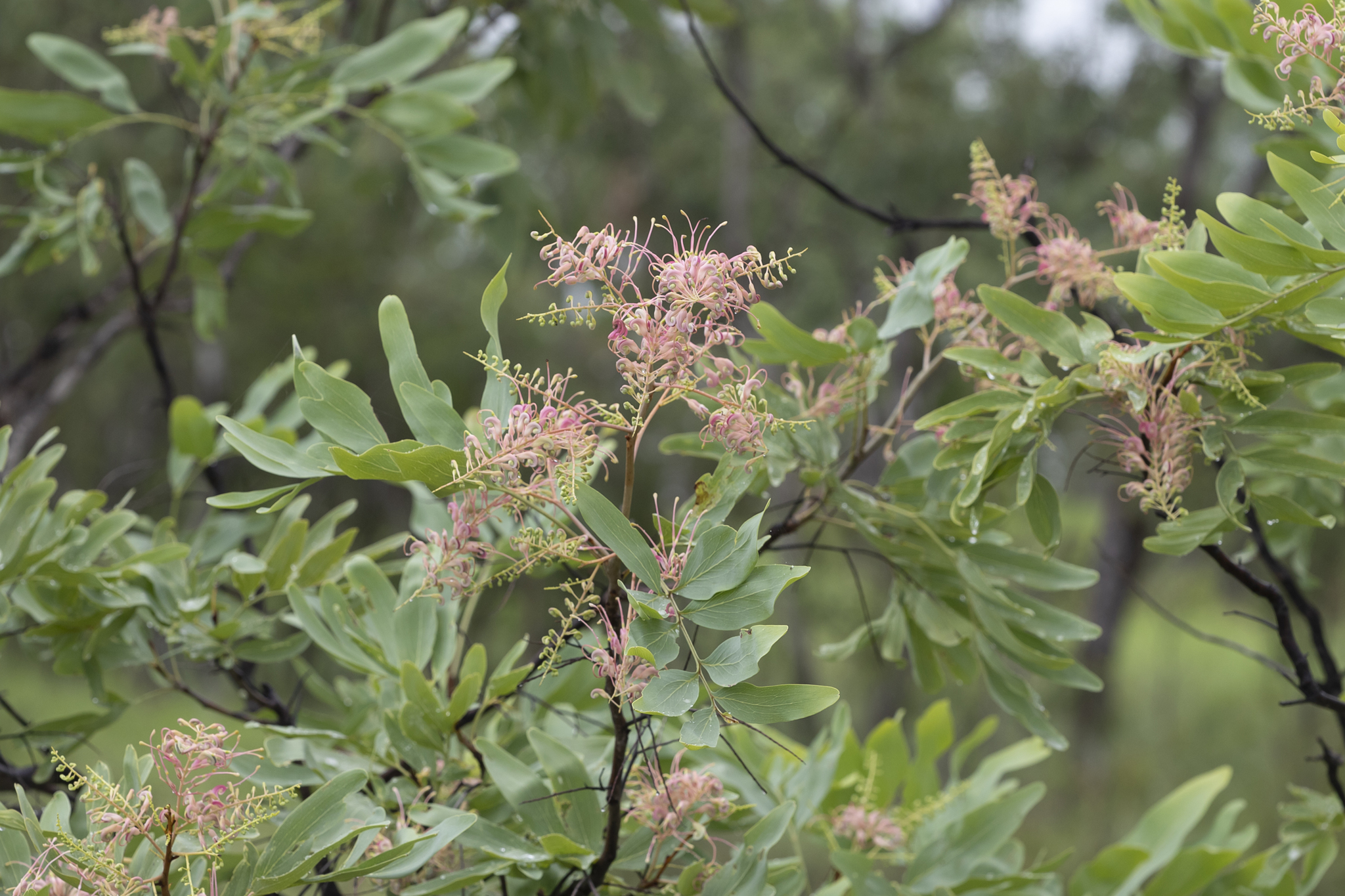
- Near Edith Falls

Conservation status
- Least Concern (IUCN 3.1)

Scientific classification
- Kingdom: Plantae
- Clade: Embryophytes
- Clade: Tracheophytes
- Clade: Spermatophytes
- Clade: Angiosperms
- Clade: Eudicots
- Order: Proteales
- Family: Proteaceae
- Genus: Grevillea
- Species: G. decurrens

Binomial name
- Grevillea decurrens Ewart

= Grevillea decurrens =

Species of shrub native to northern Australia

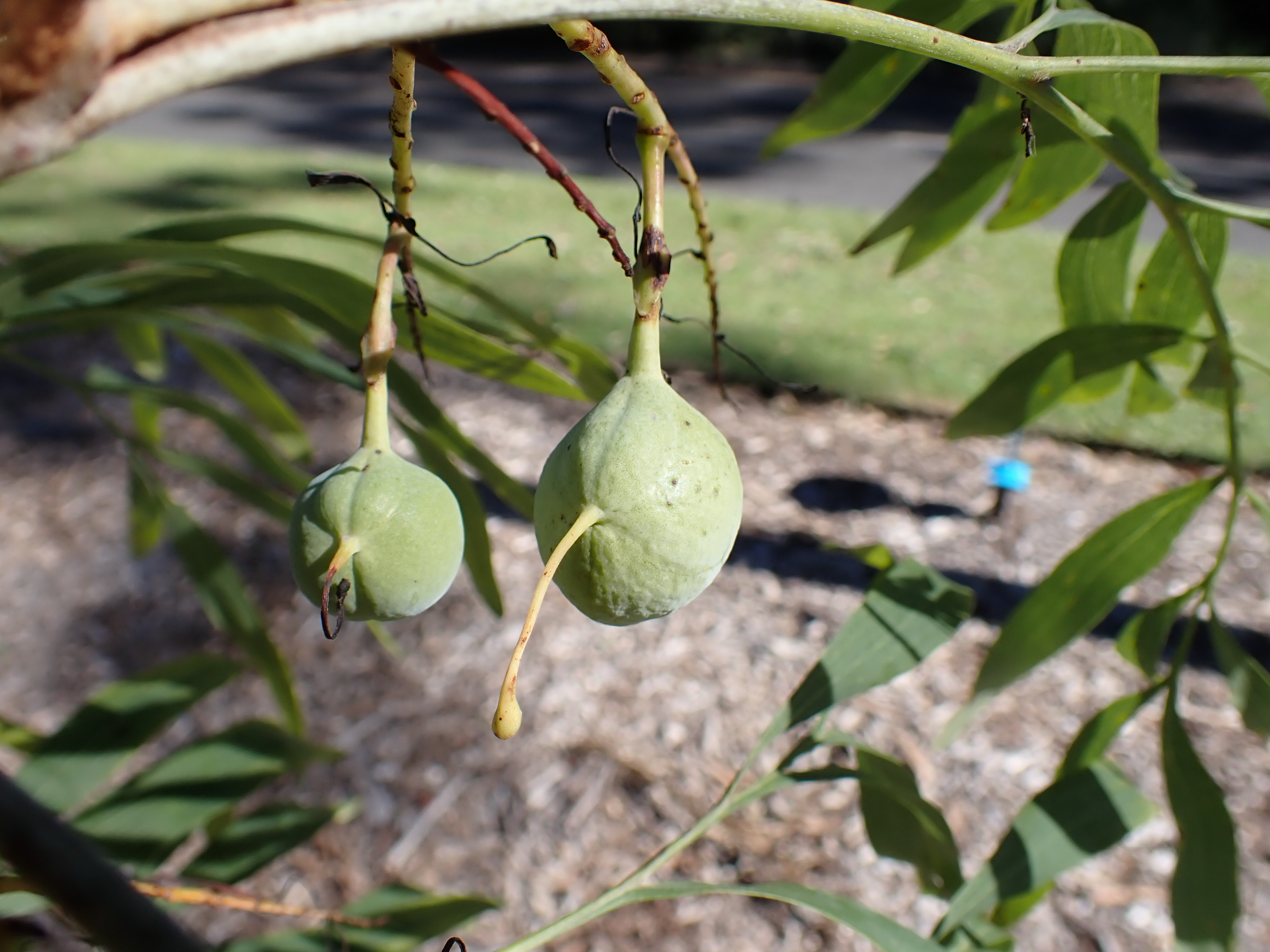
Fruit in Mount Coot-tha Botanic Gardens

Grevillea decurrens, also known as the clothes-peg tree, is a species of flowering plant in the family Proteaceae and is endemic to northern Australia. It is a shrub or tree with divided leaves, the lobes elliptic to egg-shaped with the narrower end towards the base, and conical groups of pink or cream-coloured flowers.

== Description ==
Grevillea decurrens is a shrub or tree that typically grows to a height of 2–4 m (6 ft 7 in – 13 ft 1 in). Its leaves are pinnatipartite with seven to thirteen elliptic to egg-shaped pliable lobes with the narrower end towards the base, 30–180 mm (1.2–7.1 in) long and 10–40 mm (0.39–1.57 in) wide. The flowers are arranged in groups with up to six conical to cylindrical branches, the flowers arranged on one side of a rachis 50–150 mm (2.0–5.9 in) long and opening from the base, each flower on a pedicel 5–7 mm (0.20–0.28 in) long. The flowers are pink or cream-coloured, sometimes with a pink tinge, the pistil 32–35 mm (1.3–1.4 in) long and glabrous. Flowering occurs from November to March and the fruit is a more or less spherical follicle 24–33 mm (0.94–1.30 in) in diameter.

== Taxonomy ==
Grevillea decurrens was first formally described in 1917 by Alfred James Ewart in The Flora of the Northern Territory from specimens collected by Walter Scott Campbell in 1911. The specific epithet (decurrens) means "decurrent".

== Distribution and habitat ==
This grevillea grows in open, tropical woodland in the Kimberley region of Western Australia and as far south as Derby, and from TimberCreek to Darwin including Melville Island and east to Arnhem Land in the Northern Territory.

== Conservation status ==
Grevillea decurrens is listed as least concern on the IUCN Red List of Threatened Species, as it is widely distributed and does not face any major threats, either currently or in the near future.
