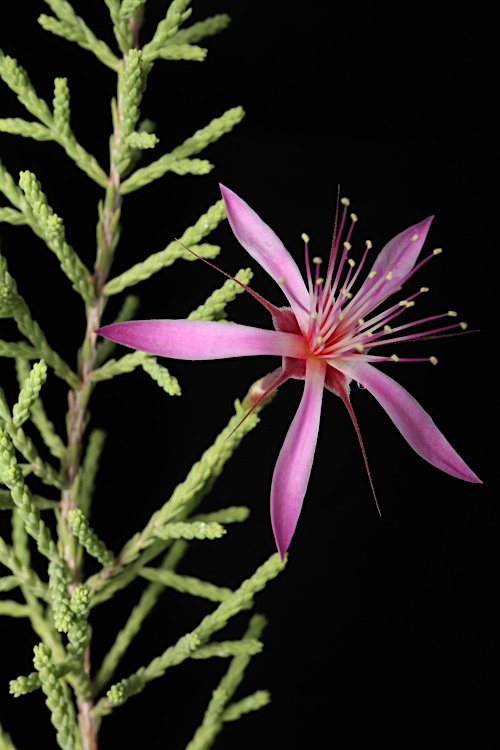
- In the Australian National Botanic Gardens

Conservation status
- Data Deficient (IUCN 3.1)

Scientific classification
- Kingdom: Plantae
- Clade: Tracheophytes
- Clade: Angiosperms
- Clade: Eudicots
- Clade: Rosids
- Order: Myrtales
- Family: Myrtaceae
- Genus: Calytrix
- Species: C. exstipulata

Binomial name
- Calytrix exstipulata DC.

Synonyms
- List: Calycothrix baueri Schauer; Calycothrix conferta (A.Cunn.) Schauer; Calycothrix cupressifolia (A.Rich.) Stapf; Calycothrix cupressoides (A.Rich.) Schauer nom. illeg.; Calycothrix microphylla Schauer nom. illeg.; Calythrix baueri Benth. nom. inval., pro syn.; Calythrix conferta A.Cunn. orth. var.; Calythrix cupressifolia A.Rich. orth. var.; Calythrix cupressoides A.Rich. orth. var.; Calythrix exstipulata DC. orth. var.; Calythrix interstans S.Moore orth. var.; Calythrix microphylla A.Cunn. orth. var.; Calythrix microphylla A.Cunn. var. microphylla orth. var.; Calythrix wickhamiana S.Moore orth. var.; Calytrhix cupressoides A.Rich. orth. var.; Calytrix conferta A.Cunn.; Calytrix cupressifolia A.Rich.; Calytrix cupressoides A.Rich. orth. var.; Calytrix interstans S.Moore; Calytrix microphylla A.Cunn. nom. illeg.; Calytrix microphylla A.Cunn. var. microphylla; Calytrix wickhamiana S.Moore

= Calytrix exstipulata =

Species of flowering plant

Calytrix exstipulata, commonly known as turkey bush, Kimberley heather, heather bush or pink fringe-myrtle, is a species of flowering plant in the myrtle family Myrtaceae and is endemic to northern Australia. It is an erect shrub with narrowly egg-shaped to elliptic leaves and clusters of dark red, pink and white flowers with mainly pink stamens.

== Description ==
Calytrix exstipulata is an erect shrub that typically grows to a height of up to 2 m (6 ft 7 in), rarely a tree to 4.5 m (15 ft), and has sessile narrowly egg-shaped to linear leaves 1–3.5 mm (0.039–0.138 in) long and 0.25–1 mm (0.0098–0.0394 in) wide. The flowers are arranged singly in leaf axils with bracteoles about 7 mm (0.28 in) long and joined for about 2/3 of their length. The floral tube is cylindrical, dark red and glabrous, usually with 10 ribs and 8–13 mm (0.31–0.51 in) long. The sepals are more or less round, dark red and 10–12 mm (0.39–0.47 in) with a fine awn about 8 mm (0.31 in) long. The petals are pink with a white base, about 10 mm (0.39 in) long and narrowly elliptic with about 30 pink stamens, white at the base.

== Taxonomy ==
Calytrix exstipulata was first formally described in 1828 by Augustin Pyramus de Candolle in his Prodromus Systematis Naturalis Regni Vegetabilis from specimens collected near the Gulf of Carpentaria. The specific epithet (exstipulata) means "completely without stipules".

== Distribution and habitat ==
Turkey bush is very common in the monsoon region of northern Australia and occurs from the Kimberley Region of Western Australia, through the northern half of the Northern Territory, and as far as Gregory Range in Queensland. It grows in a wide range of habitats including eucalyptus and cypress pine woodland and forest.
