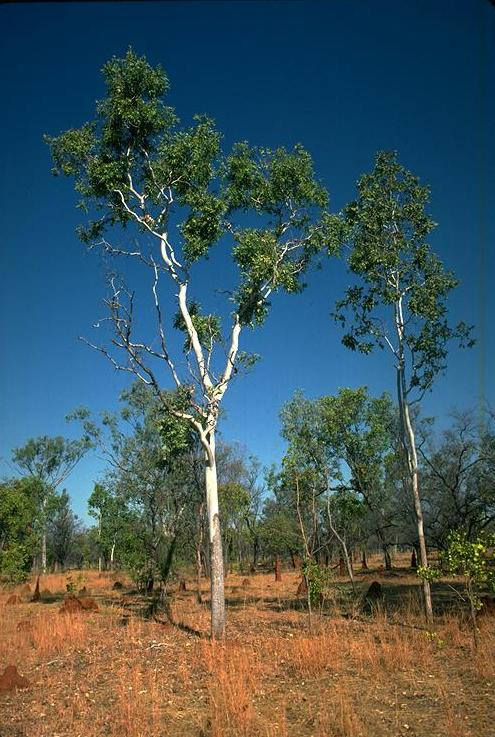

Scientific classification
- Kingdom: Plantae
- Clade: Embryophytes
- Clade: Tracheophytes
- Clade: Spermatophytes
- Clade: Angiosperms
- Clade: Eudicots
- Clade: Rosids
- Order: Myrtales
- Family: Myrtaceae
- Genus: Corymbia
- Species: C. confertiflora

Binomial name
- Corymbia confertiflora (Kippist) K.D.Hill & L.A.S.Johnson

Synonyms
- Eucalyptus confertiflora Kippist; Eucalyptus floribunda F.Muell.

= Corymbia confertiflora =

Broad-leaved carbeen

Species of plant

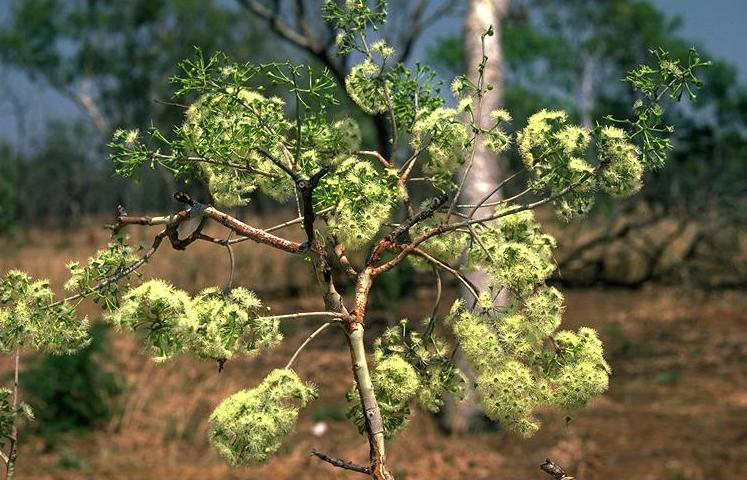
flower buds and flowers

Corymbia confertiflora, commonly known as broad-leaved carbeen or rough leaf cabbage gum, is a species of tree that is endemic to northern Australia. It has rough, tessellated bark near the base of the trunk, smooth white to pale grey bark above, a crown of both intermediate and adult leaves, large numbers of flower buds borne on leafless sections of branchlets in groups of seven, creamy white flowers and cylindrical to barrel-shaped or bell-shaped fruit.

== Description ==
Corymbia confertiflora is an often straggly or crooked tree that typically grows to a height of 3–18 m (9.8–59.1 ft) and forms a lignotuber. It has rough, tessellated dark grey bark near the base, then abruptly white to pale grey bark above, the smooth bark shed in thin flakes. The tree is usually deciduous in the dry season. Young plants and coppice regrowth have sessile round, heart-shaped or egg-shaped leaves that are 98–230 mm (3.9–9.1 in) long, 42–17 mm (1.65–0.67 in) wide and arranged in opposite pairs. The crown is composed of both intermediate and adult leaves that are the same shade of dull green on both sides, heart-shaped to broadly elliptical to egg-shaped, 60–160 mm (2.4–6.3 in) long, 25–103 mm (0.98–4.06 in) wide and more or less sessile or on a petiole 1–5 mm (0.039–0.197 in) long. The flower buds are arranged in leaf axils on leafless parts of branchlets on a much-branched peduncle that is up to 20 mm (0.79 in) long. The buds are arranged in groups of seven or more on each branch of the peduncle, on pedicels 7–30 mm (0.28–1.18 in) long. Mature buds are pear-shaped, 4–7 mm (0.16–0.28 in) long and 4–5 mm (0.16–0.20 in) wide with a rounded, sometimes pointed operculum. Flowering occurs from July to December and the flowers are creamy white. The fruit is a woody cylindrical, barrel-shaped or bell-shaped capsule 7–16 mm (0.28–0.63 in) long and 6–12 mm (0.24–0.47 in) wide and thin-walled with the valves enclosed in the fruit.

== Taxonomy and naming ==
The broad-leaved carbeen was first formally described in an 1859 manuscript by Ferdinand von Mueller who gave it the name Eucalyptus floribunda. The name E. floribunda was already in use (now Angophora floribunda) and when Richard Kippist entered Mueller's description in the Journal of the Proceedings of the Linnean Society, Botany, he changed the name to E. confertiflora. Under the rules of botanical nomenclature, the name is therefore attributed to Kippist, even though Mueller supplied the description. In 1995 Kenneth Hill and Lawrence Alexander Sidney Johnson changed the name to Corymbia confertiflora in the journal Telopea. The specific epithet (confertiflora) is derived from the Latin confertus meaning "crowded" and -florus meaning "-flowered", referring to the crowded flowers.

== Distribution and habitat ==
Corymbia confertiflora is widespread in northern Australia and occurs from the Kimberley region of Western Australia, through the Top End of the Northern Territory and south-eastern Arnhem Land, then near-coastal areas around the Gulf of Carpentaria to near Townsville and the Kennedy River in Queensland. It grows in open woodland and forest on plains and levees, and is often associated with limestone.

== Traditional ecological knowledge ==
Corymbia confertiflora is named 'boonbany' by the Gija people of the East Kimberley region of north-western Australia.

== See also ==
- List of Corymbia species
