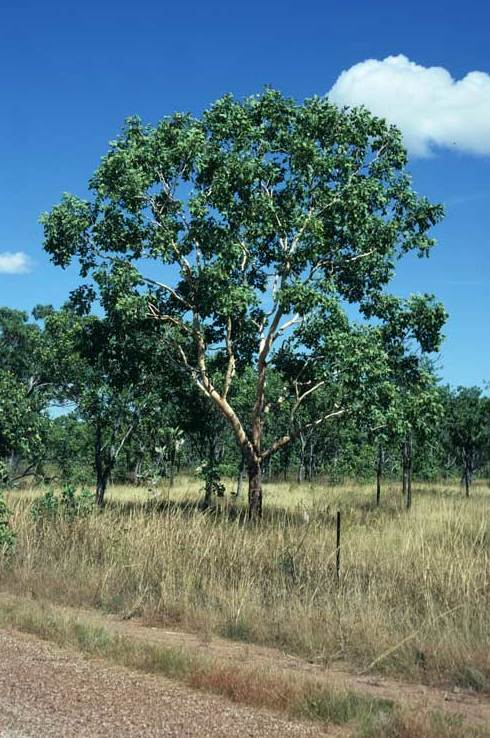
- Corymbia latifolia near the road to Katherine Gorge

Scientific classification
- Kingdom: Plantae
- Clade: Embryophytes
- Clade: Tracheophytes
- Clade: Spermatophytes
- Clade: Angiosperms
- Clade: Eudicots
- Clade: Rosids
- Order: Myrtales
- Family: Myrtaceae
- Genus: Corymbia
- Species: C. latifolia

Binomial name
- Corymbia latifolia (F.Muell.) K.D.Hill & L.A.S.Johnson

Synonyms
- Eucalyptus latifolia F.Muell.

= Corymbia latifolia =

Round-leaved bloodwood

Species of plant

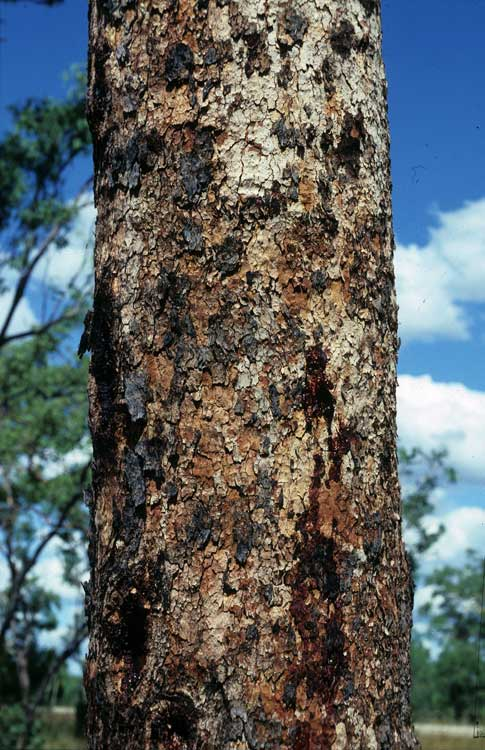
bark

Corymbia latifolia, commonly known as round-leaved bloodwood, round leaf bloodwood, wubam and other names in indigenous languages, is a species of tree that is endemic to northern Australia. It has thin, rough bark over part or all of the trunk, smooth bark above, triangular or broadly egg-shaped adult leaves, flower buds in groups of seven, creamy white flowers and urn-shaped fruit.

== Description ==
Corymbia latifolia typically grows to a height of 5 to 15 metres (16 to 49 ft) with thin, rough, scaly or flaky to tessellated bark on part or all of the trunk, smooth white to cream-coloured bark above. Yount plants and coppice regrowth have dull green, broadly egg-shaped to round leaves that are 85–225 mm (3.3–8.9 in) long, 80–140 mm (3.1–5.5 in) wide and petiolate. Adult leaves are arranged alternately, dull green, triangular to broadly egg-shaped or elliptical, 70–165 mm (2.8–6.5 in) long and 40–123 mm (1.6–4.8 in) wide on a petiole 20–50 mm (0.79–1.97 in) long. The flowers buds are arranged on the ends of branchlets on a thin, branched peduncle 2–22 mm (0.079–0.866 in) long, each branch of the peduncle with seven buds on pedicels 2–13 mm (0.079–0.512 in) long. Mature buds are smooth and glossy, oval, pear-shaped or more or less spherical, 5–6 mm (0.20–0.24 in) long and 3–6 mm (0.12–0.24 in) wide with a rounded operculum. Flowering occurs between November and March and the flowers are creamy white.

== Taxonomy and naming ==
Round-leaved bloodwood was first formally described in 1859 by Ferdinand von Mueller in Journal of the Proceedings of the Linnean Society, Botany and was given the name Eucalyptus latifolia. In 1995, Ken Hill and Lawrie Johnson changed the name to Corymbia latifolia.

Indigenous Australians of the Yangman peoples know the plant as wubam or dolyan, the Ngarinyman know it as jadburru, the Warray as warrajan and the Wagiman as jimarnin.

== Distribution and habitat ==
Corymbia latifolia is found on rocky slopes, plateaus and hills growing in sandy soils and has a range across the north of Australia extending from the tip of Cape York Peninsula in Queensland through the Top End and off-shore islands of the Northern Territory to the Kimberley region of Western Australia. There are also scattered populations in Papua New Guinea and on some Torres Strait Islands. It is sometimes the dominant species in low-lying areas in wetter part of the Northern Territory and the Kimberley.

== See also ==
- List of Corymbia species
