= Beeron National Park =

National park in Australia

- IUCN category II (national park)
- Location within Queensland
- Location: Queensland
- Nearest city: Mundubbera
- Coordinates: 26°1′2″S 151°18′0″E
- Area: 70.5 km^{2} (27.2 sq mi)
- Established: 2009
- Governing body: Queensland Parks and Wildlife Service

Beeron National Park is a national park at Beeron in the Wide Bay–Burnett region of Queensland, Australia. The 7050-hectare park preserves plant species of high conservation value. It was formerly known as Beeron Holding or "Rocky" paddock.

It is part of both the North Burnett Region and South Burnett Region local government areas and the Brigalow Belt bioregion. The park lies within the catchment area of the Boyne River, a tributary of the Burnett River.

Beeron National Park is home to six endemic species and three plants with conservation significance.

In 2010, an extra 7,000 hectares significantly extended the size of the park. The addition was made possible by the cooperation of two mining companies who relinquished their mining permits.

South and west of the national park is Allies Creek State Forest. It is undeveloped with no visitor facilities.

== Regional Ecosystems ==
The park contains 3 regional ecosystems with an "Of Concern" Biodiversity Status:

- 11.12.3 - Eucalyptus crebra, E. tereticornis, Angophora leiocarpa woodland on igneous rocks

especially granite

- 11.12.5 - Corymbia spp., Lysicarpus angustifolius, Eucalyptus crebra, E. cloeziana woodland on igneous rocks (granite)
- 11.12.20 - Corymbia spp., Eucalyptus baileyana, E. dura, E. exserta woodland on igneous rocks

== Threatened Species ==
The national park contains 11 threatened native flora species which include:

- Acacia eremophiloides
- Acacia grandifolia
- Acacia porcata
- Bertya granitica
- Androcalva beeronensis (syn. Commersonia beeronensis)
- Corymbia petalophylla (syn. Blakella petalophylla)
- Hibbertia monticola
- Kunzea flavescens
- Macrozamia crassifolia
- Newcastelia velutina
- Notelaea pungens

The national park contains 1 threatened native fauna species:

- Falco hypoleucos

== See also ==
- Protected areas of Queensland
