= Corymbia petalophylla =

Scientific classification
- Kingdom: Plantae
- Clade: Embryophytes
- Clade: Tracheophytes
- Clade: Spermatophytes
- Clade: Angiosperms
- Clade: Eudicots
- Clade: Rosids
- Order: Myrtales
- Family: Myrtaceae
- Genus: Corymbia
- Species: C. petalophylla

Binomial name
- Corymbia petalophylla (Brooker & A.R.Bean) K.D.Hill & L.A.S.Johnson

Synonyms
- Eucalyptus petalophylla Brooker & A.R.Bean

Species of plant

Corymbia petalophylla is a species of tree that is endemic to Queensland. It has rough, tessellated bark on the trunk and branches, lance-shaped or curved adult leaves, flower buds in groups of seven, white flowers and barrel-shaped, urn-shaped or shortened spherical fruit.

== Description ==
Corymbia petalophylla is a tree that typically grows to a height of 15 m (49 ft) and forms a lignotuber. It has thick, rough, yellowish, tessellated and flaky bark on the trunk and branches, smooth bark only on the thinnest branches. Young plants and coppice regrowth have egg-shaped leaves that are 75–145 mm (3.0–5.7 in) long and 40–100 mm (1.6–3.9 in) wide. Adult leaves are the same shade of dull green on both sides, lance-shaped or curved, 80–190 mm (3.1–7.5 in) long and 15–45 mm (0.59–1.77 in) wide, tapering to a petiole 10–38 mm (0.39–1.50 in) long. The flower buds are arranged on the ends of branchlets on a branched peduncle 7–28 mm (0.28–1.10 in) long, each branch of the peduncle with seven buds on pedicels 1–7 mm (0.039–0.276 in) long. Mature buds are oval, 7–8 mm (0.28–0.31 in) long and 4–5 mm (0.16–0.20 in) wide with an operculum that is rounded with a central knob or conical. Flowering occurs from July to September and the flowers are white. The fruit is a woody barrel-shaped, urn-shaped or shortened spherical capsule 8–14 mm (0.31–0.55 in) long and 8–12 mm (0.31–0.47 in) wide with the valves enclosed in the fruit.

== Taxonomy and naming ==
This bloodwood was first formally described in 1991 by Ian Brooker and Anthony Bean who gave it the name Eucalyptus petalophylla and published the description in the journal Austrobaileya. In 1995 Ken Hill and Lawrie Johnson changed the name to Corymbia petalophylla. The specific epithet (petalophylla) is from Greek words meaning "broad" and "leaf", referring to the broad juvenile leaves.

== Distribution and habitat ==
Corymbia petalophylla grows with C. trachyphloia, C. watsoniana and Eucalyptus baileyana, in soil derived from granite and occurs in the Burnett district of south-eastern Queensland.

== Conservation status ==
This eucalypt is classified as "not listed" under the Queensland Government Nature Conservation Act 1992.

== See also ==
- List of Corymbia species
