= Washpool National Park =

National park in New South Wales, Australia

- IUCN category II (national park)
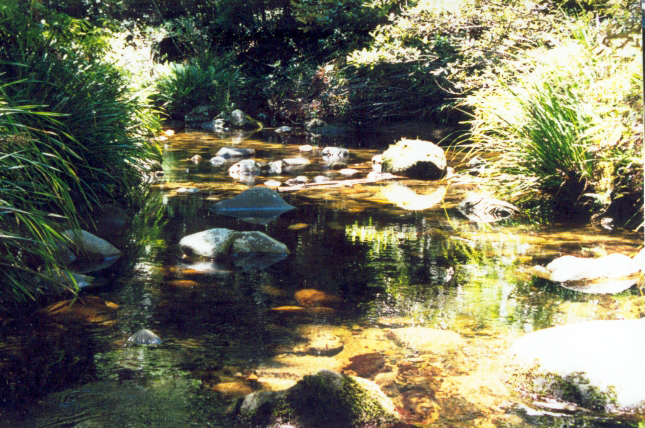
- Washpool River, within the national park

- Location within New South Wales
- Location: New South Wales
- Nearest city: Grafton
- Coordinates: 29°20′49″S 152°19′58″E
- Area: 587 km^{2} (227 sq mi)
- Established: April 1983
- Governing body: NSW National Parks & Wildlife Service
- Website: Official website

The Washpool National Park is a protected national park located in the New England region of New South Wales, Australia. The 58,678-hectare (145,000-acre) park is situated approximately 520 kilometres (320 mi) north of Sydney, inland from Grafton, and is one of the largest uncut forests in New South Wales. The park has two campgrounds and is managed by the NSW National Parks and Wildlife Service. It was established in 1983 to preserve the significant plant and animal populations found in the Washpool and Gibraltar Range forests. At the same time, it is part of the Gondwana Rainforest of Australia, which is famous for its ancient subtropical and temperate rainforests, rich biodiversity, and ecological significance, and is listed as a World Heritage Site by UNESCO.

== Geography and location ==
Located in the rugged landscape of the Great Dividing Range in New South Wales, Washpool National Park forms a continuous conservation corridor with the Gibraltar Ranges National Parks, enhancing the ecological connectivity of the region. The Gwydir Highway runs through Washpool National Park and the Gibraltar Ranges National Parks, connecting the inland plateau with the coastal area.

As a result of millions of years of geological activity, the park is characterized by dense forests, steep cliffs, and deep river valleys. The Dandara Granite Plateau reaches the western boundary of the park when The Demon Fault, a major geological feature, drops abruptly into the Cooraldooral Creek Valley.

Dandahra, Coombadjha, and Grassy Creeks flow through the park, forming waterfalls and supporting lush riparian rainforests. Flora, including some of the largest remaining subtropical rainforests in Australia, benefit from the sheltered gullies and high elevation plateaus, and these river systems also maintain the diversity of the park's ecosystems.

== Climate ==
The climate of Washpool National Park is mild, but varies greatly due to differences in altitude. The average elevation of the terrain is 704 metres. Average summer temperatures range between 14 °C and 26 °C, and winter temperatures between 2 °C and 15 °C. The high-altitude areas of the Central Plateau and the Great Escarpment receive more than 2,000 mm of rainfall per year, while the lower western areas receive about 1,200 mm of rainfall per year. The high rainfall on the eastern slopes creates dense rainforests, while the conditions in the western areas are drier. The summer months (November to March) have abundant rainfall, often accompanied by afternoon thunderstorms, heavy rains, and occasional hail. In the winter months (June to August), the region receives widespread but less intense rainfall.

== History ==
=== Indigenous history ===
Washpool National Park forms part of the traditional lands of the Bundjalung, Gumbaynggirr, and Ngarrabul Aboriginal peoples, who have inhabited and managed the area for thousands of years. The area provides a wealth of resources, including food, medicinal plants, and materials for making tools and shelter. Many sites of cultural and spiritual significance remain within the park, although many of these sites are not well documented. The rainforest and river systems are integral to the traditional way of life and the land still holds deep significance for Aboriginal groups.

=== European settlement and land use ===
Around 1850, European settlers began grazing in the Washpool area, which was originally a livestock passage between the highlands and the coast. The discovery of tin and gold in 1852 led to a wave of miners, greatly increasing human activity in the area. As mining expanded, commercial logging followed, with redwood, horsetail, and other valuable hardwoods being harvested in large quantities. Logging continued into the 20th century, particularly in the Washpool and Cangai areas, until the 1980s, when conservation concerns led to the protection of these forests.

=== Creation of the national park ===
The movement to protect the Washpool Rainforest gained momentum in the late 20th century. In 1999 the park was expanded to include areas that had previously been threatened with logging, which a court injunction stopped in 1990. Washpool National Park was gazetted as part of a wider conservation effort to protect Australia's dwindling subtropical and temperate rainforests.

=== World Heritage status ===
The Park is part of the Washpool and Gibraltar Range area of the World Heritage Site Gondwana Rainforests of Australia, inscribed in 1986 and added to the Australian National Heritage List in 2007. The park contains the oldest rainforest ecosystems on Earth, with plant lineages dating back more than 100 million years. These ancient forests provide important refuges for rare and endemic species and provide valuable insights into climate resilience and evolutionary history.

== Ecology and biodiversity ==
The national park's natural habitat is full of diversity of plants, mammals, amphibians, reptiles, and birds.

=== Flora ===
Washpool National Park is home to a diversity of plants, making it one of the most important vegetation reserves in New South Wales. The park contains one of the largest uncut sclerophyllous forests in the state, as well as extensive rainforest ecosystems. One of its most notable features is its warm temperate rainforest, which includes the world's largest known extensive cocoa (Ceratopetalum apetalum) rainforest. Other key vegetation types include eucalyptus-dominated open forests, where species such as Gibraltar ash (Eucalyptus olida), giant black gum (Eucalyptus globulus), and coniferous bark (Eucalyptus planchoniana) thrive.

Granite outcrop communities support unique plant species adapted to shallow soils and extreme weather conditions, while riparian rainforests flourish along creeks and rivers. More than 878 species of vascular plants have been recorded in the park, representing 138 plant families. Many species are rare or endangered, and 81 are listed as of conservation significance. Introduced plant species remain rare, accounting for only 2% of the park's total flora, highlighting its pristine ecological conditions.

=== Fauna ===
Washpool National Park provides habitat for a wide variety of wildlife, including several endangered and endemic species. Mammals in the park include the spotted-tailed quoll (Dasyurus maculatus), greater glider (Petauroides volans), and koala (Phascolarctos cinereus). The park is also a haven for birds, hosting superb lyrebird (Menura novaehollandiae), rufous scrubbird (Atrichornis rufescens), as well as various parrots and common honeyeaters.

Reptiles and amphibians are also abundant, including the eastern water dragon (Intellagama lesueurii) and the endangered Fleay's barred frog (Mixophyes fleayi). The park's pristine rivers and creeks support aquatic species, such as the critically endangered eastern freshwater cod (Maccullochella ikei), which are highly dependent on the park's clean waterways.

== Conservation and management ==
As a World Heritage-listed site, Washpool National Park is a priority conservation area in Australia. Park management focuses on fire control, invasive species management, and habitat protection. Fire-sensitive ecosystems, especially rainforests and wet sclerophyllous forests, require controlled burning methods to prevent high-intensity wildfires. Efforts to eradicate feral pigs, goats, and cattle are ongoing, as these animals threaten local flora and fauna. In addition, climate change poses long-term risks, with rising temperatures and changes in rainfall patterns that could affect the park's biodiversity and ecosystem stability.

Ecological research is ongoing in the park to monitor vegetation changes, climate impacts, and species population trends. These protective measures ensure that Washpool National Park remains a pristine reserve of biodiversity and a valuable ecological resource for future generations.

== See also ==
- Protected areas of New South Wales
- High Conservation Value Old Growth forest
- Washpool National Park travel guide from Wikivoyage
