= K. flavescens =

K. flavescens may refer to:

- Kinosternon flavescens, a mud turtle
- Kunzea flavescens, a dicotyledon plant
