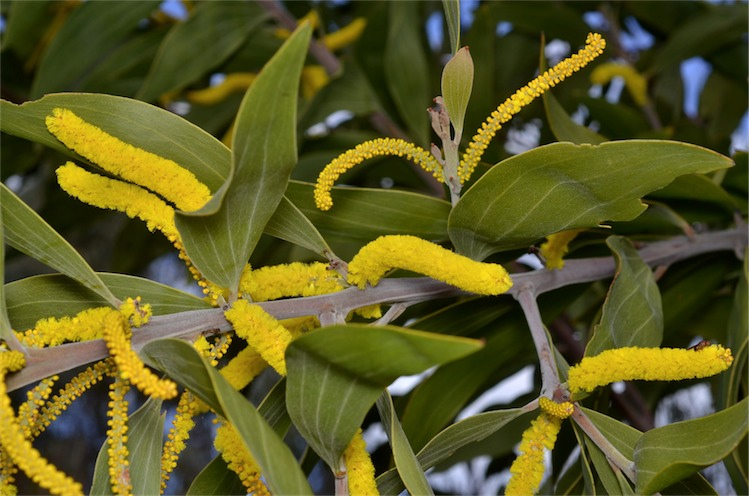

Conservation status
- Vulnerable (EPBC Act)

Scientific classification
- Kingdom: Plantae
- Clade: Tracheophytes
- Clade: Angiosperms
- Clade: Eudicots
- Clade: Rosids
- Order: Fabales
- Family: Fabaceae
- Subfamily: Caesalpinioideae
- Clade: Mimosoid clade
- Genus: Acacia
- Species: A. grandifolia

Binomial name
- Acacia grandifolia Pedley
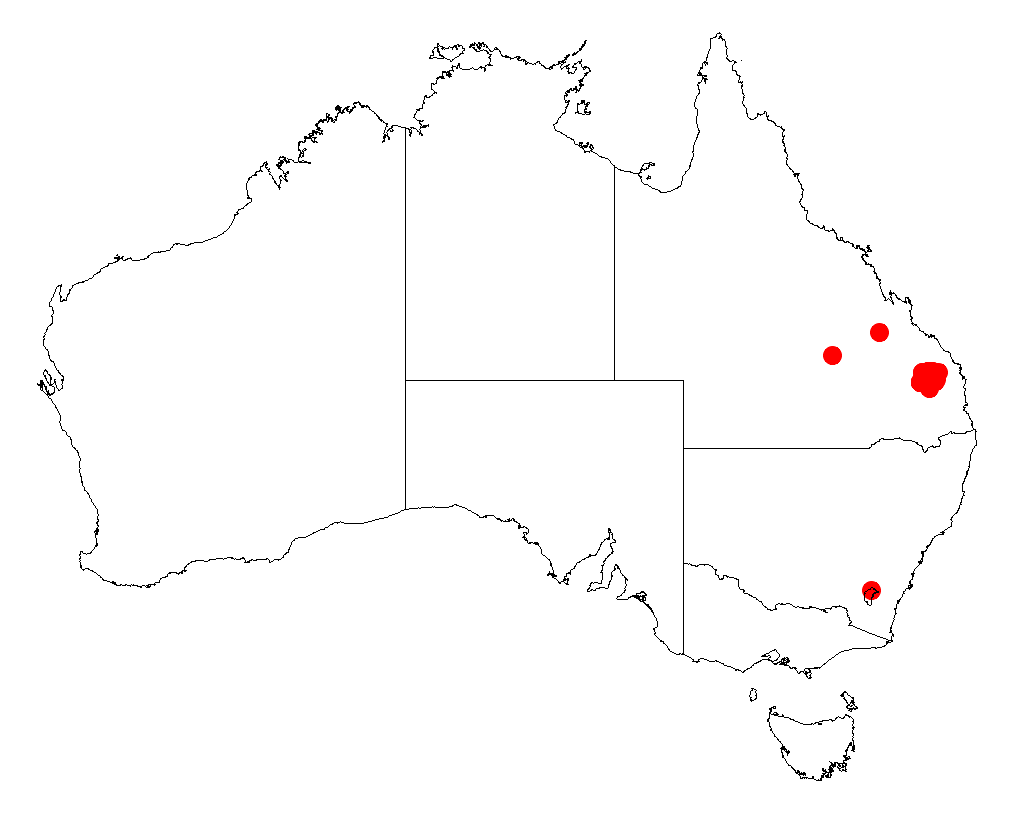
- Occurrence data from AVH

Synonyms
- Racosperma grandifolium (Pedley) Pedley

= Acacia grandifolia =

Species of legume

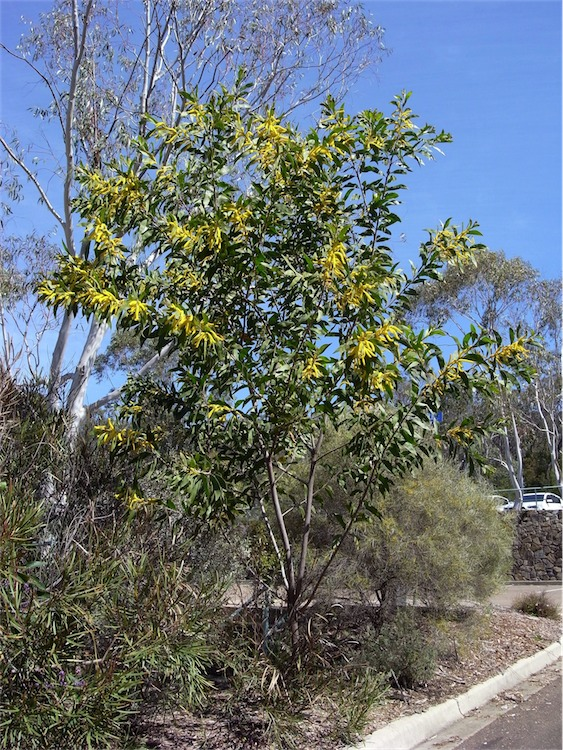
Habit in the Australian National Botanic Gardens

Acacia grandifolia is a species of flowering plant in the family Fabaceae and is endemic to Queensland, Australia. It is a tree with furrowed, dark brown bark, stiff, leathery elliptic phyllodes, spikes of golden yellow flowers and hairy pods.

== Description ==
Acacia grandifolia is a tree that typically grows to a height of up to 8 m (26 ft) and has dark brown, furrowed bark. Its branchlets are stout, very acutely angular, and densely covered with velvety grey hairs. The phyllodes are elliptic, more or less straight, 75–150 mm (3.0–5.9 in) long, 20–50 mm (0.79–1.97 in) wide and leathery with three or four prominent, often yellowish, hairy main veins. Flowering occurs in September and the pods are flattened terete, 60–80 mm (2.4–3.1 in) long and 5–6 mm (0.20–0.24 in) wide, covered with woolly hairs and slightly constricted between, but strongly raised over the seeds. The seeds are 4–5 mm (0.16–0.20 in) long.

== Taxonomy ==
Acacia grandifolia was first formally described in 1978 by Leslie Pedley in the journal Austrobaileya from specimens he collected 34 mi (55 km) south of Mundubbera in 1969. The specific epithet (grandifolia) means 'large-leaved'.

== Distribution ==
This species of wattle is endemic to two small areas in the Burnett District of south east Queensland where it often grows amongst outcrops of sandstone, in sandy or in shallow, stony soils that have derived from basalt. It is found in hilly terrain of differing slopes and aspects, in gullies, on plains and on hill crests. and grows well in disturbed ground and along roadsides. It occurs in dense stands or as part of gun-tree woodland communities along with Eucalyptus crebra, Corymbia citriodora, Corymbia trachyphloia and Eucalyptus exserta.

== Conservation Status ==
Acacia grandifolia is listed as "vulnerable under the Australian Government Environment Protection and Biodiversity Conservation Act 1999 and as "near-threatened" under the Queensland Government Nature Conservation Act 1992.

== See also ==
- List of Acacia species
