= Messmate =

Messmate is a common name for a group of species of tree in the plant genus Eucalyptus, all of which have rough bark. The name is of uncertain origin.

Species commonly known as "messmate" include:

- E. acmenoides (yellow messmate)
- E. cloeziana (messmate, Gympie messmate, Queensland messmate, yellow messmate)
- E. exserta (messmate, yellow messmate)
- E. macta (red messmate)
- E. obliqua (messmate, messmate stringybark)
- E. resinifera (red messmate)
- E. robertsonii (messmate, New South Wales messmate)
- E. robusta (swamp messmate)
- E. tetradonta (messmate)
