= Beeron =

Beeron may refer to:

- Beeron, Queensland, a locality in the North Burnett Region, Queensland, Australia
  - Beeron National Park, a national park in Beeron
