= Acacia porcata =

Conservation status
- Endangered (EPBC Act)
- Endangered (NCA)

Scientific classification
- Kingdom: Plantae
- Clade: Tracheophytes
- Clade: Angiosperms
- Clade: Eudicots
- Clade: Rosids
- Order: Fabales
- Family: Fabaceae
- Subfamily: Caesalpinioideae
- Clade: Mimosoid clade
- Genus: Acacia
- Species: A. porcata

Binomial name
- Acacia porcata P.I.Forst.

Species of legume

Acacia porcata is a species of wattle found only in one location in Central Queensland. It is an endangered species.

== Description ==
Acacia porcata is endemic to the Mundubbera Shire, Beeron National Park, and it grows in mountainous regions with lots of direct sunlight, as well as growing in eucalypt woodlands, provided its access to sunlight is not blocked by other plants. The plant is often found on granite substrate, as well as on soils with low acidity and high organic content. The area where it was located previously hosted many grazing animals, but was gradually taken over by eucalyptus plants.

It grows up to 0.5 metres (1.6 ft) tall, with resin and hairs covering its branches. Its phyllodes are olive-green, sticky, cylindrical, and covered in white hairs. Flowers that germinate come in clusters of 35 to 40 yellow round flowers. Its closest relative is Acacia longipedunculata.

The plant grows during the dry season. From August to late September, the flowers of the plant bloom, which grows sticky black seeds covered in a white aril from November to December. The seeds grow in pods. Most seeds drop close to the parent plant, but the aril has been known to entice ants to disperse the seeds elsewhere. Left undisturbed, its average lifespan is ten years.

Acacia porcata is an endangered species, declared so after the Environment Protection and Biodiversity Conservation Act 1999, due to fires killing it (since it cannot regenerate after fires), invasive species, and inbreeding depression from its small population. In 2001, nine groups of A. porcata growths were found in the region, with a total population of 1177.

The plant was first described in 1990 by Paul Irwin Forster.

== See also ==
- List of Acacia species
