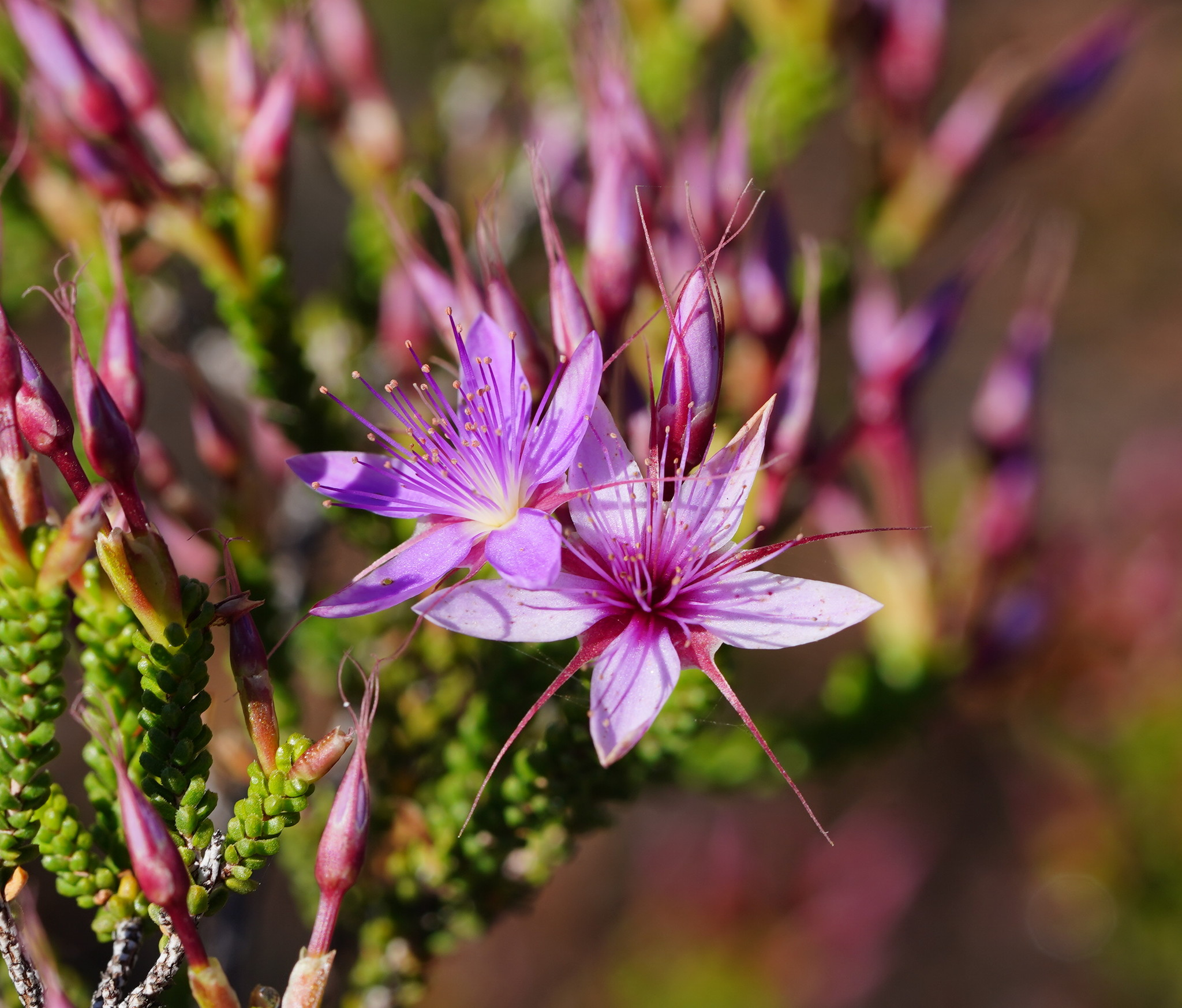
- In White Mountains National Park

Scientific classification
- Kingdom: Plantae
- Clade: Tracheophytes
- Clade: Angiosperms
- Clade: Eudicots
- Clade: Rosids
- Order: Myrtales
- Family: Myrtaceae
- Genus: Calytrix
- Species: C. microcoma

Binomial name
- Calytrix microcoma Craven

= Calytrix microcoma =

Species of flowering plant

Calytrix microcoma, commonly known is turkey bush, is a species of flowering plant in the myrtle family Myrtaceae and is endemic to Queensland. It is a mostly glabrous shrub with egg-shaped to linear leaves and mauve, pinkish purple or plum purple flowers, and about 30 to 50 stamens in several rows.

== Description ==
Calytrix microcoma is a mostly glabrous shrub that typically grows to a height of up to 1.5 m (4 ft 11 in). Its leaves are egg-shaped to linear, 1–4 mm (0.039–0.157 in) long, 0.80–1.25 mm (0.031–0.049 in) wide and sessile or on a petiole up to 0.3 mm (0.012 in) long. There are stipules up to 0.4 mm (0.016 in) long at the base of the petiole. The flowers are borne singly or in small groups on a peduncle 4.5–7.5 mm (0.18–0.30 in) long with egg-shaped lobes 2.5–3.75 mm (0.098–0.148 in) long. The floral tube is partly free from the style, 11–14 mm (0.43–0.55 in) and has 10 ribs. The sepals are fused at the base, with more or less round to egg-shaped lobes 3–5 mm (0.12–0.20 in) long and 2.75–5.0 mm (0.108–0.197 in) long, with an awn long up to 17 mm (0.67 in) long. The petals are mauve, pinkish purple or plum purple, narrowly elliptic, 10.5–11.0 mm (0.41–0.43 in) long and 3.5–4.0 mm (0.14–0.16 in) wide, and there are about 30 to 50 stamens in two rows. Flowering occurs from July to October.

== Taxonomy ==
Calytrix microcoma was first formally described in 1987 by Lyndley Craven in the journal Brunonia from specimens collected in 32 km (20 mi) east of Barcaldine by Nancy Tyson Burbidge in 1956. The specific epithet (microcoma) is a reference to hair-like bodies at the tip of the floral tube.

== Distribution and habitat ==
Turkey bush grows on sandy soil in an ironbark-poplar box-spinifex community, and in sandy loam in Eucalyptus similis woodland, from the Torrens Creek-Pentland district to the Jericho-Yalleroi district.

== Conservation status ==
Calytrix microcoma is listed as of "least concern" under the Queensland Government Nature Conservation Act 1992.
