= Bertya granitica =

Conservation status
- Endangered (EPBC Act)

Scientific classification
- Kingdom: Plantae
- Clade: Tracheophytes
- Clade: Angiosperms
- Clade: Eudicots
- Clade: Rosids
- Order: Malpighiales
- Family: Euphorbiaceae
- Genus: Bertya
- Species: B. granitica

Binomial name
- Bertya granitica Halford & R.J.F.Hend.
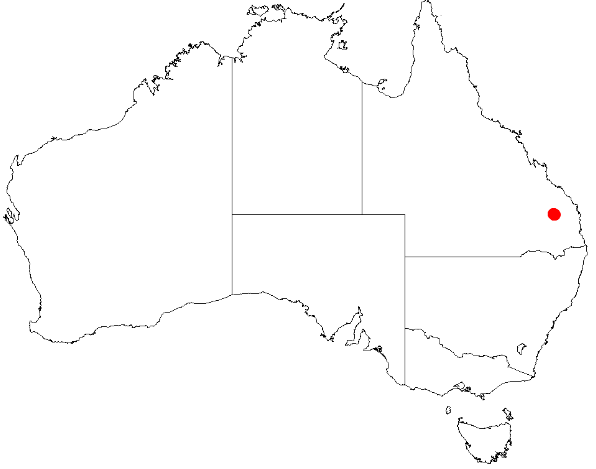
- Occurrence data from the Australasian Virtual Herbarium

Species of flowering plant

Bertya granitica is a species of flowering plant in the family Euphorbiaceae and is endemic to Queensland. It is a shrub with many branches, linear leaves, flowers borne singly in leaf axils or on the ends of branches, and narrowly elliptic capsules with a light brown seed.

== Description ==
Bertya granitica is usually a monoecious shrub that typically grows to a height of up to 1 m (3 ft 3 in) and has many branches. Its leaves are linear, 20–45 mm (0.79–1.77 in) long and 1.3–3 mm (0.051–0.118 in) wide on a petiole 0.5–1.2 mm (0.020–0.047 in) long, with the edges curved under. The upper surface of the leaves is bright green with a few star-shaped hairs, and the lower surface is white and densely covered with star-shaped hairs. The flowers are usually borne singly in leaf axils on a peduncle 0.3–1.5 mm (0.012–0.059 in) long. There are three to seven narrowly egg-shaped or egg-shaped bracts 1.9–2.8 mm (0.075–0.110 in) long and 0.6–1.5 mm (0.024–0.059 in) wide. Male flowers are sessile with five elliptic to oblong sepal lobes 3.4–4.5 mm (0.13–0.18 in) long and 2–3 mm (0.079–0.118 in) wide and 40 to 50 stamens. Female flowers are sessile, the five sepal lobes yellow-green, elliptic or oblong, 3–5 mm (0.12–0.20 in) long and 1.7–3.0 mm (0.067–0.118 in) wide. Female flowers have rudimentary petals, the ovary is glabrous, and the style is 0.5–1.0 mm (0.020–0.039 in) long with three spreading red limbs 2.8–4.5 mm (0.11–0.18 in) long, each with three or four lobes 1.0–3.3 mm (0.039–0.130 in) long. Flowering has been recorded in August and September, and the fruit is an oval capsule, 8.1–9.0 mm (0.32–0.35 in) long and 4.5–5.0 mm (0.18–0.20 in) wide with a single oblong, brown seed 6.5–6.7 mm (0.26–0.26 in) long and 3.6–3.7 mm (0.14–0.15 in) wide with a creamy-white caruncle.

== Taxonomy ==
Bertya granitica was first formally described in 2002 by David Halford and Rodney John Francis Henderson in the journal Austrobaileya from specimens collected in the Beeron Holding in 1999. The specific epithet (granitica) refers to the exposed granite rock outcrops where this species is found.

== Distribution and habitat ==
This species of Bertya is only known from Beeron National Park in south-east Queensland, where it grows in shallow soil on exposed granite outcrops in open forest or woodland.

== Conservation status ==
Bertya gravitica is listed as "endangered" under the Queensland Government Nature Conservation Act 1992 and the Australian Government Environment Protection and Biodiversity Conservation Act 1999. The main threat to the species is inappropriate fire regimes.
