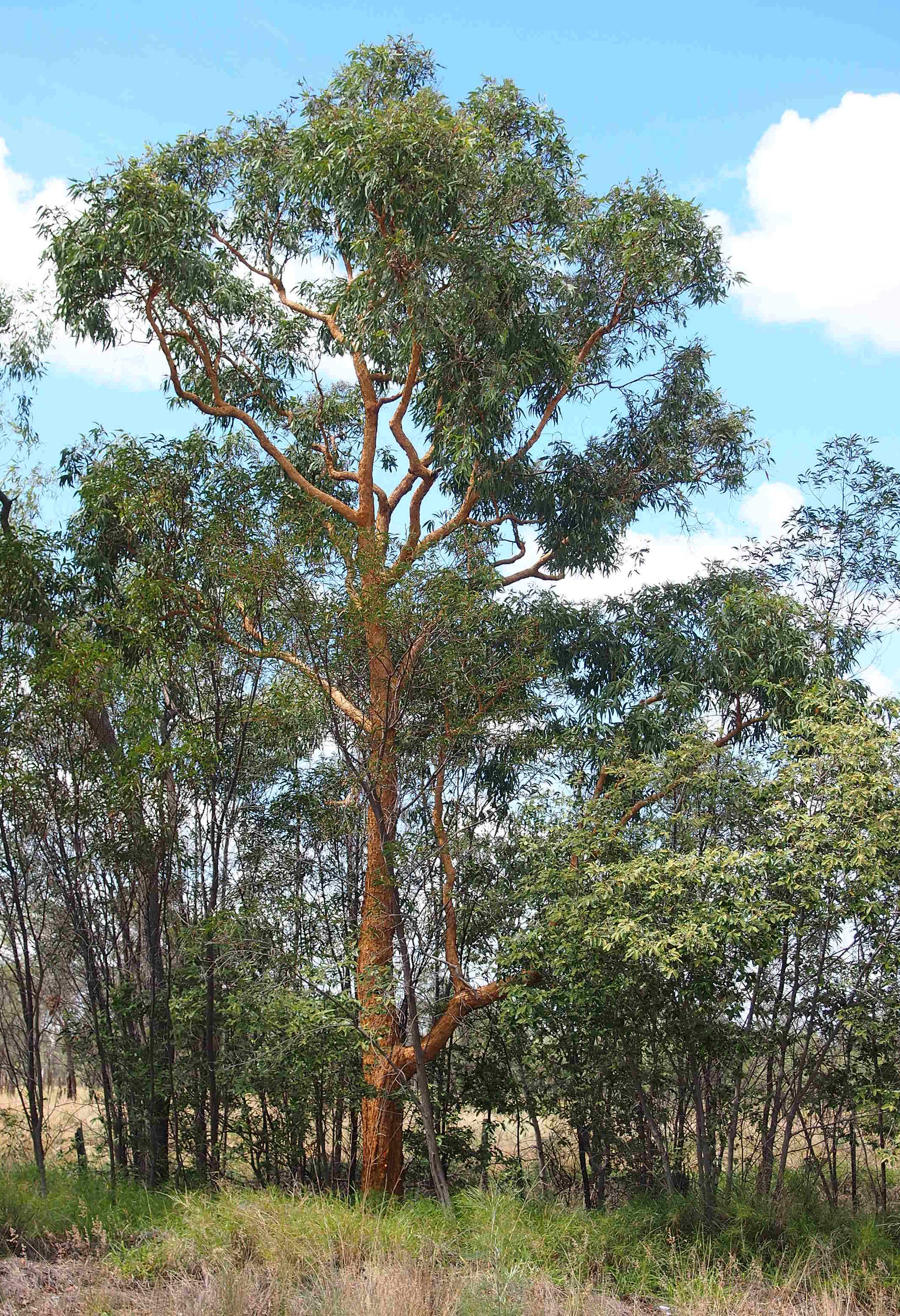

Scientific classification
- Kingdom: Plantae
- Clade: Tracheophytes
- Clade: Angiosperms
- Clade: Eudicots
- Clade: Rosids
- Order: Myrtales
- Family: Myrtaceae
- Genus: Eucalyptus
- Species: E. similis

Binomial name
- Eucalyptus similis Maiden

= Eucalyptus similis =

Inland yellowjacket

Species of eucalyptus

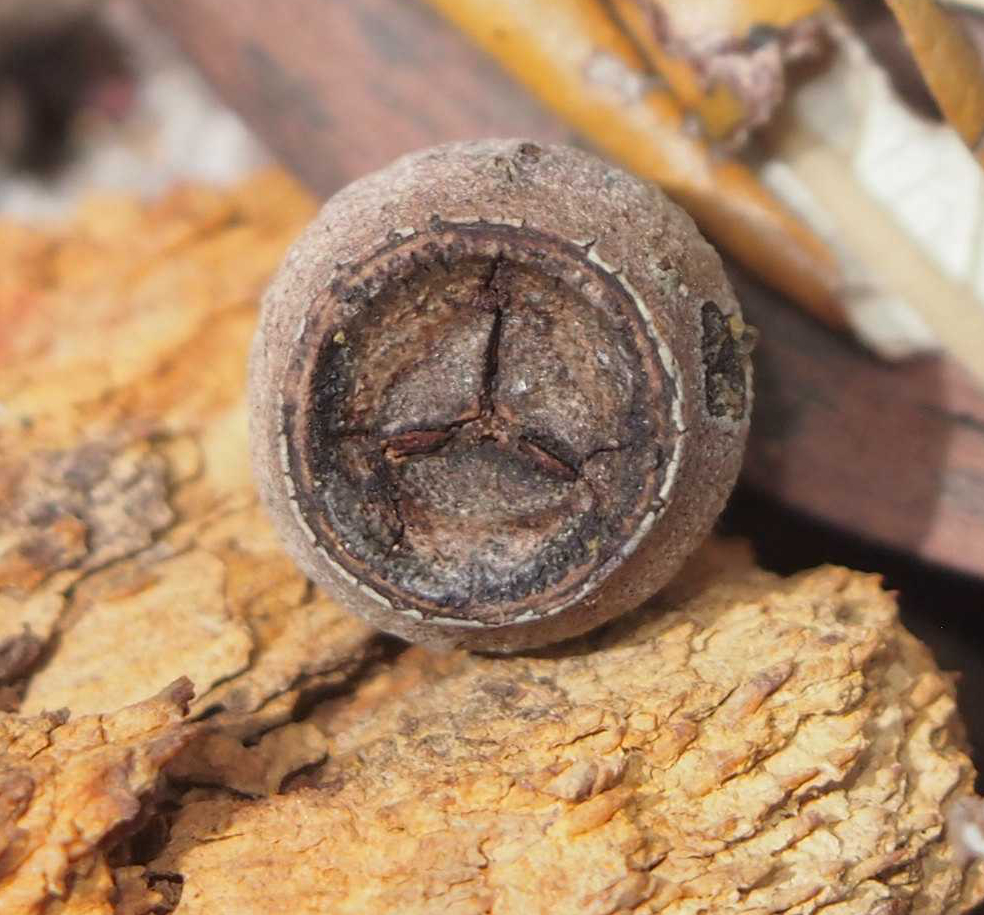
Capsule

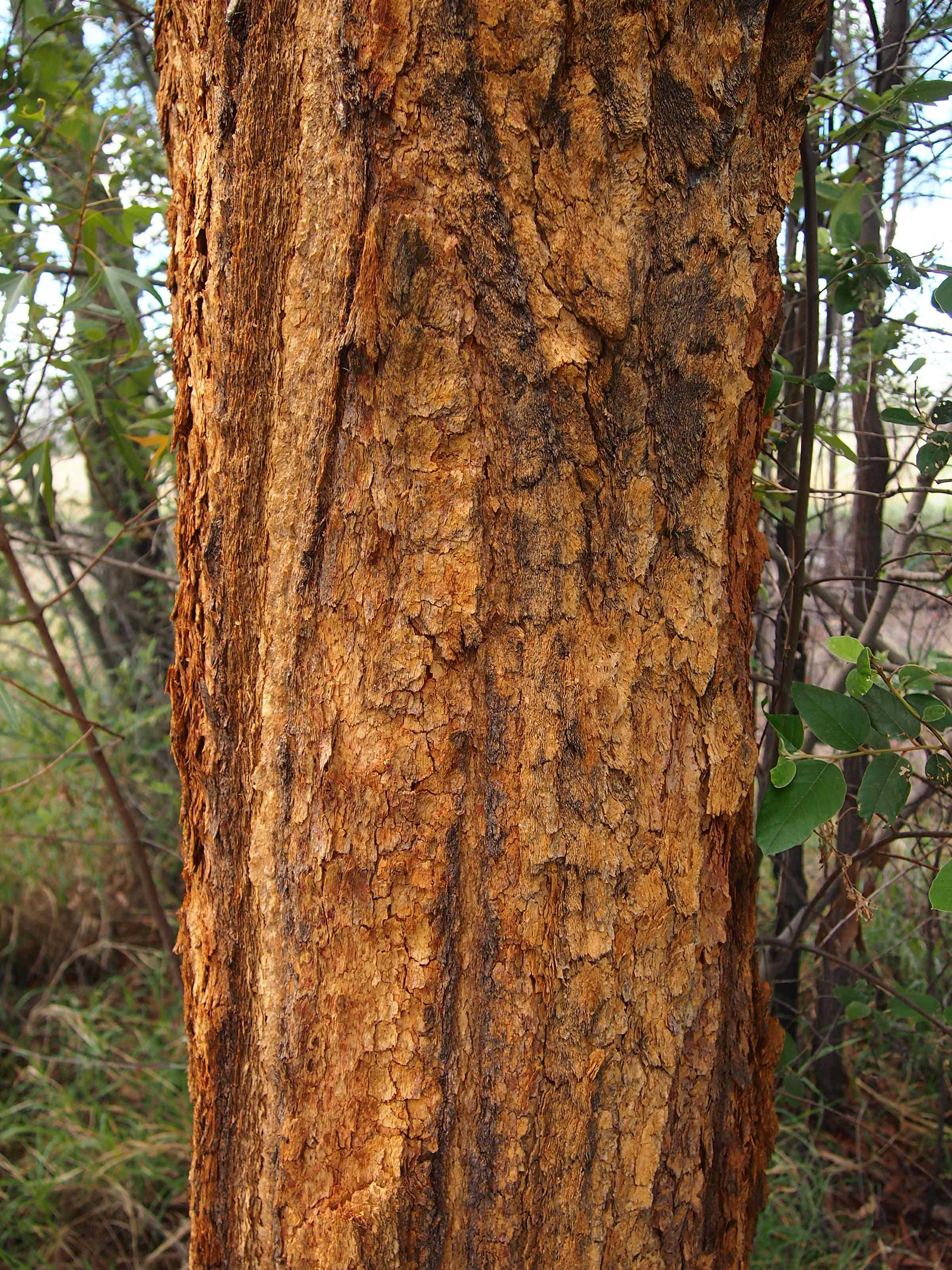
Bark

Eucalyptus similis, commonly known as inland yellowjacket or Queensland yellow jacket, is a species of flowering plant in the family Myrtaceae and is endemic to Queensland, Australia. It is a tree with rough bark, lance-shaped to broadly lance-shaped or sickle-shaped adult leaves, flower buds in groups of seven, white or cream-coloured flowers and cylindrical to cup-shaped or barrel-shaped fruit.

== Description ==
Eucalyptus similis is a tree that typically grows to a height of 8 to 14 metres (26 to 46 ft) and has rough, yellow to yellow-brown or red-brown bark over most of the trunk and branches. Leaves on young plants and on coppice regrowth are sometimes arranged in opposite pairs, egg-shaped, 60–130 mm (2.4–5.1 in) long and 30–70 mm (1.2–2.8 in) wide. Adult leaves are lance-shaped to broadly lance-shaped or sickle-shaped, 85–180 mm (3.3–7.1 in) long, 10–35 mm (0.39–1.38 in) wide and tapering to the petiole with the lower surface a lighter shade of green. The flowers are borne in umbels of seven in leaf axils on a peduncle 14–20 mm (0.55–0.79 in) long, each bud on a pedicel 1–8 mm (0.039–0.315 in) long. Mature buds are cylindrical to pear-shaped or spindle-shaped, 8–12 mm (0.31–0.47 in) long and 4–5 mm (0.16–0.20 in) wide with a conical to rounded operculum. Flowering has been observed in December and the flowers are white or cream-coloured, and the fruit is a cylindrical to cup-shaped or barrel-shaped capsule, 8–15 mm (0.31–0.59 in) long and 6–13 mm (0.24–0.51 in) wide.

Eucalyptus similis is very similar in appearance to Corymbia leichhardtii.

== Taxonomy and naming ==
Eucalyptus similis was first formally described by the botanist Joseph Maiden in 1913 in the Journal and Proceedings of the Royal Society of New South Wales from samples collected by G.H. Carr from Emerald in 1908. The specific epithet (similis) is a Latin word, referring to the similarity, in Maiden's view, to E. baileyana. E. similis is in the Eucalyptus subgenus Eudesmia and is the only non-bloodwood species likely to be confused with the yellow bloodwoods. It has very similar bark but differs fundamentally in having buds in simple axillary umbels of 7, and lacks the outer operculum, instead having four calyx teeth, and also has a single petaline operculum.

== Distribution and habitat ==
Found in woodland communities, Eucalyptus similis grows on gentle slopes and flats in deep clay, loamy or sandy soils, in a narrow north-south band from near Forsayth to the Barcaldine-Jericho region in Central Queensland with two disjunct populations near Laura and east of Strathburn Station on Cape York in North Queensland.

E. similis often occurs with Corymbia setosa, forming a sparse canopy. Associated species in the shrub layer, which is also usually sparse, includes Lithomyrtus microphylla, Carissa lanceolata, Gastrolobium grandiflorum and Jacksonia ramosissima. Triodia pungens usually dominants the very sparse to sparse ground layer.

== Conservation status ==
Eucalyptus similis is listed as of "least concern" under the Queensland Government Nature Conservation Act 1992.

== See also ==
- List of Eucalyptus species
