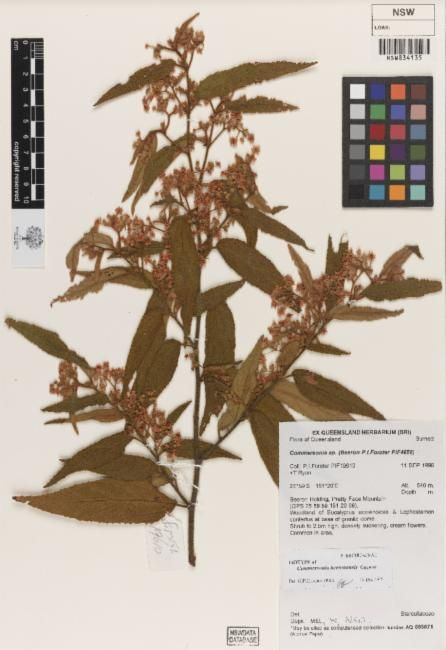
- Isotype in the National Herbarium of New South Wales

Conservation status
- Critically endangered (EPBC Act)

Scientific classification
- Kingdom: Plantae
- Clade: Embryophytes
- Clade: Tracheophytes
- Clade: Spermatophytes
- Clade: Angiosperms
- Clade: Eudicots
- Clade: Rosids
- Order: Malvales
- Family: Malvaceae
- Genus: Androcalva
- Species: A. beeronensis

Binomial name
- Androcalva beeronensis (Guymer) C.F.Wilkins & Whitlock

Synonyms
- Commersonia beeronensis Guymer; Commersonia sp. 'Beeron' (P.I.Forster PIF4658); Commersonia sp. (Beeron P.I.Forster PIF4658); Commersonia sp. 2 (Beeron; P.I.Forster 4658)

= Androcalva beeronensis =

Species of shrub

Androcalva beeronensis is a species of flowering plant in the family Malvaceae and is endemic to Queensland. It is a shrub that forms suckers from rhizomes and has branchlets and leaves covered with soft, golden hairs, the leaves egg-shaped to lance-shaped with toothed edges, and clusters of 9 to 24 cream-coloured to white flowers.

== Description ==
Androcalva beeronensis is a shrub that typically grows to 1.0–2.5 m (3 ft 3 in – 8 ft 2 in) high, 1–2 m (3 ft 3 in – 6 ft 7 in) wide, forms suckers from rhizomes, and has its new growth covered with golden, star-shaped hairs. The leaves are egg-shaped to lance-shaped, 50–120 mm (2.0–4.7 in) long and 10–40 mm (0.39–1.57 in) wide on a petiole 4–7 mm (0.16–0.28 in) long with triangular stipules 2–6 mm (0.079–0.236 in) long at the base, but that fall off as the leaf matures. There are 24 to 30 pairs of teeth up to 1 mm (0.039 in) long on the edges of the leaves and both surfaces of the leaves are hairy. The flowers are arranged in dense clusters of 9 to 24 on a peduncle 6–10 mm (0.24–0.39 in) long, each flower on a pedicel 2.5–5 mm (0.098–0.197 in) long, with triangular bracts 3–5 mm (0.12–0.20 in) long at the base. The flowers are cream-coloured to white and 6–8 mm (0.24–0.31 in) in diameter with 5 petal-like sepals with star-shaped hairs on the outside. The petals are 4.5–4.8 mm (0.18–0.19 in) long with 3 lobes longer than the sepal lobes, and there are 3 staminodes, the central one spatula-shaped and all three longer than the sepal lobes. Flowering has been recorded from August to November.

== Taxonomy ==
This species was first formally described in 2005 by Gordon Guymer who gave it the name Commersonia beeronensis in the journal Austrobaileya from specimens collected by Paul Irwin Forster in Beeron Holding in 1996. In 2011, Carolyn Wilkins and Barbara Whitlock transferred the species to Androcalva as A. beeronensis in Australian Systematic Botany. The specific epithet (beeronensis) refers to Beeron Holding, the only known location for this species.

== Distribution and habitat ==
Androcalva beeronensis grows on and around granite outcrops in open forest and woodland in Beeron National Park in south-east Queensland.

== Conservation Status ==
Androcalva beeronensis is listed as "critically endangered" under the Queensland Nature Conservation Act 1992, and "critically endangered" under the Australian Government Environment Protection and Biodiversity Conservation Act 1999.
