= Hibbertia monticola =

Mountain guinea flower

Conservation status
- Near Threatened (NCA)

Scientific classification
- Kingdom: Plantae
- Clade: Tracheophytes
- Clade: Angiosperms
- Clade: Eudicots
- Order: Dilleniales
- Family: Dilleniaceae
- Genus: Hibbertia
- Species: H. monticola

Binomial name
- Hibbertia monticola Stanley

Species of plant

Hibbertia monticola, commonly known as mountain guinea flower, is a species of flowering plant in the family Dilleniaceae and is endemic to south-eastern Queensland. It is a shrub with elliptic to egg-shaped leaves, and yellow flowers with many stamens arranged around three glabrous carpels.

== Description ==
Hibbertia monticola is a shrub that typically grows to a height of up to 1.5 m (4 ft 11 in). The leaves are elliptic to egg-shaped with the narrower end towards the base, 15–50 mm (0.59–1.97 in) long and 2.5–12 mm (0.098–0.472 in) wide on a short petiole. The edges of the leaves curve downwards, the upper surface has a few white hairs along the mid-vein but the lower surface is glabrous. The flowers are arranged singly in leaf axils and are sessile. The five sepals are 7–8 mm (0.28–0.31 in) long and joined at the base, with conspicuous white hairs on the edges of the lobes. The five petals are yellow, 6–12 mm (0.24–0.47 in) long with many stamens arranged around three glabrous carpels.

== Taxonomy ==
Hibbertia monticola was first formally described in 1984 by Trevor Donald Stanley in the journal Austrobaileya from specimens collected by Cyril Tenison White on Mount Ernest in 1932. The specific epithet (monticola) means "dweller in mountains".

== Distribution and habitat ==
Mountain guinea flower is only known from the Mount Barney National Park in south-eastern Queensland, where it grows in rocky places at altitudes above 400 m (1,300 ft).

== Conservation status ==
This hibbertia is classified as "near threatened" under the Queensland Government Nature Conservation Act 1992.

== See also ==
- List of Hibbertia species
