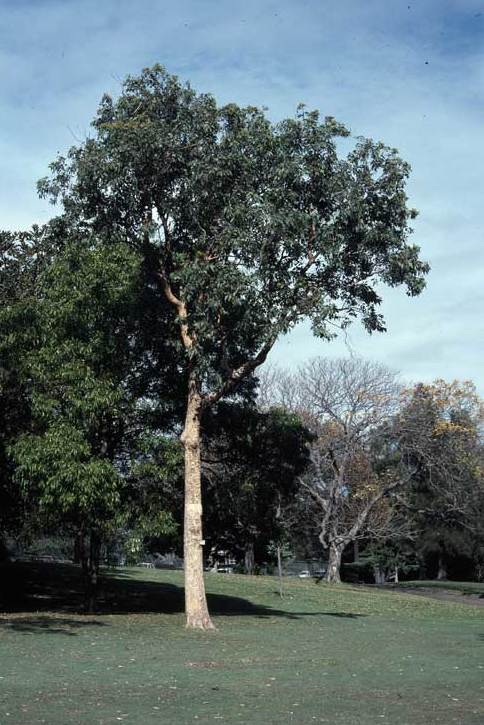
- Corymbia watsoniana in the Royal Botanic Garden, Sydney

Conservation status
- Least Concern (IUCN 3.1)

Scientific classification
- Kingdom: Plantae
- Clade: Embryophytes
- Clade: Tracheophytes
- Clade: Spermatophytes
- Clade: Angiosperms
- Clade: Eudicots
- Clade: Rosids
- Order: Myrtales
- Family: Myrtaceae
- Genus: Corymbia
- Species: C. watsoniana

Binomial name
- Corymbia watsoniana (F.Muell.) K.D.Hill & L.A.S.Johnson

Synonyms
- Eucalyptus watsoniana F.Muell.; Eucalyptus watsoniana F.Muell. subsp. watsoniana

= Corymbia watsoniana =

Large-fruited yellowjacket

Species of plant

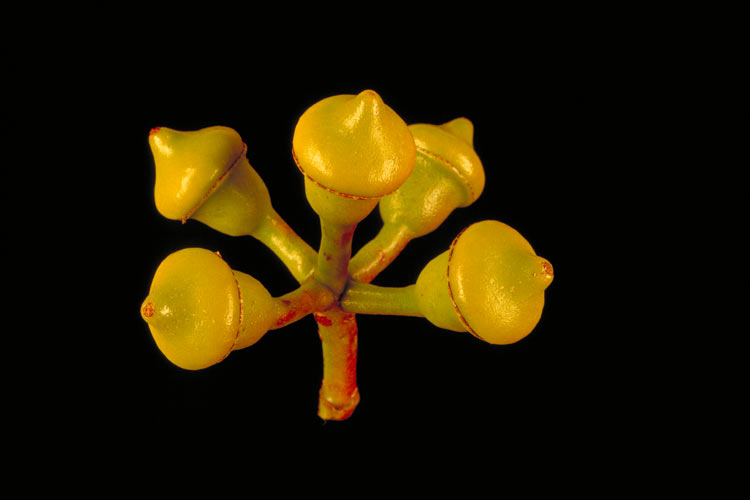
flower buds

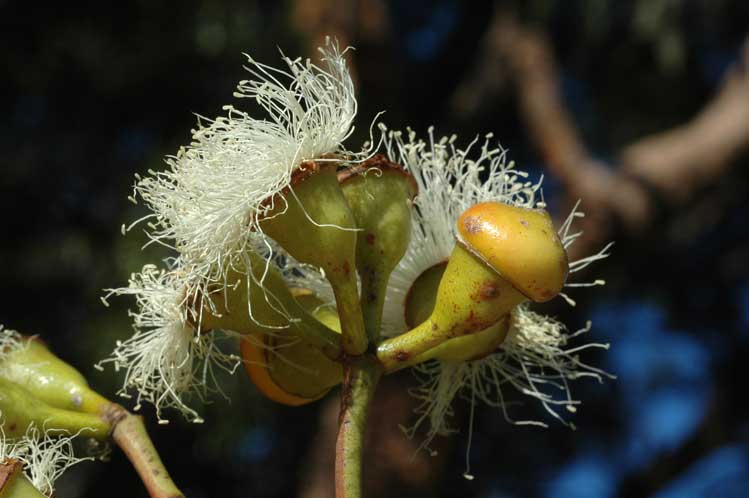
flowers

Corymbia watsoniana, commonly known as large-fruited yellowjacket, is a species of tree that is endemic to Queensland. It has rough, tessellated bark on the trunk and branches, egg-shaped to broadly lance-shaped adult leaves, flower buds in groups of seven, creamy white flowers and barrel-shaped or urn-shaped fruit.

== Description ==
Corymbia watsoniana is a tree that typically grows to a height of 15–20 m (49–66 ft) and forms a lignotuber. It has rough, flaky to tessellated yellowish to brownish bark on the trunk and branches. Young plants and coppice regrowth have leaves that are the same shade of dull green on both sides, egg-shaped to lance-shaped 120–210 mm (4.7–8.3 in) long, 50–95 mm (2.0–3.7 in) wide and petiolate. Adult leaves are the same shade of green on both sides, egg-shaped to broadly lance-shaped, 90–215 mm (3.5–8.5 in) long and 18–65 mm (0.71–2.56 in) wide, on a petiole 13–40 mm (0.51–1.57 in) long. The flower buds are arranged on the ends of branchlets on a branched peduncle 9–45 mm (0.35–1.77 in) long, each branch of the peduncle with seven buds on pedicels 4–18 mm (0.16–0.71 in) long. Mature buds are oval, 15–20 mm (0.59–0.79 in) long and 12–17 mm (0.47–0.67 in) wide with a flattened to rounded operculum with a small point in the centre. The operculum is much wider than the floral cup. Flowering has been observed in June and the flowers are creamy white. The fruit is a woody barrel-shaped to urn-shaped or more or less cylindrical capsule 20–32 mm (0.79–1.26 in) long and 18–24 mm (0.71–0.94 in) wide with the valves enclosed in the fruit.

== Taxonomy ==
The large-fruited yellowjacket was first formally described in 1877 by Ferdinand von Mueller who gave it the name Eucalyptus watsonianain his book Fragmenta Phytographiae Australiae. The specific epithet honours "Th. Wentworth Watson" who collected the type specimens near Wigton. In 1995, Ken Hill and Lawrie Johnson changed the name to Corymbia watsoniana, publishing the change in the journal Telopea.

In the same paper, Hill and Johnson described two subspecies and the names have been accepted by the Australian Plant Census:

- Corymbia watsoniana subsp. capillata (Brooker & A.R.Bean) K.D.Hill & L.A.S.Johnson has bristly late juvenile and intermediate leaves with the petiole attached to the underside of the leaf blade;
- Corymbia watsoniana (F.Muell.) K.D.Hill & L.A.S.Johnson subsp. watsoniana has late juvenile and intermediate leaves with the leaf blade tapering to the petiole.

== Distribution and habitat ==
This eucalypt grows in forest, mainly on flat areas with sandy soil. It is found between Springsure, Rolleston, Eidsvold, Gayndah and the Barakula State Forest.

== See also ==
- List of Corymbia species
