= Acacia longipedunculata =

Conservation status
- Least Concern (IUCN 3.1)
- Near Threatened (NCA)

Scientific classification
- Kingdom: Plantae
- Clade: Tracheophytes
- Clade: Angiosperms
- Clade: Eudicots
- Clade: Rosids
- Order: Fabales
- Family: Fabaceae
- Subfamily: Caesalpinioideae
- Clade: Mimosoid clade
- Genus: Acacia
- Species: A. longipedunculata

Binomial name
- Acacia longipedunculata Pedley
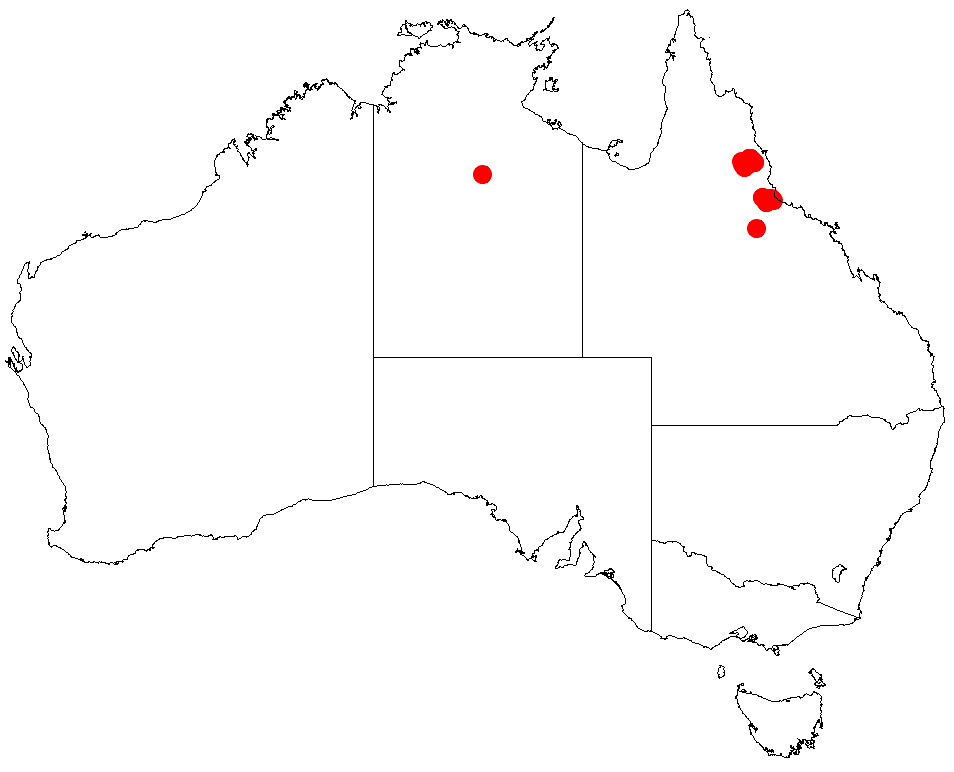
- Occurrence data from AVH

Synonyms
- Racosperma longipedunculatum (Pedley) Pedley

Species of legume

Acacia longipedunculata is a species of flowering plant in the family Fabaceae and is endemic to Queensland in the north-east of Australia. It is a shrub, with phyllodes arranged in more or less terete whorls of 15 to 27, heads of yellow flowers, and linear, sessile, curved pods.

== Description ==
Acacia longipedunculata is a shrub that typically grows to a height of up to 1 m (3 ft 3 in) and has branchlets thickly covered with soft hairs and somewhat sticky. The phyllodes are more or less terete at the base and arranged in whorls of 15 to 27, abruptly contracted at the tip into a point about 1.0–1.5 mm (0.039–0.059 in) long and thickly covered with soft hairs. The flowers are yellow and borne in slightly elongated heads of 25 to 40, on peduncles 15–45 mm (0.59–1.77 in) long, and usually longer than the phyllodes. The pods are sessile, linear and curved, 20–40 mm (0.79–1.57 in) long, 6–8 mm (0.24–0.31 in) wide and glabrous. The seeds are flattened spheres and about 4 mm (0.16 in) long.

== Taxonomy ==
Acacia longipedunculata was first formally described in 1972 by Leslie Pedley in Contributions from the Queensland Herbarium, from a specimen collected in 1962 on the Stannary Hills. The specific epithet (longipedunculata) means 'long peduncles'.

== Distribution and habitat ==
This species of wattle is restricted to an area near Herberton and in the Paluma Range in north-eastern Queensland in shallow sandy and rocky soils in open forest. A disjunct population is also recorded from the Northern Territory.

== Conservation status ==
Acacia longipedunculata is listed as "near threatened" under the Queensland Nature Conservation Act 1992. It is not listed under the Australian Environment Protection and Biodiversity Conservation Act 1999. The IUCN Red List assesses the species as Least Concern.
