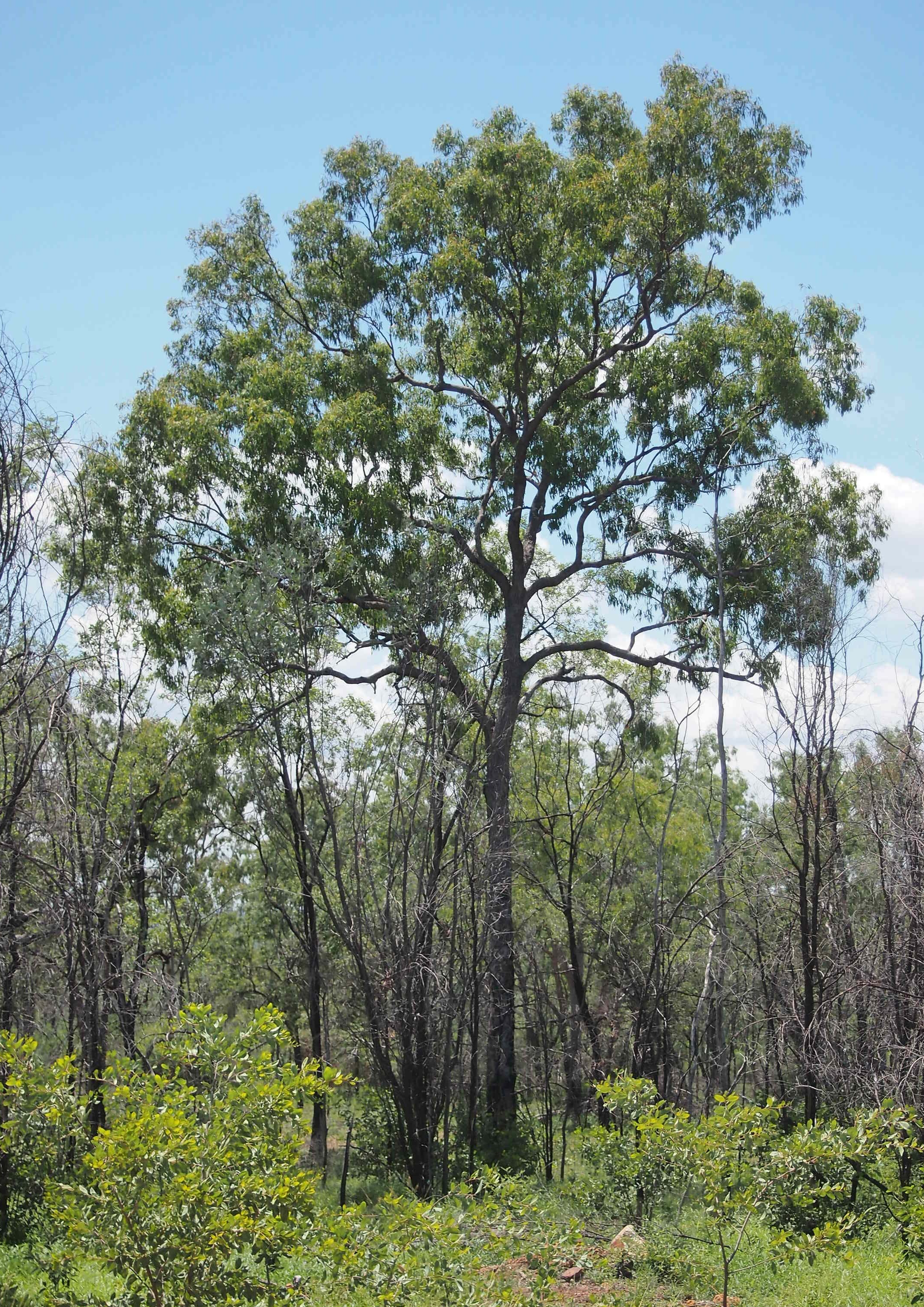
- Corymbia trachyphloia near the Blackdown Tableland

Scientific classification
- Kingdom: Plantae
- Clade: Tracheophytes
- Clade: Angiosperms
- Clade: Eudicots
- Clade: Rosids
- Order: Myrtales
- Family: Myrtaceae
- Genus: Corymbia
- Species: C. trachyphloia

Binomial name
- Corymbia trachyphloia (F.Muell.) K.D.Hill & L.A.S.Johnson

Synonyms
- synonyms: Corymbia trachyphloia subsp. amphistomatica K.D.Hill & L.A.S.Johnson; Corymbia trachyphloia subsp. carnarvonica K.D.Hill & L.A.S.Johnson; Corymbia trachyphloia (F.Muell.) K.D.Hill & L.A.S.Johnson subsp. trachyphloia; Eucalyptus trachyphloia F.Muell.; Eucalyptus trachyphloia f. fruticosa F.M.Bailey; Eucalyptus trachyphloia F.Muell. f. trachyphloia

= Corymbia trachyphloia =

Brown bloodwood

Species of plant

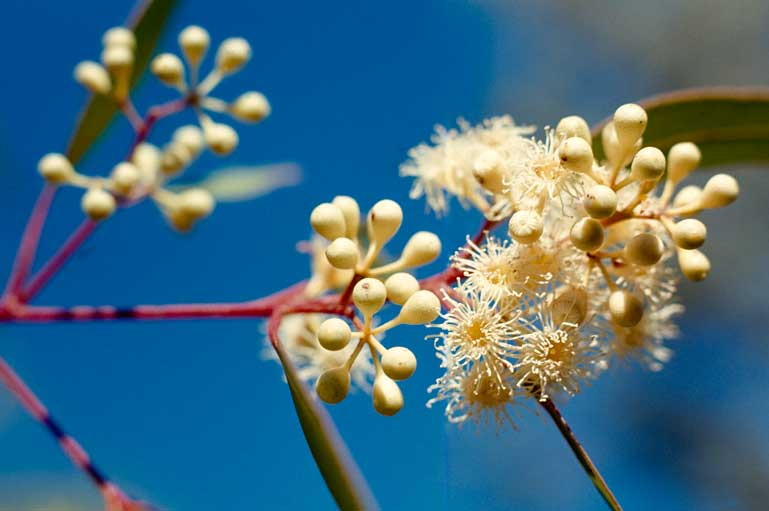
buds and flowers

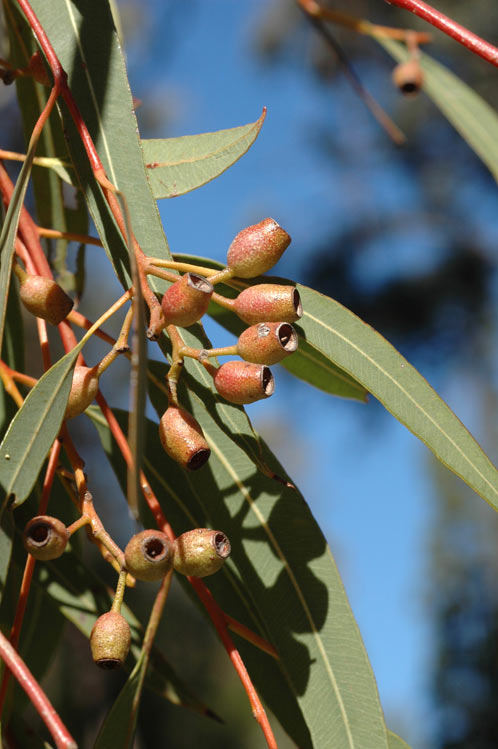
fruit

Corymbia trachyphloia, commonly known as brown bloodwood, is a species of small to medium-sized tree that is endemic to eastern Australia. It has rough, tessellated bark on the trunk, often also on the larger branches, lance-shaped adult leaves, flower buds in groups of seven, white flowers and urn-shaped fruit.

== Description ==
Corymbia trachyphloia is a tree that typically grows to a height of 15 m (49 ft) and forms a lignotuber. It has rough, brown and greyish bark on the trunk, often also on the larger branches. Young plants and coppice regrowth have lance-shaped, glossy green leaves that are paler on the lower surface, 50–120 mm (2.0–4.7 in) long, 10–35 mm (0.39–1.38 in) wide and petiolate, the petiole is attached to the underside of the leaf blade. Adult leaves are usually glossy dark green, paler on the lower surface, narrow lance-shaped to lance-shaped, 65–140 mm (2.6–5.5 in) long and 9–26 mm (0.35–1.02 in) wide, tapering to a petiole 8–20 mm (0.31–0.79 in) long, The flower buds are arranged on a branched peduncle 4–13 mm (0.16–0.51 in) long, each branch of the peduncle with seven buds on pedicels 2–7 mm (0.079–0.276 in) long. Mature buds are pear-shaped, 4–5 mm (0.16–0.20 in) long and 2–4 mm (0.079–0.157 in) wide with a rounded operculum. Flowering occurs from December to June and the flowers are white. The fruit is a thin-walled, urn-shaped capsule 6–10 mm (0.24–0.39 in) long and 5–8 mm (0.20–0.31 in) wide with the valves enclosed in the fruit.

== Taxonomy and naming ==
The brown bloodwood was first formally described in 1859 by Ferdinand von Mueller who gave it the name Eucalyptus trachyphloia and published the description in the Journal of the Proceedings of the Linnean Society, Botany from specimens collected near the Burnett River. In 1995, Ken Hill and Lawrie Johnson changed the name to Corymbia trachyphloia, publishing the change in the journal Telopea.

== Distribution and habitat ==
Corymbia trachyphloia usually grows in sandy soils on plains and sandstone outcrops from the Goulburn River in New South Wales and north to the Blackdown Tableland, Carnarvon Range and Atherton Tableland in Queensland.

== See also ==
- List of Corymbia species
