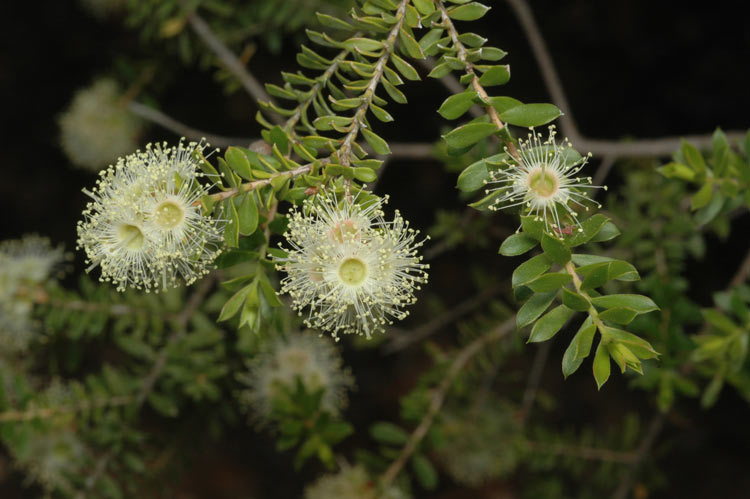
- In the Australian National Botanic Gardens

Scientific classification
- Kingdom: Plantae
- Clade: Tracheophytes
- Clade: Angiosperms
- Clade: Eudicots
- Clade: Rosids
- Order: Myrtales
- Family: Myrtaceae
- Genus: Kunzea
- Species: K. flavescens

Binomial name
- Kunzea flavescens C.T.White & W.D.Francis

= Kunzea flavescens =

Species of shrub

Kunzea flavescens is a plant in the myrtle family, Myrtaceae and is endemic to Queensland. It is a spreading shrub which has egg-shaped leaves and groups of white or cream-coloured flowers on the ends of the branches in September and October.

== Description ==
Kunzea flavescens is a spreading shrub, sometimes a small tree which usually grows to a height of about 3 m (10 ft) but sometimes to 7 m (20 ft). The leaves are arranged alternately along the branches and are oblong to lance-shaped with the narrower end towards the base. They are mostly 4–7 mm (0.2–0.3 in) long and 1.5–2.5 mm (0.06–0.1 in) wide on a pedicel less than 1 mm (0.04 in) long. The leaves are flat, slightly hairy when young and have more than sixty oil glands visible on the lower surface. The flowers are white or cream-coloured and arranged in rounded groups of eight to fifteen flowers on the ends of the branches. There are egg-shaped bracts which are 3–4 mm (0.1–0.2 in) long and about 2 mm (0.08 in) wide and smaller paired bracteoles at the base of each flower. The floral cup is 3–3.5 mm (0.12–0.14 in) long and hairy. The sepals are triangular, about 1.5–2 mm (0.06–0.08 in) long and hairy on their edges. The petals are oblong to egg-shaped with the narrower end towards the base, about 1.5–2 mm (0.06–0.08 in) long and there are about fifty stamens 2–3.5 mm (0.08–0.1 in) long, in several rows. Flowering occurs mainly in September and October and is followed by fruit which an urn-shaped capsule about 5 mm (0.2 in) long.

== Taxonomy and naming ==
Kunzea flavescens was first formally described in 1922 by Cyril White and William Francis from a specimen found near Crows Nest by Frederick Hamilton Kenny. The description was published in Proceedings of the Royal Society of Queensland. The specific epithet (flavescens) is a Latin word meaning "slightly yellow".

== Distribution and habitat ==
Growing on rocky ridges in heath and open woodland, K. flavenscens occurs in a few areas in south-east Queensland including near Crows Nest and Biggenden Bluff in the Mount Walsh National Park.

== Conservation ==
Kunzea flavescens is classified as "Least Concern" under the Queensland Nature Conservation Act 1992.
