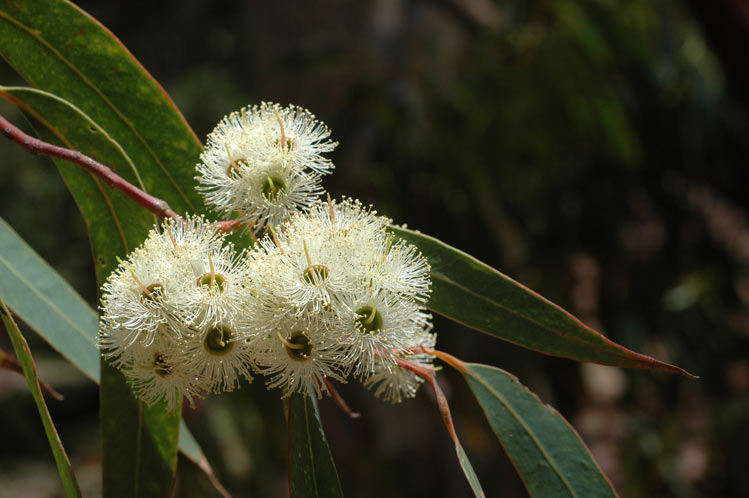
- Flowers of Eucalyptus planchoniana in the Australian National Botanic Gardens

Scientific classification
- Kingdom: Plantae
- Clade: Tracheophytes
- Clade: Angiosperms
- Clade: Eudicots
- Clade: Rosids
- Order: Myrtales
- Family: Myrtaceae
- Genus: Eucalyptus
- Species: E. planchoniana

Binomial name
- Eucalyptus planchoniana F.Muell.

= Eucalyptus planchoniana =

Needlebark stringybark

Species of eucalyptus

Eucalyptus planchoniana, commonly known as the needlebark stringybark or bastard tallowwood is a species of small to medium-sized tree that is endemic to eastern Australia. It has rough, stringy bark on the trunk and larger branches, lance-shaped to curved adult leaves, flower buds in groups of seven, white flowers and cup-shaped, cylindrical or barrel-shaped fruit.

== Description ==
Eucalyptus planchoniana is a tree that typically grows to a height of 20–25 m (66–82 ft) and forms a lignotuber. It has rough, reddish, often prickly, stringy bark on the trunk and larger branches. Young plants and coppice regrowth have elliptical to lance-shaped or curved, bluish green leaves that are 70–20 mm (2.76–0.79 in) long and 23–70 mm (0.91–2.76 in) wide and petiolate. Adult leaves are the same shade of green or bluish green on both sides, lance-shaped to curved, 80–260 mm (3.1–10.2 in) long and 15–35 mm (0.59–1.38 in) wide on a petiole 15–32 mm (0.59–1.26 in) long. The flower buds are arranged in leaf axils on an unbranched, flattened peduncle 20–32 mm (0.79–1.26 in) wide, the individual buds on pedicels 20–32 mm (0.79–1.26 in) long. Mature buds are oval to spindle-shaped or diamond-shaped, 20–29 mm (0.79–1.14 in) long and 8–10 mm (0.31–0.39 in) wide with a conical to beaked operculum. Flowering occurs from October to December and the flowers are white. The fruit is a woody, cup-shaped, cylindrical or barrel-shaped capsule 17–28 mm (0.67–1.10 in) long and 16–26 mm (0.63–1.02 in) wide with the valves below rim level.

== Taxonomy and naming ==
Eucalyptus planchoniana was first formally described in 1878 by Ferdinand von Mueller in Fragmenta phytographiae Australiae from material collected from near Moreton Bay by Frederick Manson Bailey. The specific epithet honours Jules Emile Planchon.

== Distribution and habitat ==
Needlebark stringbark grows in open forest on low ridges and gentle slopes from Moreton Island and Stradbroke Island in Queensland to Camden Haven in coastal New South Wales and as far inland as the Gibraltar Range National Park.
