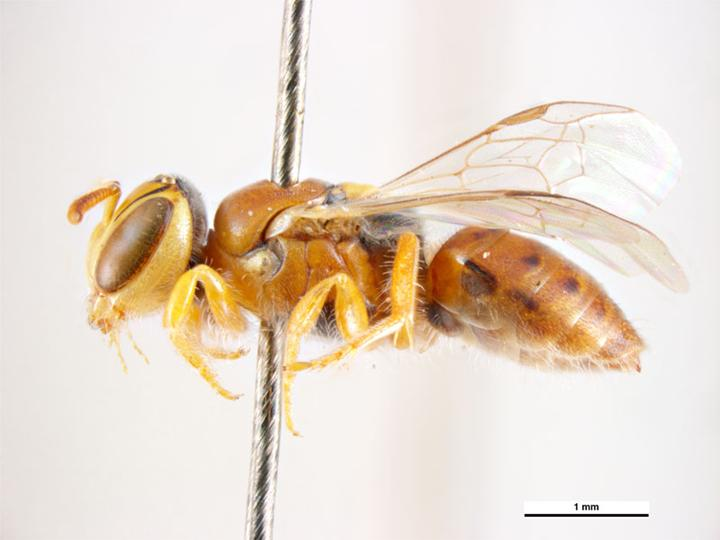
- Female

Scientific classification
- Kingdom: Animalia
- Phylum: Arthropoda
- Clade: Pancrustacea
- Class: Insecta
- Order: Hymenoptera
- Family: Colletidae
- Genus: Pachyprosopis
- Species: P. kununurra

Binomial name
- Pachyprosopis kununurra Exley, 1976

= Pachyprosopis kununurra =

Species of bee

Pachyprosopis kununurra, or Pachyprosopis (Pachyprosopula) kununurra, is a species of bee in the family Colletidae and subfamily Euryglossinae. It is endemic to Australia. It was described by Australian entomologist Elizabeth Exley in 1976.

== Etymology ==
The specific epithet kununurra refers to the type locality.

== Description ==
The holotype female body length is about 4.5 mm, wing length 3.1 mm; male allotype body length 4.2, wing length 3.0 mm. Integumental colouration is mainly yellow and black; the hair is mostly white.

== Distribution and habitat ==
The species occurs in tropical northern Australia. The type locality is 24 km south-west of Kununurra in the Kimberley region of northern Western Australia.

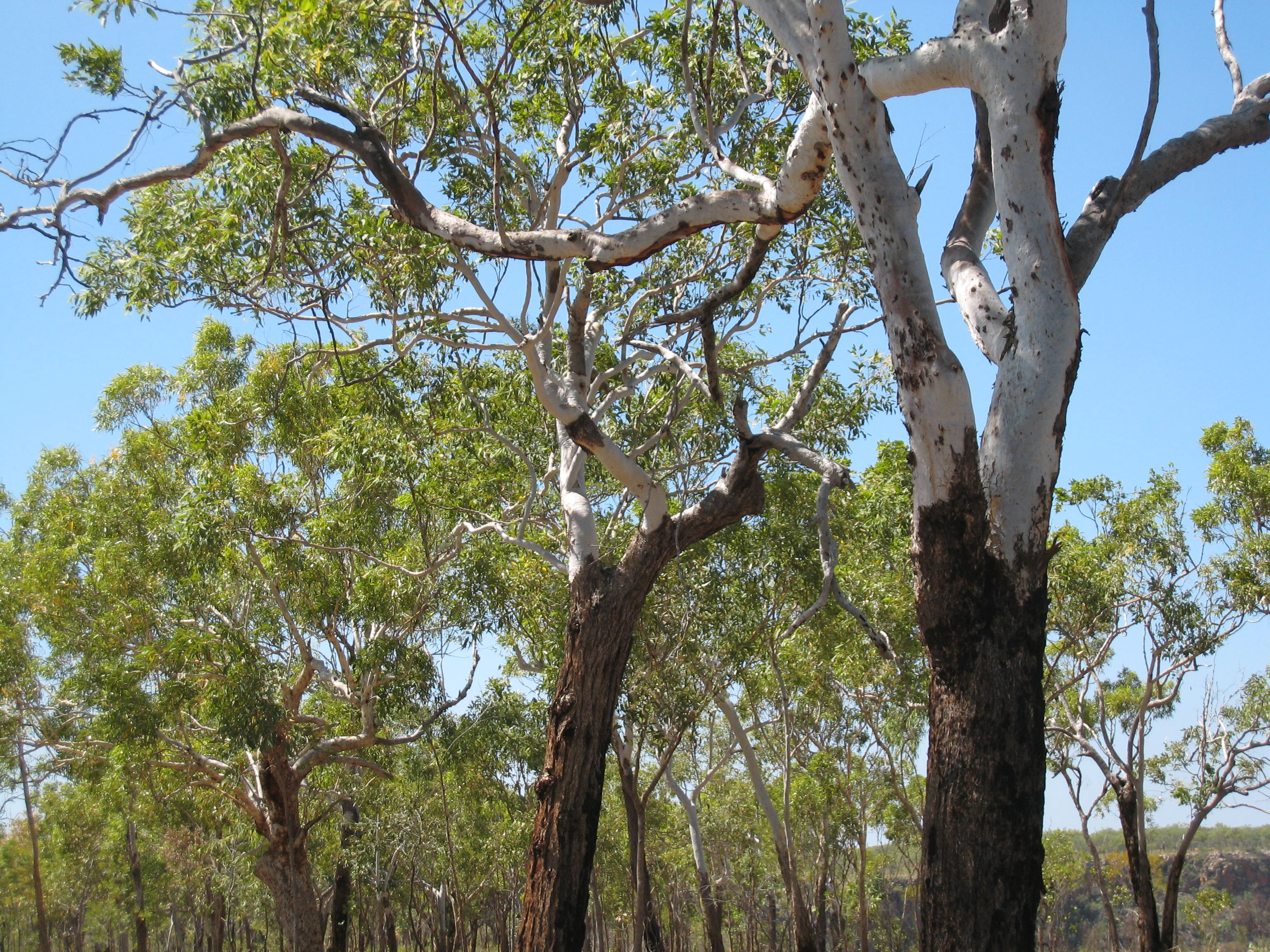
Eucalyptus miniata (Darwin woollybutt), a forage plant of the bees

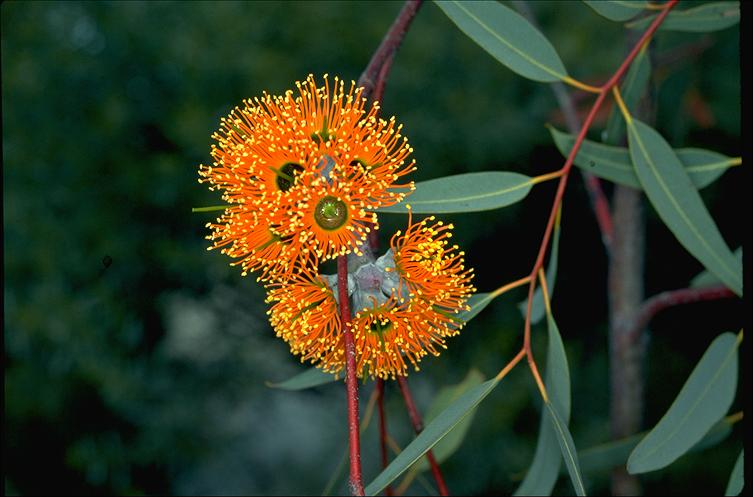
Flowers of Eucalyptus miniata

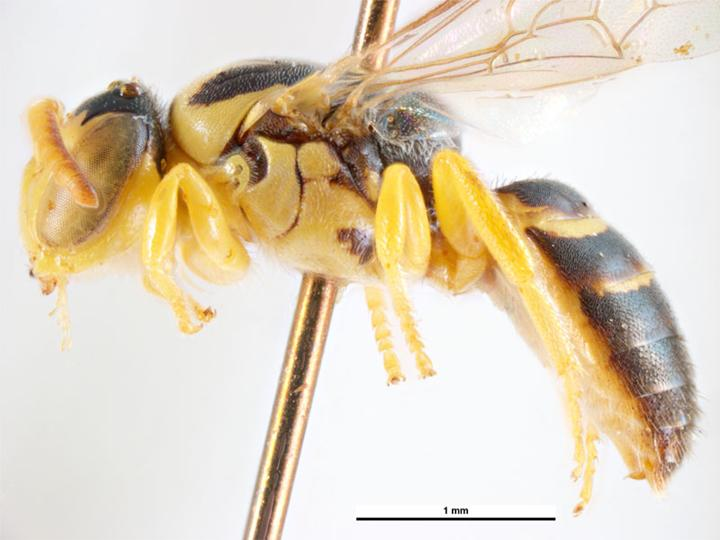
Male

== Behaviour ==
The adults are flying mellivores. Flowering plants visited by the bees include Eucalyptus miniata and Corymbia cadophora.
