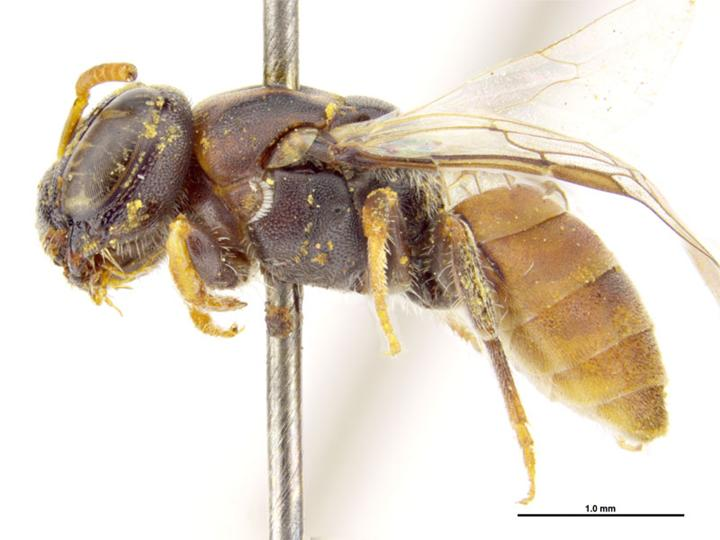
- Female

Scientific classification
- Kingdom: Animalia
- Phylum: Arthropoda
- Clade: Pancrustacea
- Class: Insecta
- Order: Hymenoptera
- Family: Colletidae
- Genus: Pachyprosopis
- Species: P. melanognathus

Binomial name
- Pachyprosopis melanognathus Exley, 1976

= Pachyprosopis melanognathus =

Species of bee

Pachyprosopis melanognathus, or Pachyprosopis (Parapachyprosopis) melanognathus, is a species of bee in the family Colletidae and subfamily Euryglossinae. It is endemic to Australia. It was described by Australian entomologist Elizabeth Exley in 1976.

== Etymology ==
The specific epithet melanognathus refers to the black mandibles.

== Description ==
The holotype male body length is about 4.6 mm, wing length 2.9 mm; female allotype body length 4.9, wing length 3.4 mm. Integumental colouration is mainly black with yellow, reddish and brown markings; the hair is sparse and white to brown.

== Distribution and habitat ==
The species occurs in the tropical Top End of the Northern Territory. The type locality is Nourlangie Creek, 8 km east of Mount Cahill.

== Behaviour ==
The adults are flying mellivores. Flowering plants visited by the bees include Eucalyptus species.

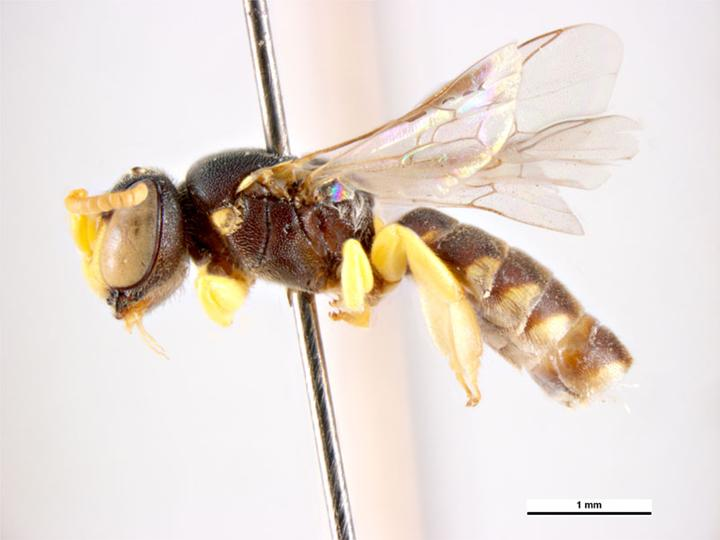
Male
