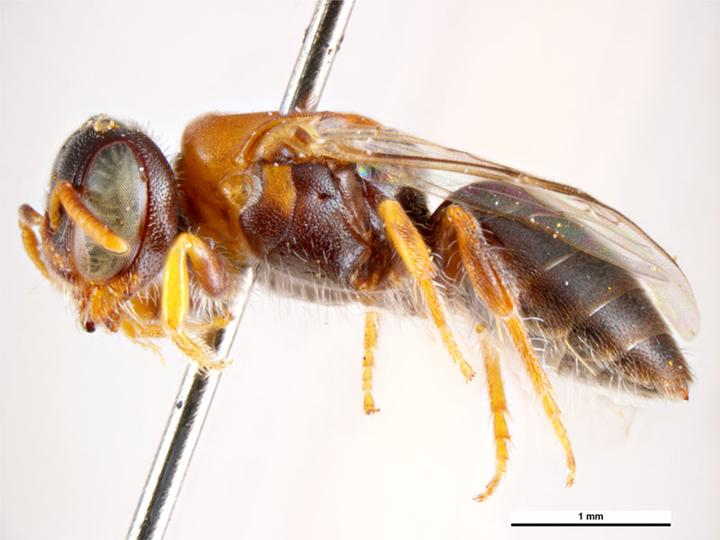
- Female

Scientific classification
- Kingdom: Animalia
- Phylum: Arthropoda
- Clade: Pancrustacea
- Class: Insecta
- Order: Hymenoptera
- Family: Colletidae
- Genus: Pachyprosopis
- Species: P. grossoscapus

Binomial name
- Pachyprosopis grossoscapus Exley, 1976

= Pachyprosopis grossoscapus =

Species of bee

Pachyprosopis grossoscapus, or Pachyprosopis (Parapachyprosopis) grossoscapus, is a species of bee in the family Colletidae and subfamily Euryglossinae. It is endemic to Australia. It was described by Australian entomologist Elizabeth Exley in 1976.

== Etymology ==
The specific epithet grossoscapus refers to "the thick antennal scapes characteristic of this species".

== Description ==
The holotype male body length is about 4.0 mm, wing length 2.8 mm; female allotype body length 4.5, wing length 3.0 mm. Integumental colouration is mainly black and yellow or reddish-orange; the hair is sparse and white.

== Distribution and habitat ==
The species occurs in tropical northern Australia. The type locality is 24 km south-west of Kununurra in the Kimberley region of northern Western Australia.

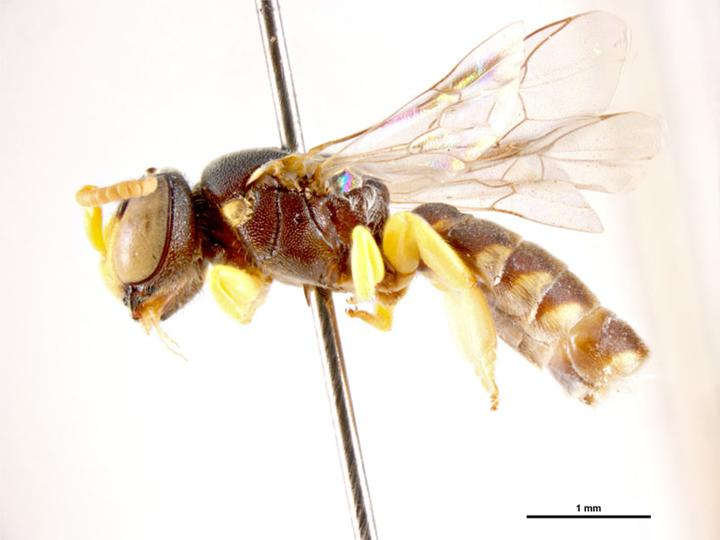
Male

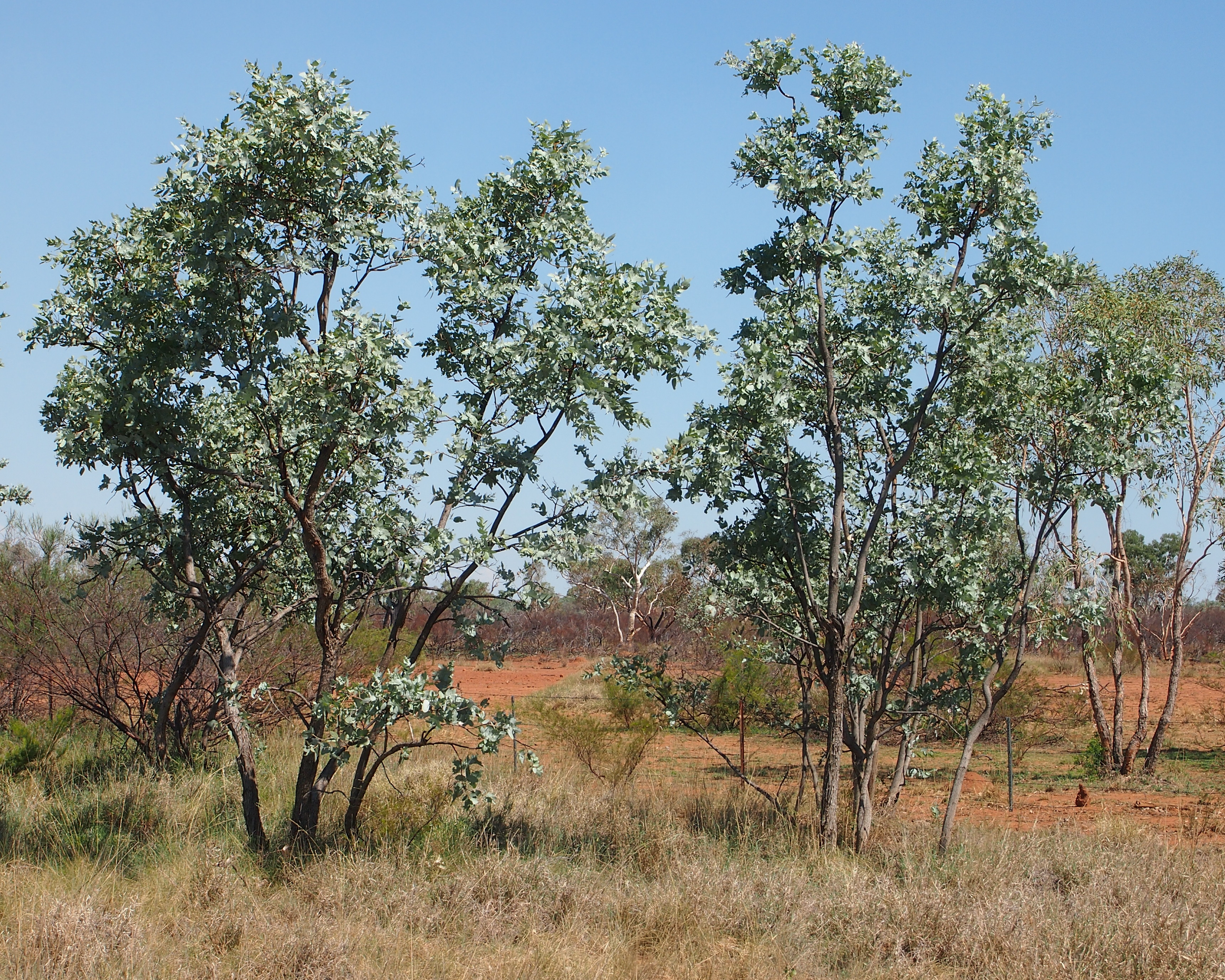
Eucalyptus pruinosa (silver box), a forage plant of the bees

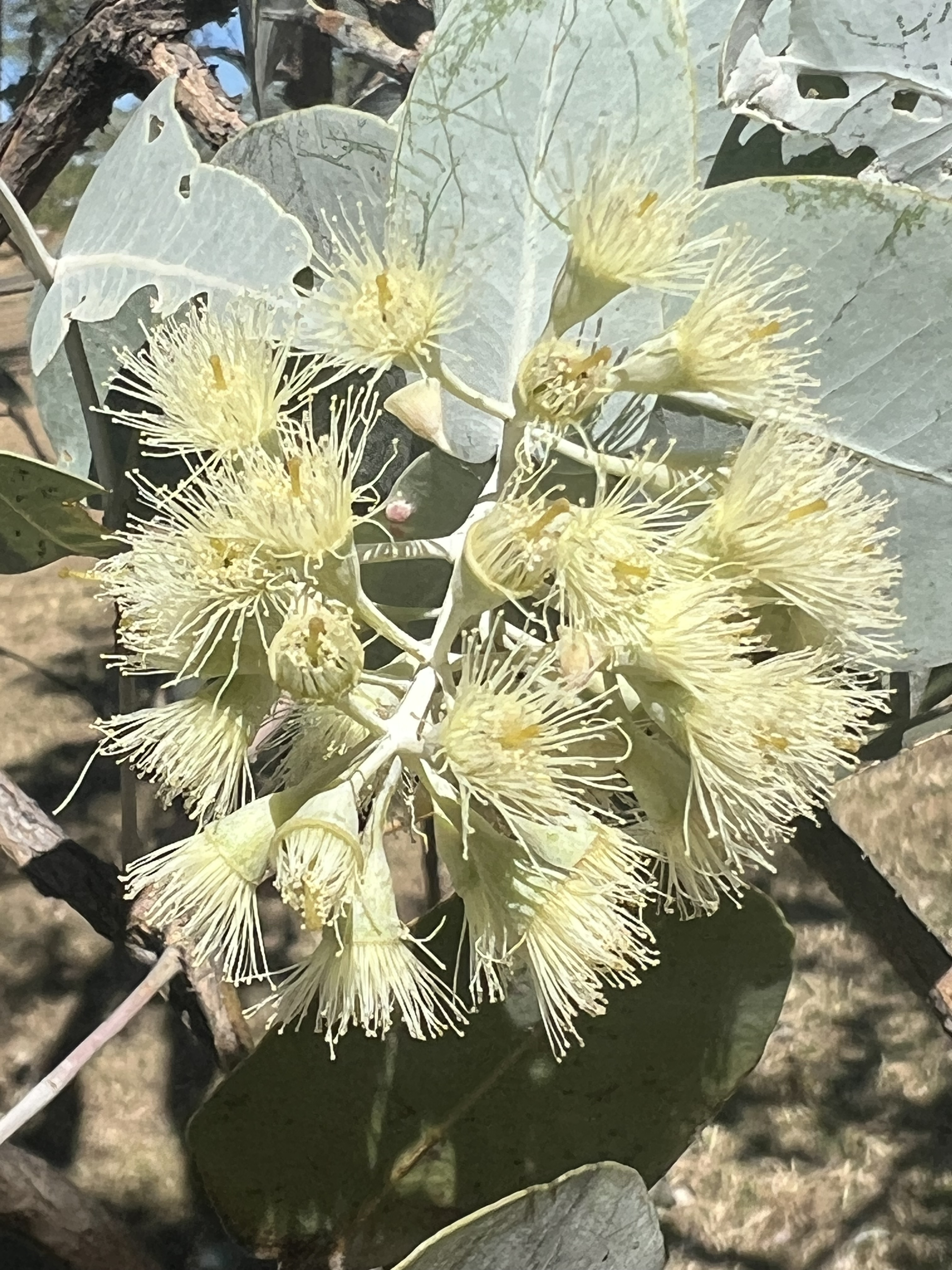
Flowers of Eucalyptus pruinosa

== Behaviour ==
The adults are flying mellivores. Flowering plants visited by the bees include Eucalyptus pruinosa and Eucalyptus argillacea.
