= Eucalyptus × lamprocalyx =

Scientific classification
- Kingdom: Plantae
- Clade: Tracheophytes
- Clade: Angiosperms
- Clade: Eudicots
- Clade: Rosids
- Order: Myrtales
- Family: Myrtaceae
- Genus: Eucalyptus
- Species: E. × lamprocalyx

Binomial name
- Eucalyptus × lamprocalyx Blakely

Synonyms
- Eucalyptus lamprocarpa Blakely nom. illeg.

Species of eucalyptus

Eucalyptus × lamprocalyx is a tree or shrub that is endemic to the Kimberley region of Western Australia. It has tessellated bark on its trunk and branches, sessile, broadly lance-shaped leaves arranged in opposite pairs, flower buds in groups of between seven and eleven, and oval or urn-shaped fruit. It is considered to be a natural hybrid between Corymbia cadophora and C. polycarpa.

== Description ==
Eucalyptus × lamprocalyx is a crooked, spreading tree or shrub that grows to a height of up to 6 m (20 ft). It has tessellated grayish bark on the trunk and branches. Adult leaves are arranged in opposite pairs, sessile, the same greyish green on both sides, broadly lance-shaped, 120–250 mm (4.7–9.8 in) long and 50–80 mm (2.0–3.1 in) wide. The flower buds are arranged in groups of between seven and eleven on a thick or slightly flattened peduncle 12–25 mm (0.5–1 in) long, with the individual buds on thick pedicels up to 3 mm (0.12 in) long. Mature buds are oval or pear-shaped, the floral cup 8–12 mm (0.31–0.47 in) long and 8–10 mm (0.31–0.39 in) wide, and the operculum hemispherical, 4–5 mm (0.16–0.20 in) long and 5–6 mm (0.2–0.2 in) wide, with a small point on the top. The fruit is a woody oval or urn-shaped capsule 30–40 mm (1.2–1.6 in) long and 20–30 mm (0.79–1.2 in) wide.

== Taxonomy and naming ==
Eucalyptus × lamprocalyx was first formally described in 1834 by William Blakely who gave it the name Eucalyptus lamprocalyx and published the description in his book, A Key to the Eucalypts. The Australian Plant Census considers this tree to be a natural hybrid between Corymbia cadophora and C. polycarpa, but it does not yet have a name in the genus Corymbia.

== Distribution and habitat ==
This eucalypt grows in woodland in the western Kimberley region of Western Australia.
