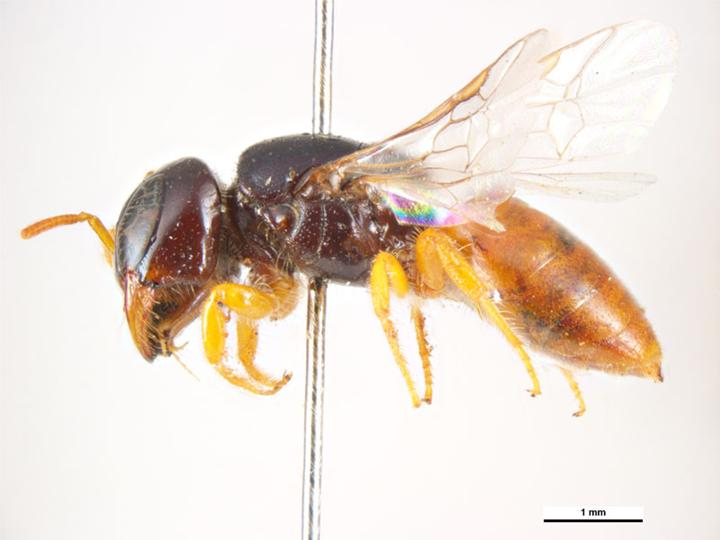
- Female

Scientific classification
- Kingdom: Animalia
- Phylum: Arthropoda
- Clade: Pancrustacea
- Class: Insecta
- Order: Hymenoptera
- Family: Colletidae
- Genus: Pachyprosopis
- Species: P. holoxanthopus

Binomial name
- Pachyprosopis holoxanthopus Cockerell, 1914

= Pachyprosopis holoxanthopus =

Species of bee

Pachyprosopis holoxanthopus, or Pachyprosopis (Pachyprosopis) holoxanthopus, is a species of bee in the family Colletidae and subfamily Euryglossinae. It is endemic to Australia. It was described by British-American entomologist Theodore Dru Alison Cockerell in 1914.

== Distribution and habitat ==
The species occurs in inland eastern Australia. The type locality is Yarrawin, New South Wales. It has also been recorded from Charleville, Queensland.

== Behaviour ==
The adults are flying mellivores. Flowering plants visited by the bees include Eucalyptus and Schinus species.

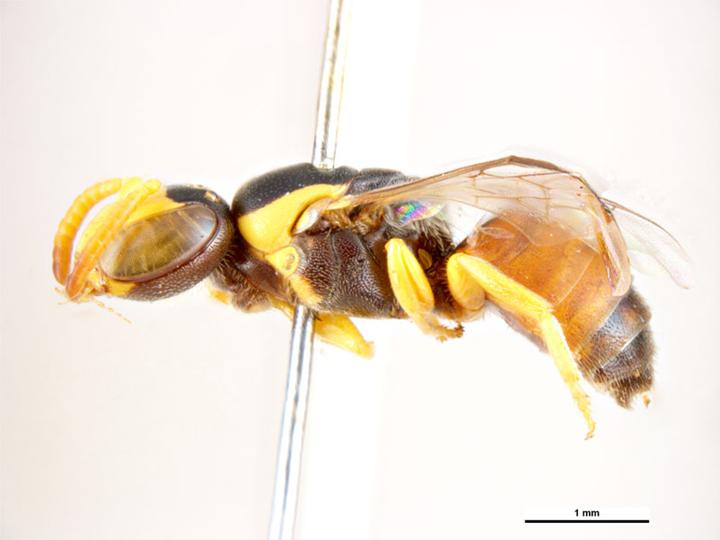
Male
