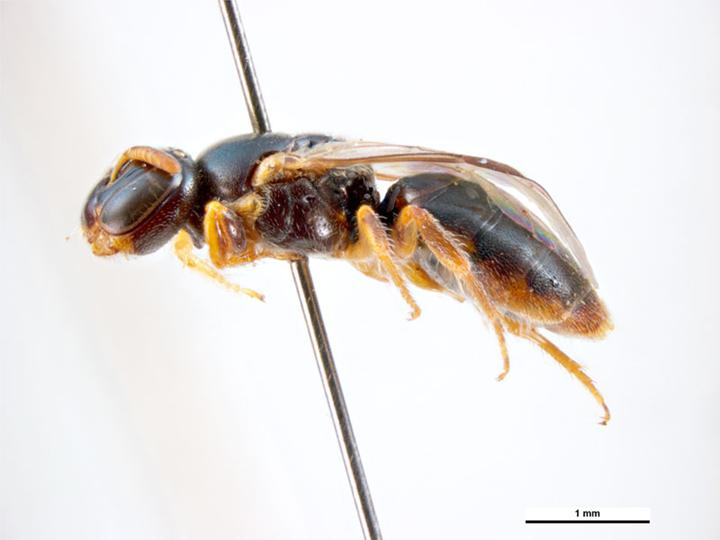
- Female

Scientific classification
- Kingdom: Animalia
- Phylum: Arthropoda
- Clade: Pancrustacea
- Class: Insecta
- Order: Hymenoptera
- Family: Colletidae
- Genus: Pachyprosopis
- Species: P. flavicauda

Binomial name
- Pachyprosopis flavicauda Cockerell, 1912

Synonyms
- Pachyprosopis humeralis Cockerell, 1912

= Pachyprosopis flavicauda =

Species of bee

Pachyprosopis flavicauda, or Pachyprosopis (Pachyprosopula) flavicauda, is a species of bee in the family Colletidae and subfamily Euryglossinae. It is endemic to Australia. It was described by British-American entomologist Theodore Dru Alison Cockerell in 1912.

== Distribution and habitat ==
The species occurs in eastern Australia. Type localities include Sydney.

== Behaviour ==
The adults are flying mellivores. Flowering plants visited by the bees include Angophora, Callistemon, Eucalyptus and Melaleuca species.

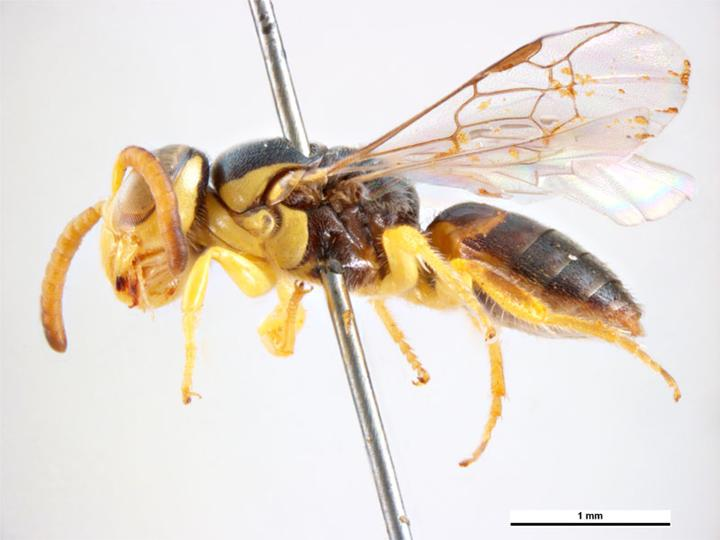
Male
