= Pachyprosopis georgica =

Scientific classification
- Kingdom: Animalia
- Phylum: Arthropoda
- Clade: Pancrustacea
- Class: Insecta
- Order: Hymenoptera
- Family: Colletidae
- Genus: Pachyprosopis
- Species: P. georgica

Binomial name
- Pachyprosopis georgica Cockerell, 1929

Species of bee

Pachyprosopis georgica, or Pachyprosopis (Pachyprosopis) georgica, is a species of bee in the family Colletidae and subfamily Euryglossinae. It is endemic to Australia. It was described by British-American entomologist Theodore Dru Alison Cockerell in 1929.

== Description ==
The body length of the holotype female is about 6.3 mm. The integumental colouring is mainly black, with reddish markings.

== Distribution and habitat ==
The species occurs in south-west Western Australia. The type locality is King George Sound.

== Behaviour ==
The adults are flying mellivores.
