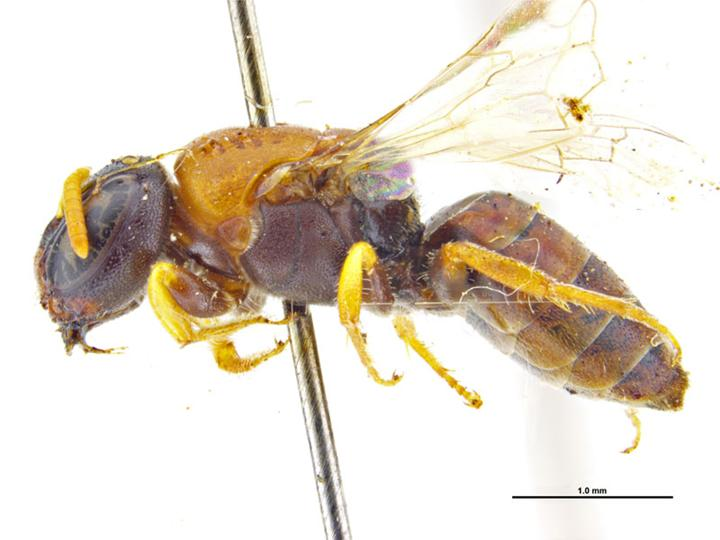
- Female

Scientific classification
- Kingdom: Animalia
- Phylum: Arthropoda
- Clade: Pancrustacea
- Class: Insecta
- Order: Hymenoptera
- Family: Colletidae
- Genus: Pachyprosopis
- Species: P. plebeia

Binomial name
- Pachyprosopis plebeia Cockerell, 1910

Synonyms
- Pachyprosopis doddi Cockerell, 1910

= Pachyprosopis plebeia =

Species of bee

Pachyprosopis plebeia, or Pachyprosopis (Parapachyprosopis) plebeia, is a species of bee in the family Colletidae and subfamily Euryglossinae. It is endemic to Australia. It was described by British-American entomologist Theodore Dru Alison Cockerell in 1910.

== Distribution and habitat ==
The species occurs in eastern Queensland. Type localities include Mackay and Townsville.

== Behaviour ==
The adults are flying mellivores. Flowering plants visited by the bees include Eucalyptus species.

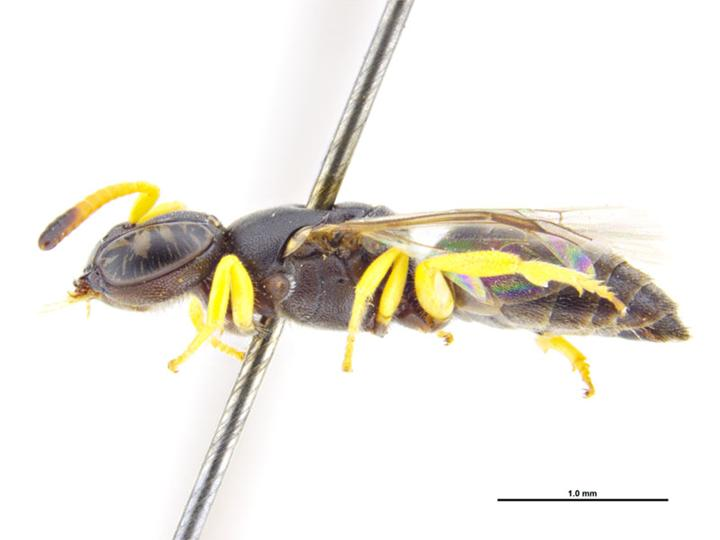
Male
