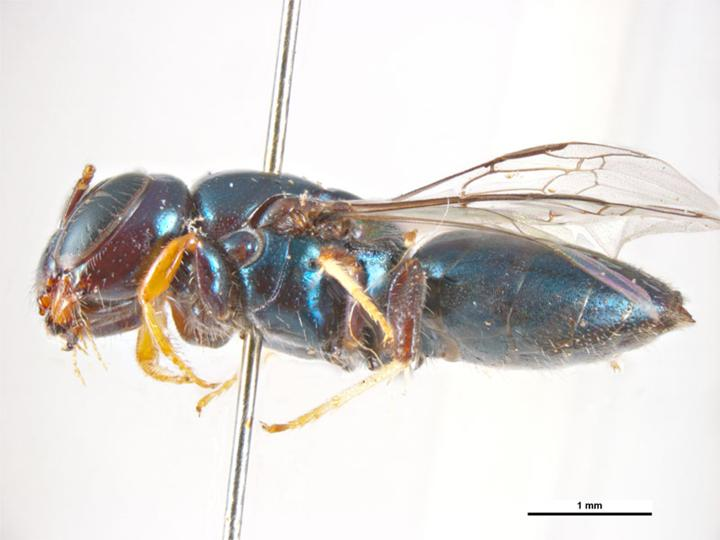
- Female

Scientific classification
- Kingdom: Animalia
- Phylum: Arthropoda
- Clade: Pancrustacea
- Class: Insecta
- Order: Hymenoptera
- Family: Colletidae
- Genus: Pachyprosopis
- Species: P. haematostoma

Binomial name
- Pachyprosopis haematostoma Cockerell, 1913

Synonyms
- Pachyprosopis aurantipes Cockerell, 1913

= Pachyprosopis haematostoma =

Species of bee

Pachyprosopis haematostoma, or Pachyprosopis (Pachyprosopis) haematostoma, is a species of bee in the family Colletidae and subfamily Euryglossinae. It is endemic to Australia. It was described by British-American entomologist Theodore Dru Alison Cockerell in 1913.

== Distribution and habitat ==
The species occurs in western and eastern Australia. Type localities include Croydon and Windsor in Victoria.

== Behaviour ==
The adults are solitary flying mellivores, with sedentary larvae, that nest in burrows in tree stumps. Flowering plants visited by the bees include Angophora, Callistemon, Eucalyptus Jacksonia, Leptospermum, Melaleuca and Tristaniopsis species.

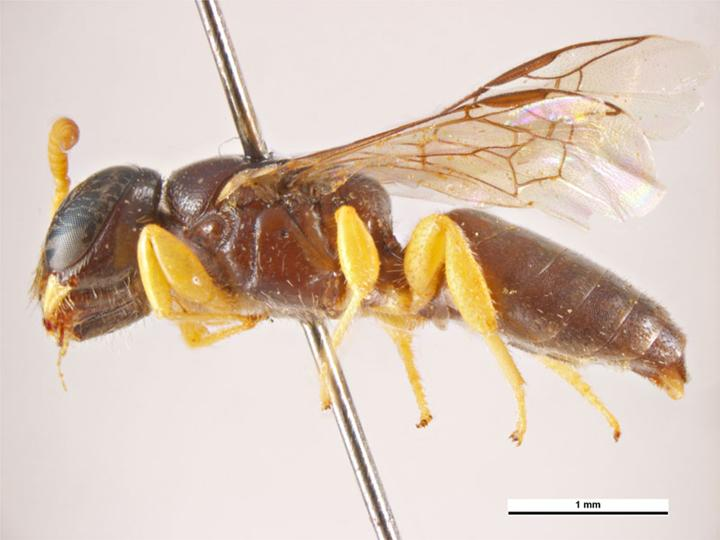
Male
