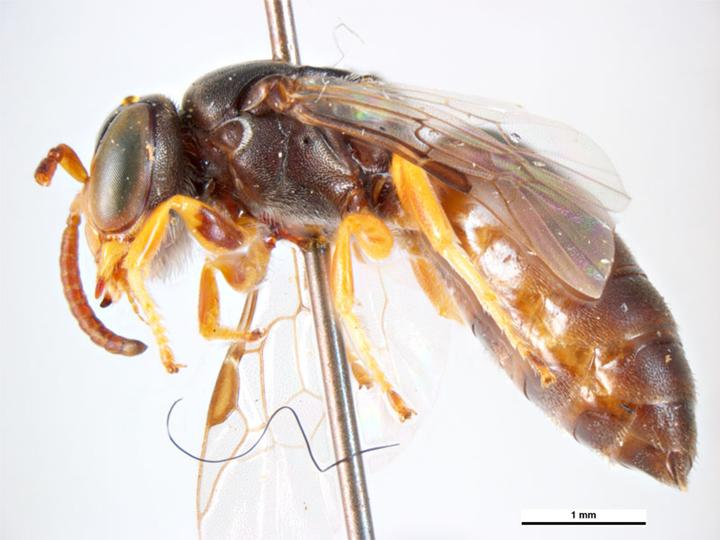
- Female

Scientific classification
- Kingdom: Animalia
- Phylum: Arthropoda
- Clade: Pancrustacea
- Class: Insecta
- Order: Hymenoptera
- Family: Colletidae
- Genus: Pachyprosopis
- Species: P. indicans

Binomial name
- Pachyprosopis indicans Cockerell, 1918

= Pachyprosopis indicans =

Species of bee

Pachyprosopis indicans, or Pachyprosopis (Parapachyprosopis) indicans, is a species of bee in the family Colletidae and subfamily Euryglossinae. It is endemic to Australia. It was described by British-American entomologist Theodore Dru Alison Cockerell in 1918.

== Description ==
The body length of the holotype male is about 5 mm. The integumental colouring is mainly black, with yellow markings.

== Distribution and habitat ==
The species occurs in eastern Australia. The type locality is Brisbane.

== Behaviour ==
The adults are solitary flying mellivores that nest in soil in hollow trees. Flowering plants visited by the bees include Angophora species.

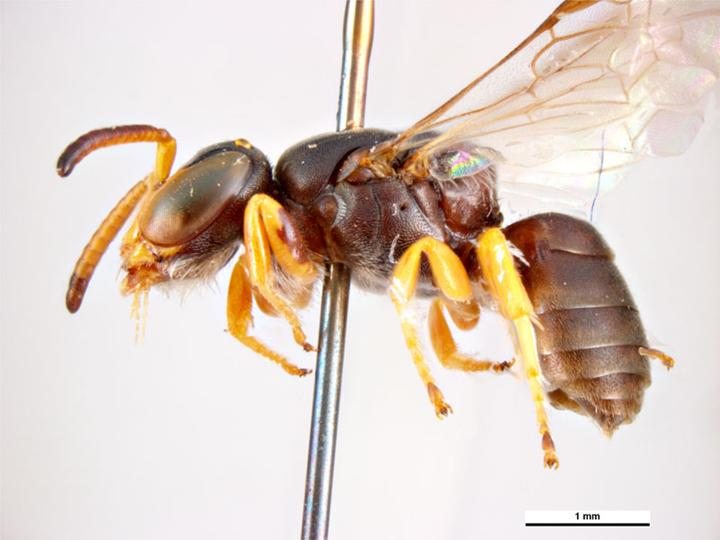
Male
