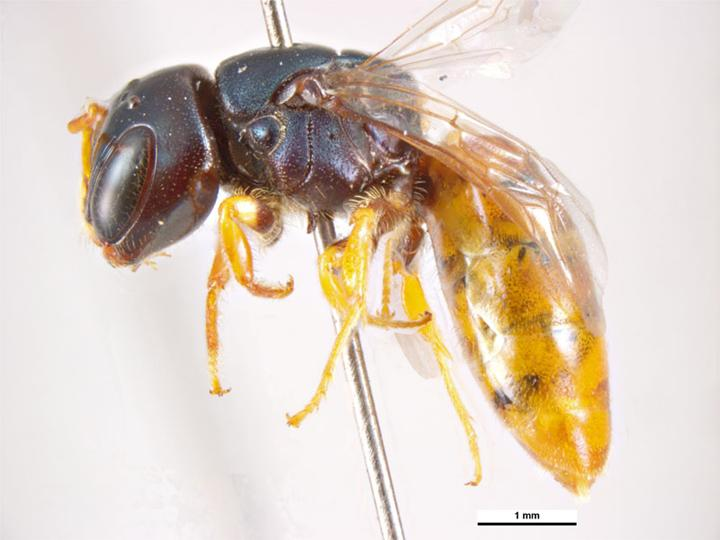
- Female

Scientific classification
- Kingdom: Animalia
- Phylum: Arthropoda
- Clade: Pancrustacea
- Class: Insecta
- Order: Hymenoptera
- Family: Colletidae
- Genus: Pachyprosopis
- Species: P. mirabilis

Binomial name
- Pachyprosopis mirabilis Perkins, 1908

= Pachyprosopis mirabilis =

Species of bee

Pachyprosopis mirabilis, or Pachyprosopis (Pachyprosopis) mirabilis, is a species of bee in the family Colletidae and subfamily Euryglossinae. It is endemic to Australia. It was described by British entomologist Robert Cyril Layton Perkins in 1908.

== Description ==
The female body length is 5 mm. Integumental colouration is mainly black, with ferruginous and yellow markings.

== Distribution and habitat ==
The species occurs over much of Australia. The type locality is given simply as North Queensland, without further location details.

== Behaviour ==
The adults are flying mellivores. Flowering plants visited by the bees include Angophora, Callistemon, Eucalyptus, Leptospermum, Lomatia, Melaleuca and Tristaniopsis species.

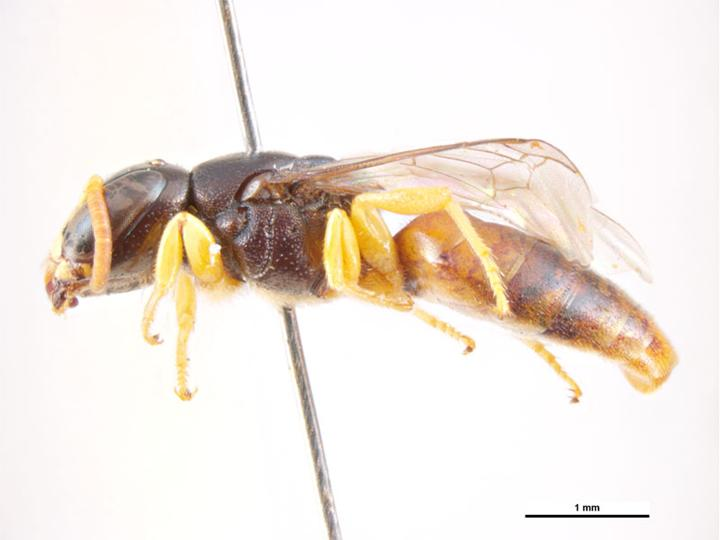
Male
