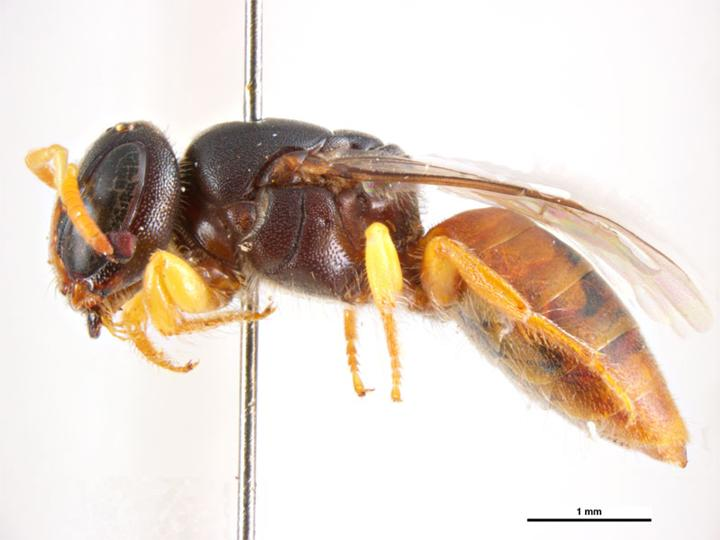
- Female

Scientific classification
- Kingdom: Animalia
- Phylum: Arthropoda
- Clade: Pancrustacea
- Class: Insecta
- Order: Hymenoptera
- Family: Colletidae
- Genus: Pachyprosopis
- Species: P. sternotricha

Binomial name
- Pachyprosopis sternotricha Exley, 1972

= Pachyprosopis sternotricha =

Species of bee

Pachyprosopis sternotricha, or Pachyprosopis (Parapachyprosopis) sternotricha, is a species of bee in the family Colletidae and subfamily Euryglossinae. It is endemic to Australia. It was described by Australian entomologist Elizabeth Exley in 1972.

== Distribution and habitat ==
The species occurs across tropical northern Australia. The type locality is Mount Bundey Road via Darwin, Northern Territory.

== Behaviour ==
The adults are flying mellivores. Flowering plants visited by the bees include Eucalyptus species.

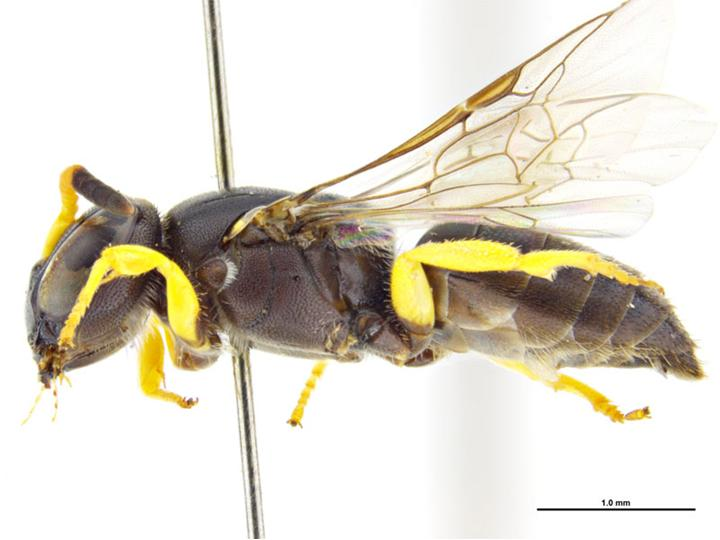
Male
