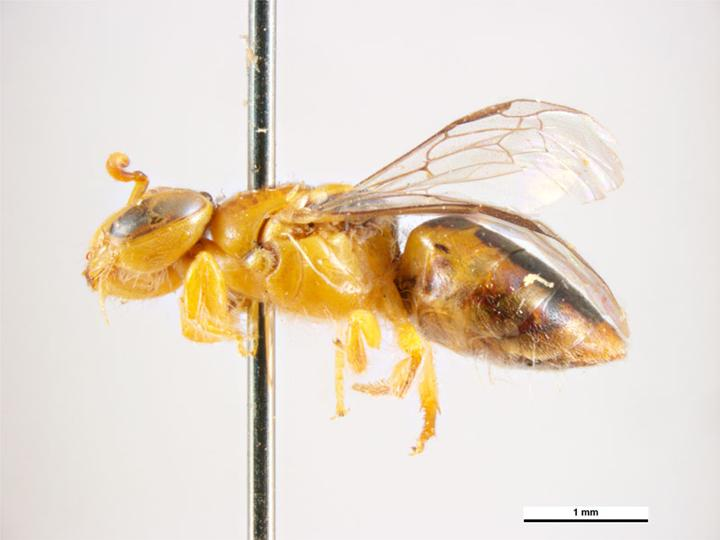
- Female

Scientific classification
- Kingdom: Animalia
- Phylum: Arthropoda
- Clade: Pancrustacea
- Class: Insecta
- Order: Hymenoptera
- Family: Colletidae
- Genus: Pachyprosopis
- Species: P. purnongensis

Binomial name
- Pachyprosopis purnongensis Rayment, 1928

Synonyms
- Euryglossina purnongensis Rayment, 1928

= Pachyprosopis purnongensis =

Species of bee

Pachyprosopis purnongensis, or Pachyprosopis (Pachyprosopula) purnongensis, is a species of bee in the family Colletidae and subfamily Euryglossinae. It is endemic to Australia. It was described by Australian entomologist Tarlton Rayment in 1928.

== Distribution and habitat ==
The species occurs in southern Australia. The type locality is Purnong, South Australia. It has also been recorded from Greenmount, Western Australia.

== Behaviour ==
The adults are flying mellivores. Flowering plants visited by the bees include Eucalyptus species.

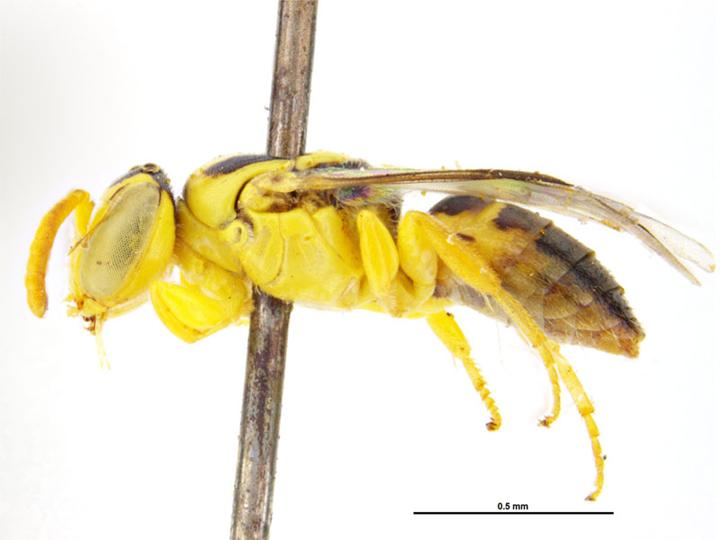
Male
