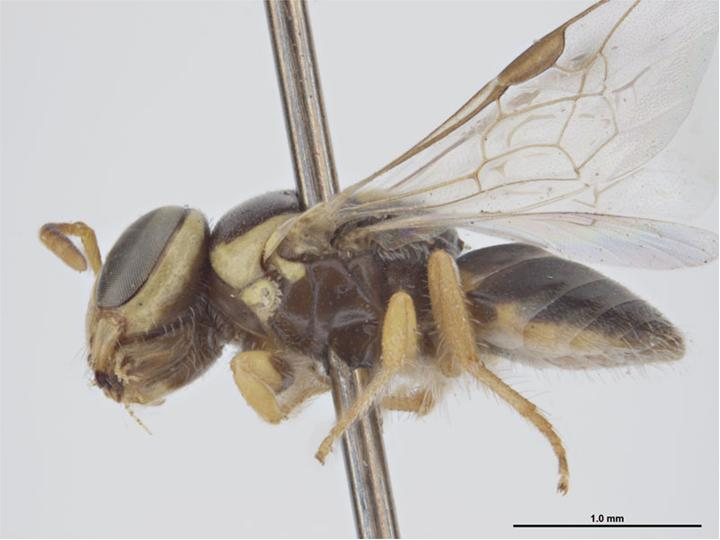
- Female

Scientific classification
- Kingdom: Animalia
- Phylum: Arthropoda
- Clade: Pancrustacea
- Class: Insecta
- Order: Hymenoptera
- Family: Colletidae
- Genus: Pachyprosopis
- Species: P. xanthodonta

Binomial name
- Pachyprosopis xanthodonta Cockerell, 1913

Synonyms
- Pachyprosopis saturnina Cockerell, 1913

= Pachyprosopis xanthodonta =

Species of bee

Pachyprosopis xanthodonta, or Pachyprosopis (Pachyprosopula) xanthodonta, is a species of bee in the family Colletidae and subfamily Euryglossinae. It is endemic to Australia. It was described by British-American entomologist Theodore Dru Alison Cockerell in 1913.

== Distribution and habitat ==
The species occurs across much of Australia. Type localities include Purnong, South Australia.

== Behaviour ==
The adults are flying mellivores. Flowering plants visited by the bees include Eucalyptus species.

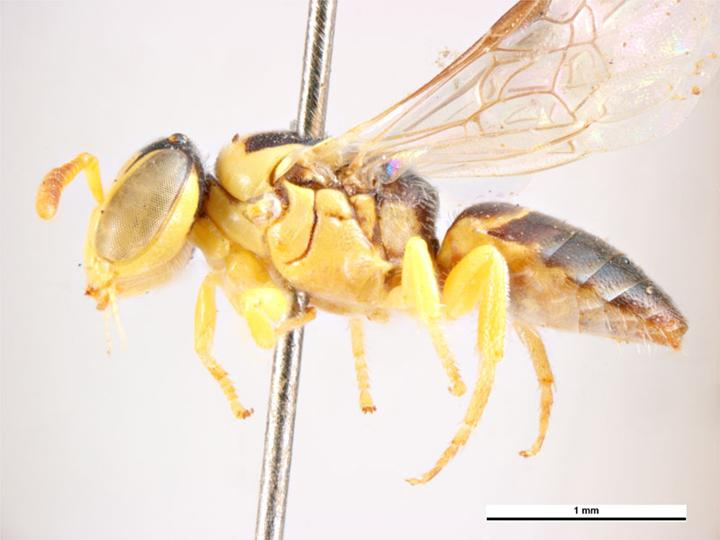
Male
