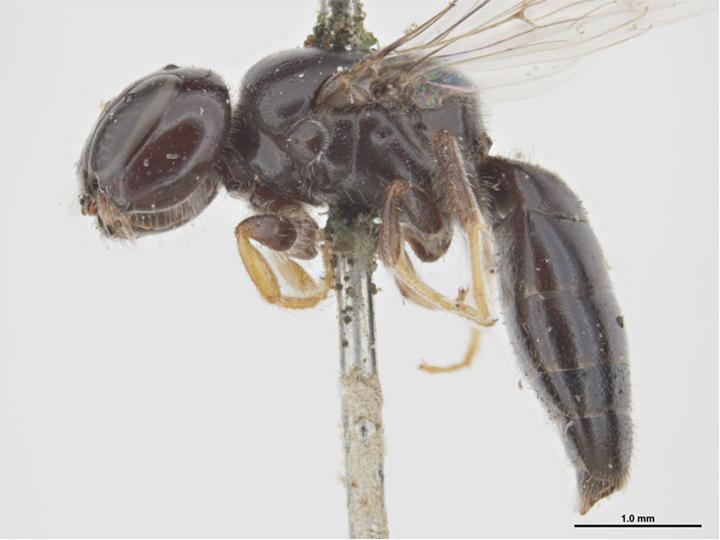
- Female

Scientific classification
- Kingdom: Animalia
- Phylum: Arthropoda
- Clade: Pancrustacea
- Class: Insecta
- Order: Hymenoptera
- Family: Colletidae
- Genus: Pachyprosopis
- Species: P. hackeri

Binomial name
- Pachyprosopis hackeri Cockerell, 1916

= Pachyprosopis hackeri =

Species of bee

Pachyprosopis hackeri, or Pachyprosopis (Pachyprosopis) hackeri, is a species of bee in the family Colletidae and subfamily Euryglossinae. It is endemic to Australia. It was described by British-American entomologist Theodore Dru Alison Cockerell in 1916.

== Description ==
Body length of the holotype female is about 5 mm. Integumental colouration is mainly black and glossy.

== Distribution and habitat ==
The species occurs in eastern Australia. The type locality is Oxley in Brisbane. It has also been recorded from Stanthorpe, Queensland.

== Behaviour ==
The adults are flying mellivores.
