= Pachyprosopis flava =

Scientific classification
- Kingdom: Animalia
- Phylum: Arthropoda
- Clade: Pancrustacea
- Class: Insecta
- Order: Hymenoptera
- Family: Colletidae
- Genus: Pachyprosopis
- Species: P. flava

Binomial name
- Pachyprosopis flava Exley, 1976

Species of bee

Pachyprosopis flava, or Pachyprosopis (Pachyprosopula) flava, is a species of bee in the family Colletidae and subfamily Euryglossinae. It is endemic to Australia. It was described by Australian entomologist Elizabeth Exley in 1976.

== Etymology ==
The specific epithet flava (Latin: yellow) refers to colouration.

== Description ==
Female body length is about 4.0 mm, wing length 2.9 mm; male body length 4.0, wing length 2.4 mm. Integumental colouration is mainly yellow with brown markings; the hair is mostly white.

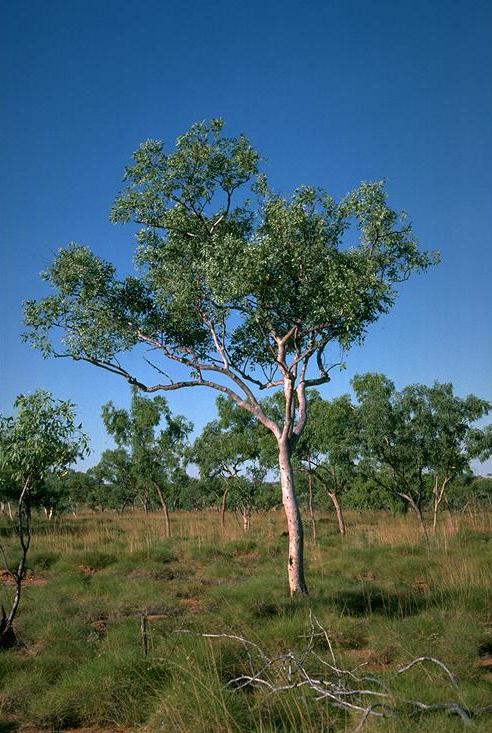
Eucalyptus brevifolia (northern white gum), a forage plant of the bees

== Distribution and habitat ==
The species occurs in inland northern Australia. The type locality is Lake Moondarra, near Mount Isa in the Gulf Country of north-west Queensland. It has also been recorded from 50 km west-south-west of Wave Hill in the Northern Territory.

== Behaviour ==
The adults are flying mellivores. Flowering plants visited by the bees include Eucalyptus brevifolia.
