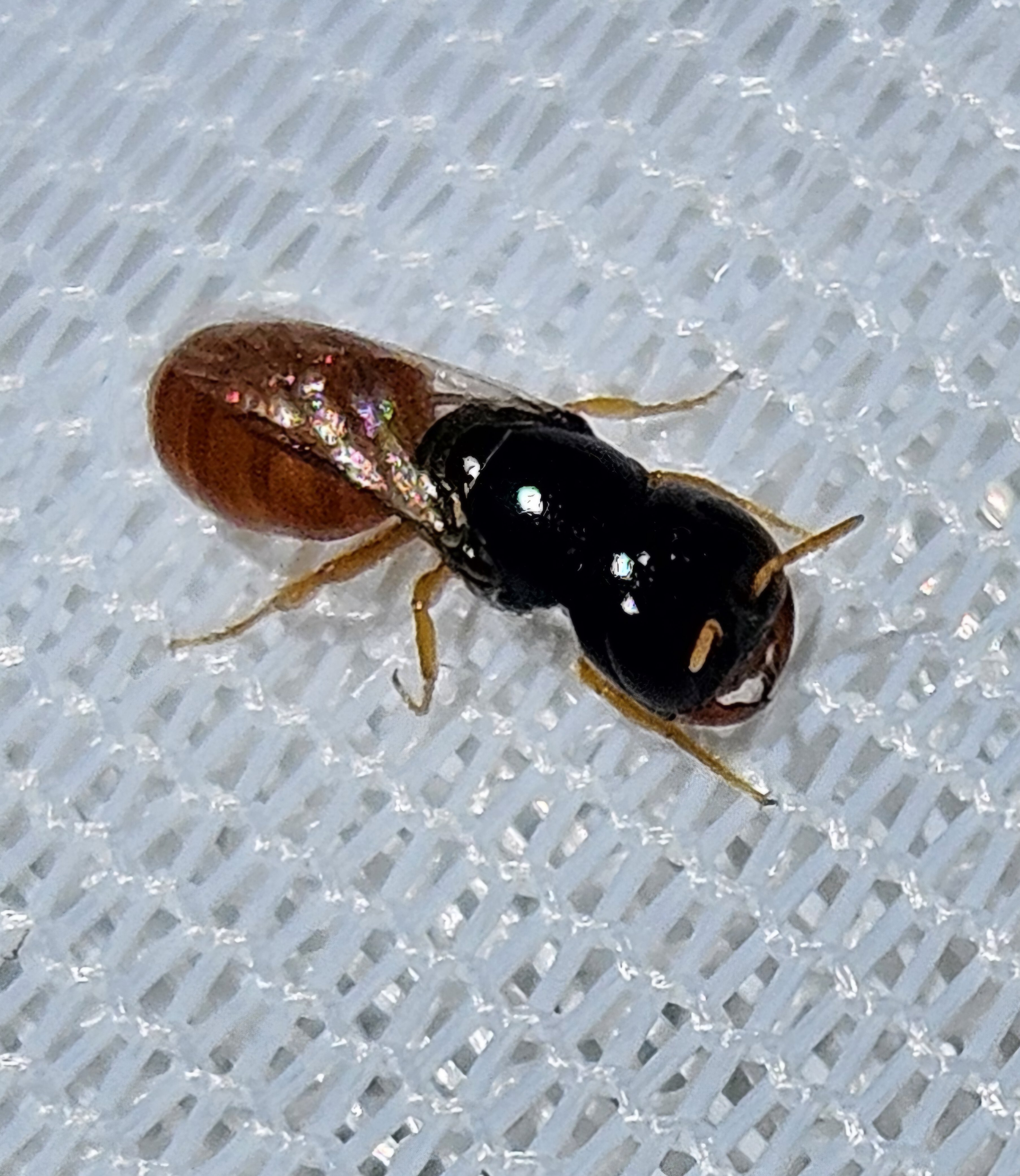
- Pachyprosopis sp.

Scientific classification
- Kingdom: Animalia
- Phylum: Arthropoda
- Clade: Pancrustacea
- Class: Insecta
- Order: Hymenoptera
- Superfamily: Apoidea
- Clade: Anthophila
- Family: Colletidae
- Subfamily: Euryglossinae
- Genus: Pachyprosopis; Perkins, 1908

= Pachyprosopis =

Genus of bees

Pachyprosopis is a genus of bees, also known as naked bees, in the family Colletidae and subfamily Euryglossinae. It comprises 23 species in three subgenera. These bees are endemic to Australia, with records from all states and territories. They have a robust build, are almost hairless, and are usually around 4–7 mm long. In almost every species, the female has an apical spine on the labrum, and most species exhibit strong sexual dimorphism. They almost exclusively visit flowers from the Myrtaceae family. They have been recorded nesting in beetle burrows in an old tree stump, as well as in termite soil in eucalypt hollows.

Face of Pachyprosopis cornuta

== Species ==
As of 2026 the genus contained 23 valid species in three subgenera: Pachyprosopis, Pachyprosopula, and Parapachyprosopis:

- Pachyprosopis angophorae Cockerell, 1912
- Pachyprosopis cornuta Exley, 1972
- Pachyprosopis eucalypti Exley, 1972
- Pachyprosopis eucyrta Exley, 1972
- Pachyprosopis flava Exley, 1976
- Pachyprosopis flavicauda Cockerell, 1912
- Pachyprosopis georgica Cockerell, 1929
- Pachyprosopis grossoscapus Exley, 1976
- Pachyprosopis hackeri Cockerell, 1916
- Pachyprosopis haematostoma Cockerell, 1913
- Pachyprosopis holoxanthopus Cockerell, 1914
- Pachyprosopis indicans Cockerell, 1918
- Pachyprosopis kellyi Cockerell, 1916
- Pachyprosopis kununurra Exley, 1976
- Pachyprosopis melanognathus Exley, 1976
- Pachyprosopis mirabilis Perkins, 1908
- Pachyprosopis plebeia Cockerell, 1910
- Pachyprosopis psilosomata Exley, 1972
- Pachyprosopis purnongensis Rayment, 1928
- Pachyprosopis sternotricha Exley, 1972
- Pachyprosopis trichopoda Exley, 1972
- Pachyprosopis xanthodonta Cockerell, 1913
- Pachyprosopis xanthometopa Exley, 1972
