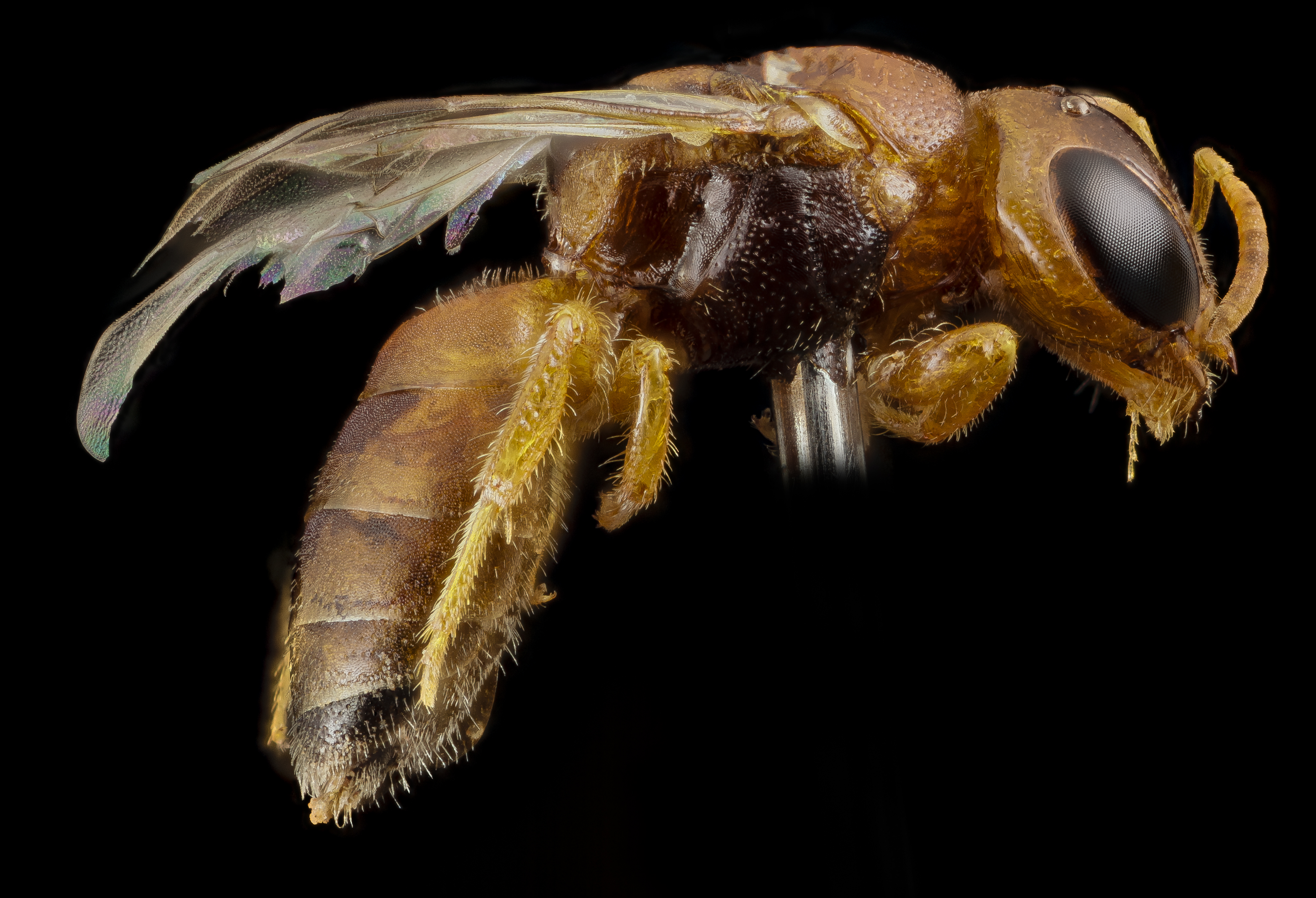
- Female, lateral view

Scientific classification
- Kingdom: Animalia
- Phylum: Arthropoda
- Clade: Pancrustacea
- Class: Insecta
- Order: Hymenoptera
- Family: Colletidae
- Genus: Pachyprosopis
- Species: P. cornuta

Binomial name
- Pachyprosopis cornuta Exley, 1972

= Pachyprosopis cornuta =

Species of bee

Pachyprosopis cornuta, or Pachyprosopis (Pachyprosopis) cornuta, also known as the horned naked bee, is a species of bee in the family Colletidae and subfamily Euryglossinae. It is endemic to Australia. It was described by Australian entomologist Elizabeth Exley in 1972.

== Distribution and habitat ==
The species occurs in Western Australia. The type locality is Spargoville, some 45 km west of Coolgardie.

== Behaviour ==
The adults are flying mellivores.

Female, dorsal view
