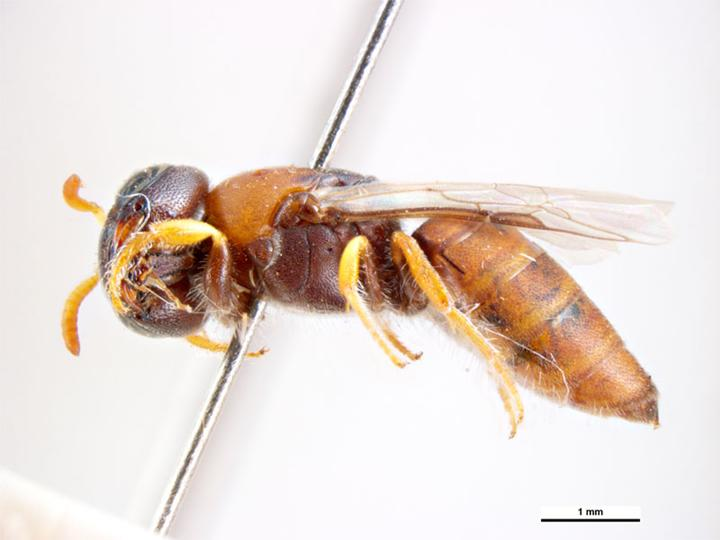
- Female

Scientific classification
- Kingdom: Animalia
- Phylum: Arthropoda
- Clade: Pancrustacea
- Class: Insecta
- Order: Hymenoptera
- Family: Colletidae
- Genus: Pachyprosopis
- Species: P. angophorae

Binomial name
- Pachyprosopis angophorae Cockerell, 1912

Synonyms
- Pachyprosopis obesa Cockerell, 1912

= Pachyprosopis angophorae =

Species of bee

Pachyprosopis angophorae, or Pachyprosopis (Parapachyprosopis) angophorae, is a species of bee in the family Colletidae and subfamily Euryglossinae. It is endemic to Australia. It was described by British-American entomologist Theodore Dru Alison Cockerell in 1912.

== Distribution and habitat ==
The species occurs in northern and eastern Australia. Type localities include Sydney.

== Behaviour ==
The adults are flying mellivores that nest in termite soil at the bases of, or within, hollow trees. Flowering plants visited by the bees include Angophora, Eucalyptus and Lomatia species.

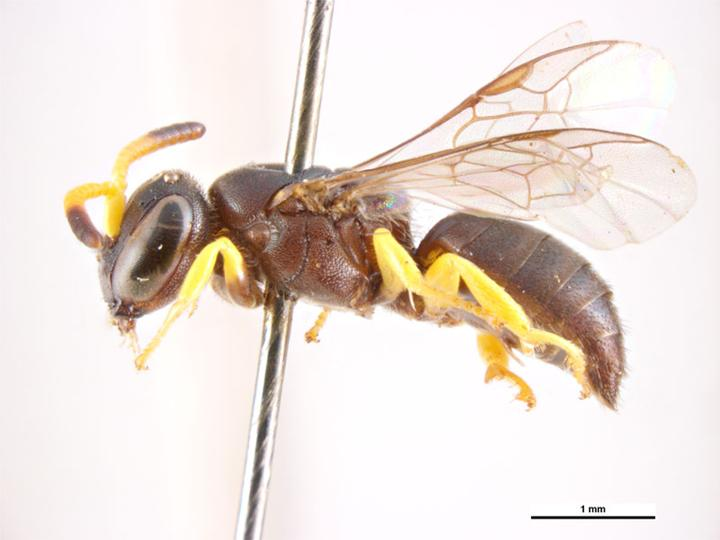
Male
