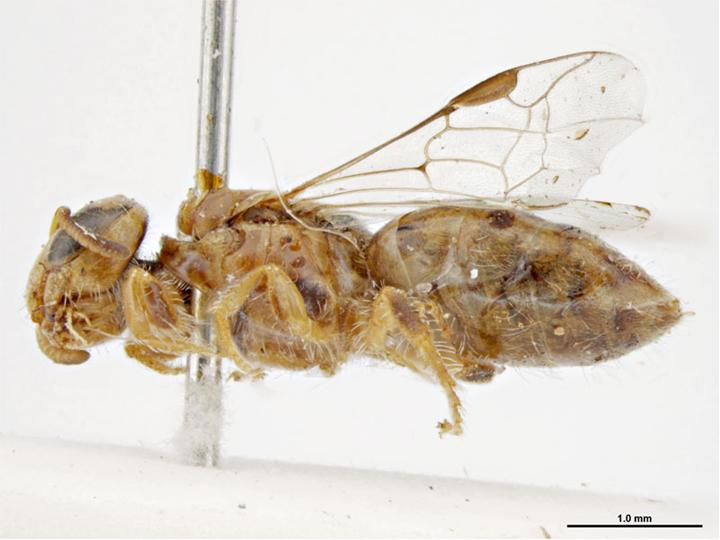
- Female

Scientific classification
- Kingdom: Animalia
- Phylum: Arthropoda
- Clade: Pancrustacea
- Class: Insecta
- Order: Hymenoptera
- Family: Colletidae
- Genus: Pachyprosopis
- Species: P. kellyi

Binomial name
- Pachyprosopis kellyi Cockerell, 1916

Synonyms
- Pachyprosopis angulifera Cockerell, 1929; Pachyprosopis strigata Rayment, 1935; Pachyprosopis fulvescens Rayment, 1935

= Pachyprosopis kellyi =

Species of bee

Pachyprosopis kellyi, or Pachyprosopis (Pachyprosopula) kellyi, is a species of bee in the family Colletidae and subfamily Euryglossinae. It is endemic to Australia. It was described by British-American entomologist Theodore Dru Alison Cockerell in 1916.

== Distribution and habitat ==
The species occurs in eastern Australia. Type localities include Mount Yule near Healesville and Sandringham in Victoria, and Lamington National Park in south-east Queensland.

== Behaviour ==
The adults are flying mellivores. Flowering plants visited by the bees include Eucalyptus species.

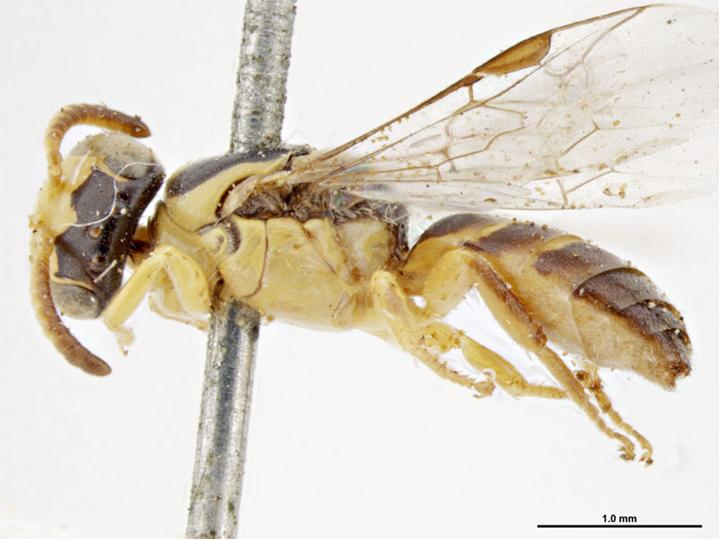
Male
