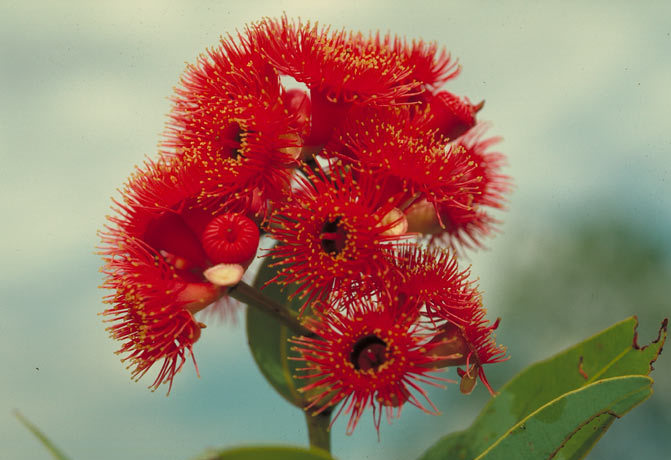

Scientific classification
- Kingdom: Plantae
- Clade: Embryophytes
- Clade: Tracheophytes
- Clade: Spermatophytes
- Clade: Angiosperms
- Clade: Eudicots
- Clade: Rosids
- Order: Myrtales
- Family: Myrtaceae
- Genus: Corymbia
- Species: C. cadophora

Binomial name
- Corymbia cadophora K.D.Hill & L.A.S.Johnson

Synonyms
- Eucalyptus cadophora (K.D.Hill & L.A.S. Johnson) Brooker; Eucalyptus perfoliata R.Br. ex Benth.

= Corymbia cadophora =

Twinleaf bloodwood

Species of plant

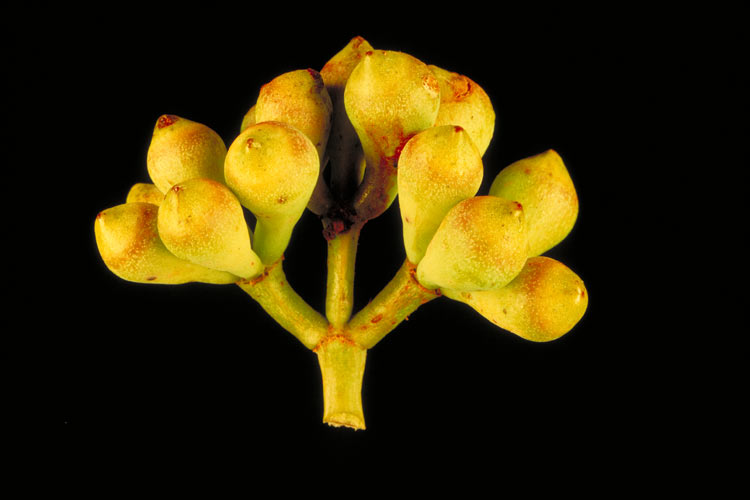
Flower buds

Corymbia cadophora, commonly known as twinleaf bloodwood, is a species of small, straggly tree that is endemic to the Kimberley region of Western Australia. It has rough bark on the trunk and branches, a crown of sessile, egg-shaped or lance-shaped leaves joined in opposite pairs, flower buds mostly arranged in groups of seven, creamy white to pink or red flowers and urn-shaped to barrel-shaped fruit.

== Description ==
Corymbia cadophora is a tree, usually of poor form, that typically grows to a height of 2 to 8 metres (7 to 26 ft) and forms a lignotuber. It has thick, rough, greyish brown, tessellated bark on the trunk and branches. Young plants and coppice regrowth have leaves that are about 80 mm (3.1 in) long, 40 mm (1.6 in) wide and arranged in opposite pairs. The crown is composed of juvenile leaves that are sessile, the same shade of dull green on both sides, egg-shaped to lance-shaped, 95–255 mm (3.7–10.0 in) long, 30–86 mm (1.2–3.4 in) wide and arranged in opposite pairs with their bases joined. The flower buds are arranged on the ends of branchlets on a branched peduncle 5–30 mm (0.20–1.18 in) long, each branch of the peduncle with buds usually in groups of seven on pedicels up to 5 mm (0.20 in) long. Mature buds are oval to pear-shaped, 8–18 mm (0.31–0.71 in) long and 6–11 mm (0.24–0.43 in) wide with a rounded, pointed or beaked operculum. Flowering occurs from January to February or April, or from June or August to October and the flowers are creamy white to pinkish or red. The fruit is a woody urn-shaped to barrel-shaped capsule 30–42 mm (1.2–1.7 in) long and 23–30 mm (0.91–1.18 in) wide with the valves enclosed in the fruit.

== Taxonomy and naming ==
Eucalyptus cadophora was first formally described in 1995 by the botanists Kenneth Hill and Lawrence Alexander Sidney Johnson in the journal Telopea. In the same journal, Hill and John described two subspecies and in 2007 Russell Barrett described a further subspecies. The names of the three subspecies have been accepted by the Australian Plant Census:

- Corymbia cadophora K.D.Hill & L.A.S.Johnson subsp. cadophora is a robust tree, usually broader than high, with flowers that are usually cream-coloured, and fruit that are 25–36 mm (0.98–1.42 in) long and 22–26 mm (0.87–1.02 in) wide;
- Corymbia cadophora subsp. pliantha K.D.Hill & L.A.S.Johnson has flowers that are deep red or dark pink, between seven and twenty-three groups of flowers for each peduncle, and fruit that are 25–36 mm (0.98–1.42 in) long and 22–26 mm (0.87–1.02 in) wide;
- Corymbia cadophora subsp. polychroma R.L.Barrett has flowers that are pink at the base of the stamens or cream-coloured and fruit that are 30–38 mm (1.2–1.5 in) long and 18–23 mm (0.71–0.91 in) wide.

The specific epithet (cadophora) is derived from Greek kados meaning "a vase or wine-jar" and phoros "bearing", referring to the shape of the fruit. The epithet plianthus is from Greek pleios meaning "more" and anthos meaning "a flower" referring to the more numerous flowers, and polychroma from Greek meaning "many" and "coloured", referring to the variation in flower colour.

== Distribution and habitat ==
Twin-leaf bloodwood is endemic to the Kimberley region of Western Australia where it is found on rocky slopes and hills and dunes and on floodplains where it grows on sandy clay loam or loamy soils over or around basalt, dolerite, sandstone and quartzite. Subspecies cadophora is widespread and locally abundant from near Derby to near Fitzroy Crossing and the Prince Regent River area, growing in low, open shrubland. Subspecies pliantha is only known from a small area south of Kununurra where it grows in low, open, grassy woodland and subspecies polychroma is only known from a small area in the Ragged Range, growing with Triodia species.

== Conservation status ==
Subspecies cadophora and pliantha are classified as "not threatened" by the Western Australian Government Department of Parks and Wildlife but subspecies polychroma is classified as "Priority One", meaning that it is known from only one or a few locations which are potentially at risk.

== See also ==
- List of Corymbia species
