= Allotype =

Allotype may refer to:

- In zoological nomenclature, a designated paratype that is a specimen of the opposite sex to the holotype
- In biology, a variant protein sequence that is genetically determined, particularly:
  - In immunology, an immunoglobulin allotype

== See also ==
- Type (biology)
- Lectotype (zoology)
- Syntype (zoology)
