= Australian cuisine =

Culinary traditions of Australia

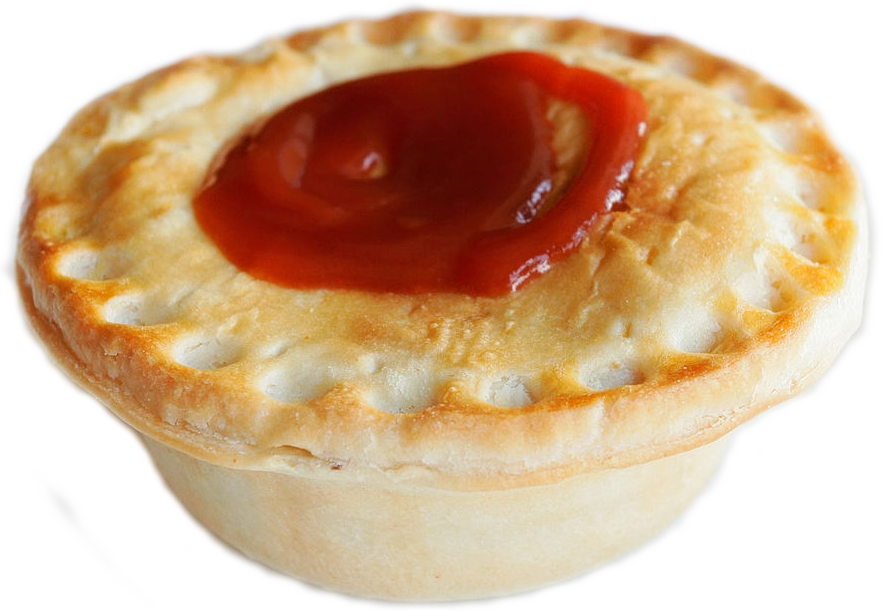
- A typical Australian meat pie with tomato sauce
- Country or region: Australia
- Regional varieties: Christmas Island, Norfolk Island, Tasmanian, other regional cuisines
- National dishes: Fish and chips, meat pie, sausage sizzle, Vegemite
- National drinks: Beer, coffee, lemonade, wine
- See also: Beer in Australia, bush tucker, coffee in Australia, list of Australian dishes, list of restaurants in Australia, pub food, wine in Australia

Australian cuisine is the food and cooking practices of Australia and its inhabitants. Australia has absorbed culinary contributions and adaptations from various cultures around the world, including British, European, Asian, and Middle Eastern.

Indigenous Australians have occupied Australia for some 65,000 years, during which they developed a unique hunter-gatherer diet, known as bush tucker, drawn from regional Australian plants and animals. Australia became a collection of British colonies from 1788 to 1900, during which time culinary tastes were strongly influenced by British and Irish migrants, with agricultural products such as beef cattle, sheep, and wheat becoming staples in the local diet. The Australian gold rushes introduced more varied immigrants and cuisines, mainly Italian and Chinese, whilst post-war immigration programs led to a large-scale diversification of local food, mainly due to the influence of migrants from the Mediterranean, East Asia and South Asia.

Australian cuisine in the 21st century reflects the influence of globalisation, with many fast-food restaurants and international trends becoming influential. Organic and biodynamic foods have also become widely available alongside a revival of interest in bush tucker. Australia exports many agricultural products, including cattle, sheep, poultry, milk, vegetables, fruit, nuts, wheat, barley, and canola. Australia also produces wine, beer and soft drinks.

While fast food chains are abundant, Australia's metropolitan areas have restaurants that offer both local and international foods. Restaurants which include contemporary adaptations, interpretations or fusions of exotic influences are frequently termed Modern Australian.

== History ==
=== Indigenous Australian bush food ===
Indigenous Australians have lived off native flora and fauna of the Australian bush for over 60,000 years. In modern times, this collection of foods and customs has become known as bush tucker. It is understood that Indigenous Australians ate up to 5,000 species of Australian flora and fauna. Hunting of kangaroo, wallaby and emu was common, with other foods widely consumed including bogong moths, witchetty grubs, lizards and snakes. Bush berries, fruits, and nuts were also used, including the now widely cultivated macadamia nut, and wild honeys were also exploited. Fish were caught using tools such as spears, hooks, and traps; in some areas, the construction of complex weir systems allowed the development of forms of aquaculture.

Resource availability and dietary composition varied across regions, and scientific theories that bush tucker plants were spread by hand have recently emerged. Food preparation techniques also varied; however, a common cooking technique was for the carcass to be thrown directly on a campfire to be roasted. Native food sources were used to supplement the colonists' diet following the arrival of the First Fleet in Botany Bay in 1788.

Australian bush tucker
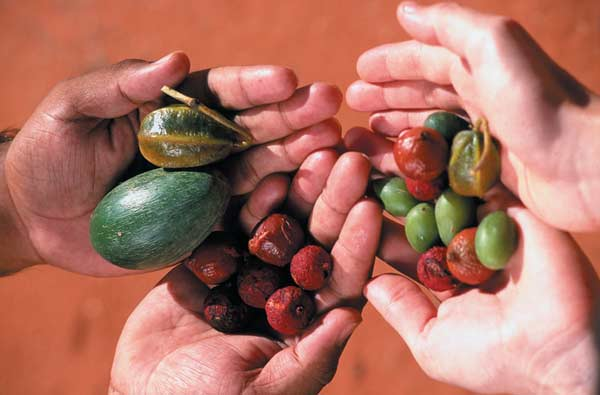
Bush tucker fruits

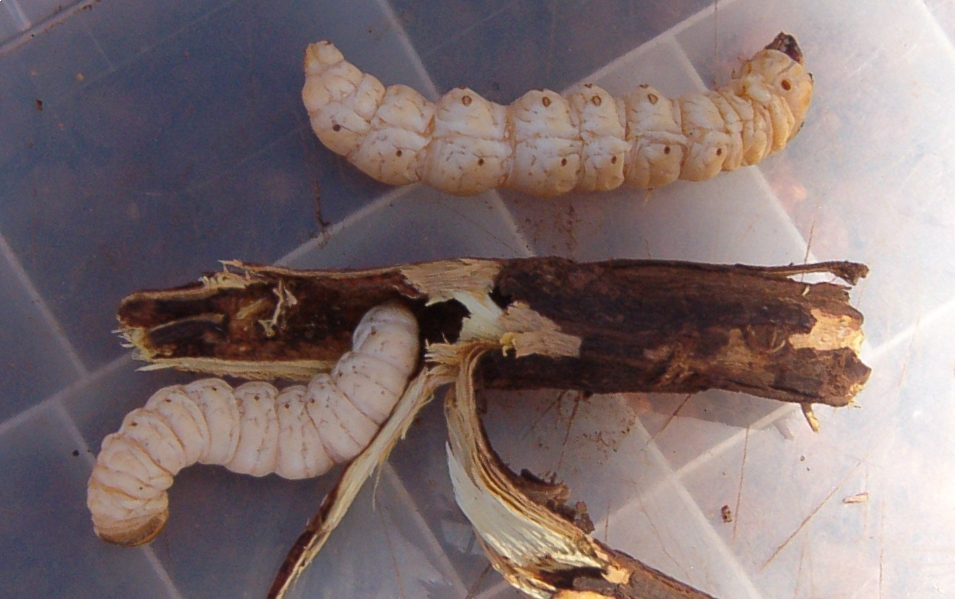
Witchetty grubs

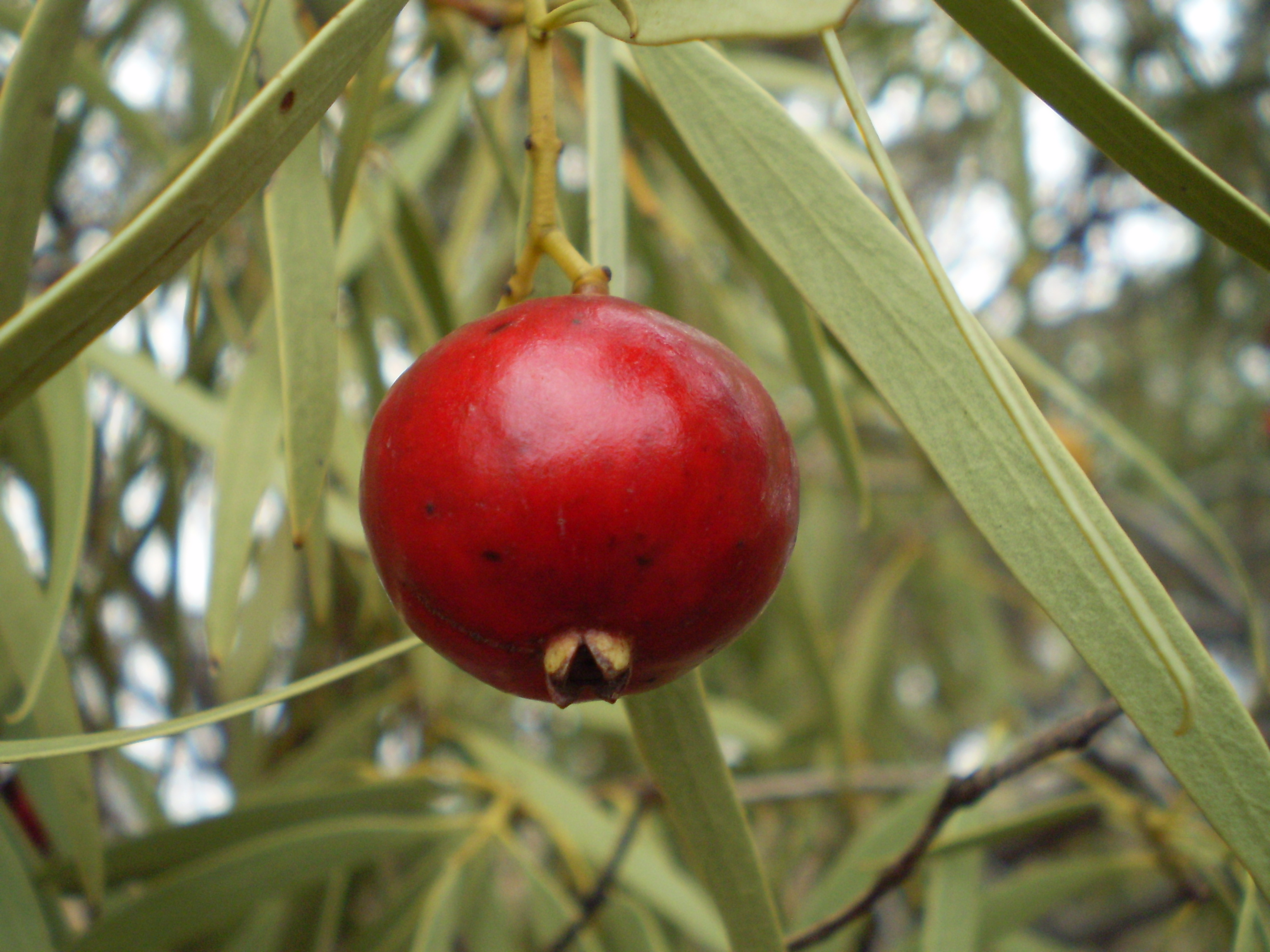
Desert quandong

=== Development of Australian cuisine ===
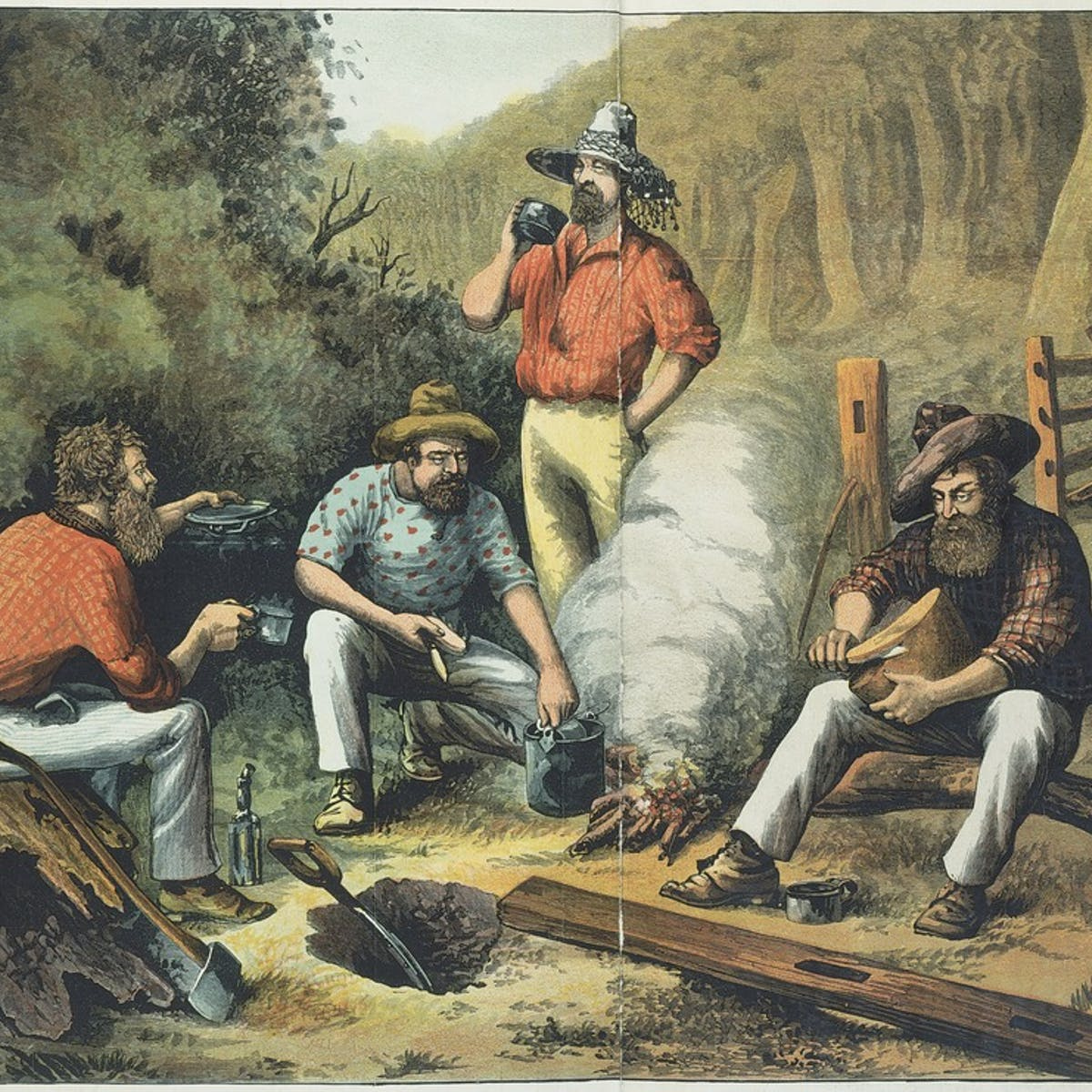
Tea and damper – Alfred Martin Ebsworth (1883)

Following the pre-colonial period, European settlers began arriving with the First Fleet at Sydney Harbour in 1788. The diet consisted of "bread, salted meat and tea with lashings of rum (initially from the West Indies but later made from the waste cane of the sugar industry in Queensland)." The British found familiar game in Australia, including swan, goose, pigeon, and fish, but the new settlers often had difficulty adjusting to the prospect of native fauna as a staple diet. Meat constituted a large proportion of the Australian diet during the colonial era and into the 20th century.

After initial difficulties, Australian agriculture became a major global producer and supplied fresh produce for the local market. Stock grazing (mostly sheep and cattle) is prevalent throughout the continent. Queensland and New South Wales became Australia's main beef cattle producers, while dairy cattle farming is found in the southern states, predominantly in Victoria. Wheat and other grain crops are spread fairly evenly throughout the mainland states. Sugar cane is also a major crop in Queensland and New South Wales. Fruit and vegetables are grown throughout Australia, and wheat is a main component of the Australian diet. Today there are over 85,681 farm businesses in Australia, 99 percent of which are locally owned and operated. Barbecued meat is almost synonymous with Australian cuisine, though it is estimated that more than 10% of Australians are now vegetarian.

=== Modern Australian cuisine ===
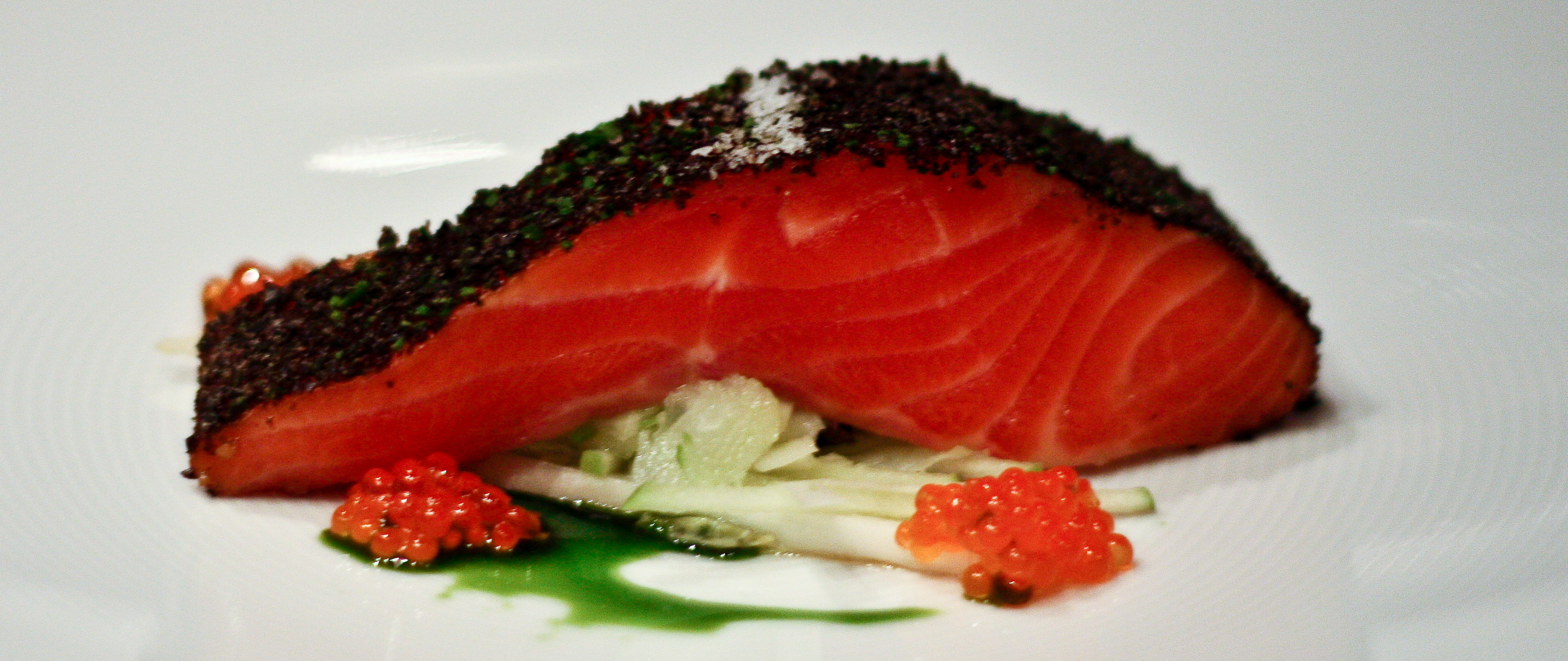
An iconic Modern Australian dish: confit of Tasmanian ocean trout at Tetsuya's, Sydney

After World War II, subsequent waves of multicultural immigration, with a majority drawn from Asia and the Mediterranean region, and the strong, sophisticated food cultures these ethnic communities have brought with them, influenced the development of Australian cuisine. This blending of "European techniques and Asian flavours" came to be known as Modern Australian cuisine.

Arguably the first Modern Australian restaurant was Sydney's Bayswater Brasserie (est. 1982), which offered Mediterranean dishes with Asian and Middle Eastern influences and "showed Sydney [...] that food can be adventurous without being expensive". The term itself was first used in print in the 1993 edition of the Sydney Morning Herald Good Food Guide, which placed 34 restaurants under this heading, and was quickly adopted to describe the burgeoning food scene in Sydney in the 1990s. Leading exponents of the style include Tetsuya Wakuda, Neil Perry and Peter Gilmore. As of 2014, the term is considered somewhat dated, with many restaurants preferring to call their style "contemporary Australian cuisine" instead. Celebrated Australian chef and restaurateur Tony Bilson, the Godfather of Australian cuisine, laid the groundwork for modern Australian cuisine, transitioning the dining scene from its conservative, rigid past into a sophisticated, world-class gastronomic era.

== Fruit and vegetables ==
=== Fruit ===
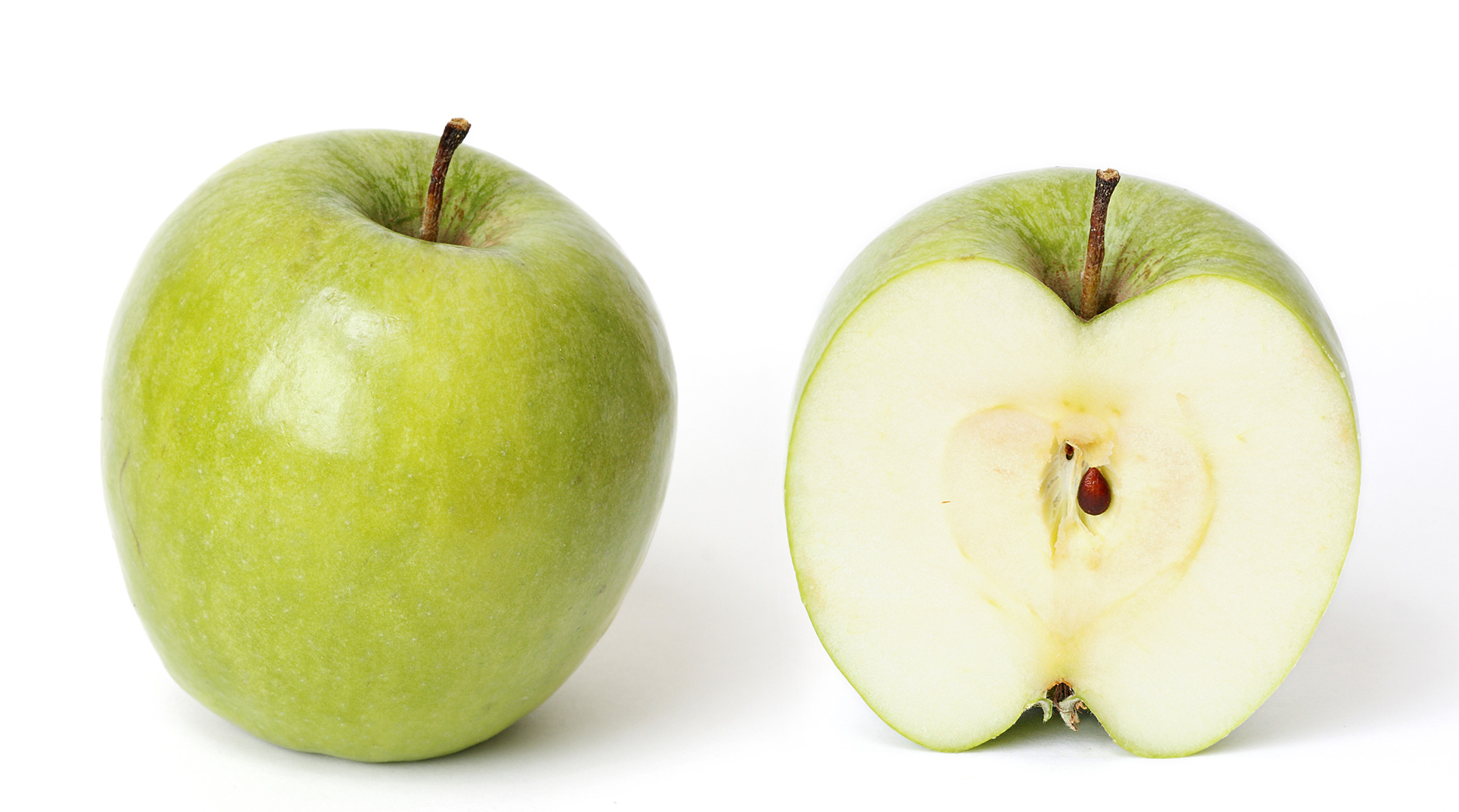
A Granny Smith apple

There are many species of Australian native fruits, such as quandong (native peach), wattleseed, muntries/munthari berry, Illawarra plums, riberry, native raspberries, and lilli pillies, as well as a range of native citrus species including the desert lime and finger lime. These usually fall under the category of bush tucker, which is used in some restaurants and in commercial preserves and pickles but not generally well known among Australians due to its low availability.

Australia also has large fruit-growing regions in most states for tropical fruits in the north, and stone fruits and temperate fruits in the south, which have a Mediterranean or temperate climate. The Granny Smith variety of apples originated in Sydney in 1868. Another well-known Western Australian apple variety is the Cripps Pink, known locally and internationally as "Pink Lady" apples, which was first cultivated in 1973.

Fruits cultivated and consumed in Australia include apples, banana, kiwifruit, oranges and other citrus, mangoes (seasonally), mandarin, stonefruit, avocado, watermelons, rockmelons, lychees, pears, nectarines, plums, apricots, grapes, melons, papaya (also called pawpaw), pineapple, passionfruit and berries (strawberries, raspberries, etc.).

=== Vegetables ===
In the temperate regions of Australia, vegetables are traditionally eaten seasonally, especially in regional areas, although in urban areas, there is large-scale importation of fresh produce sourced from around the world by supermarkets and wholesalers for grocery stores, to meet demands for year-round availability. Spring vegetables include artichoke, asparagus, bean shoots, beetroot, broccoli, cabbage, cauliflower, cucumber, leek, lettuce, mushrooms, peas, rhubarb, and spinach; summer vegetables include capsicum, cucumber, eggplant, squash, tomato, and zucchini.

== Meat and poultry ==
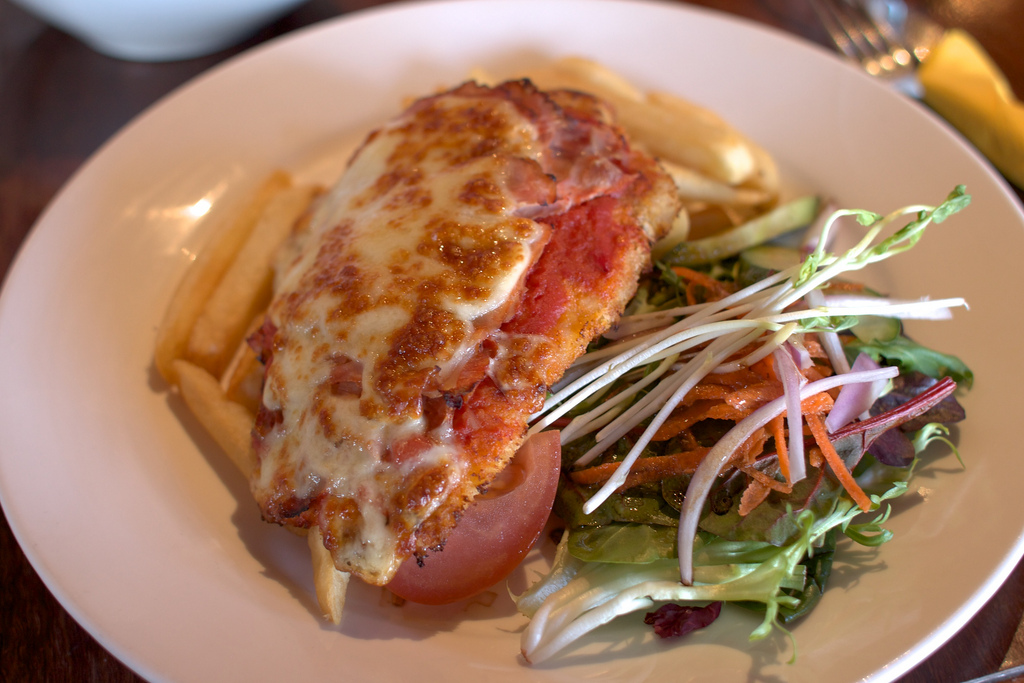
Chicken parmigiana, colloquially known as a chicken "parmi" or "parma", is a popular pub food

Chicken is the most commonly consumed of all meats or poultry by weight, with approximately 47 kilograms of chicken consumed by the average Australian per year.

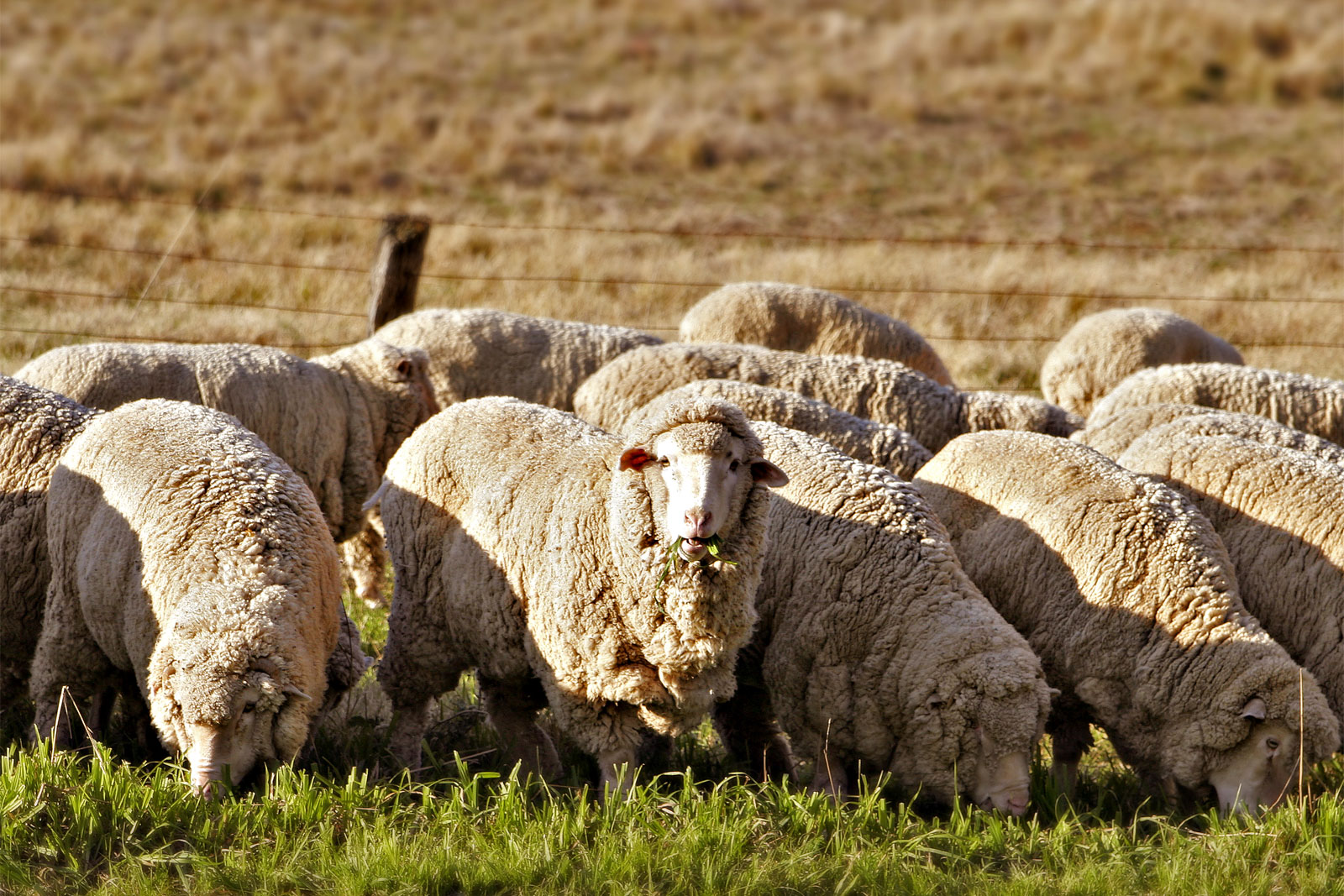
Sheep grazing in rural Australia. Early British settlers introduced Western stock and crops

As of July 2018 Australians ate around 25 kilograms of beef per person, with beef having a 35% share of fresh meat sales by value, the highest of any fresh meat in 2018–19. Lamb is very popular in Australia, with roasting cuts (legs and shoulders), chops, and shanks being the most common cuts. Lamb will often form part of either a Sunday roast or a barbecue. It is also commonly found as an ingredient in gyros ("yiros") and doner kebabs, brought by Greek and Turkish immigrants in the 1960s and 1970s. Australia consumes more lamb and mutton than any other country listed by the OECD-FAO (with Kazakhstan in second place). In 2017, Australians consumed an average of 8.5 kilograms (19 lb) per person. By way of comparison, New Zealanders average 3.2 kilograms (7.1 lb) and Americans just 0.4 kilograms (0.88 lb).

Lunch at an Australian pub is called a counter lunch, while the term counter meal is used for either lunch or dinner. Common dishes served at counter lunches and counter meals are steak and chips, chicken parmigiana and chips, a mixed grill (an assortment of grilled meats), and roast lamb or beef with roast vegetables. Lunch meats are known as smallgoods in Australia and New Zealand, referring to products such as ham, bacon, sausages or salami.

=== Game ===
Kangaroo meat is available as game in Australia, although it is not among the most commonly eaten meats. In colonial-era recipes, kangaroo was treated much like ox tail, and braised until tender, forming a rich gravy. It is available today in various cuts and sausages. Kangaroo is, however, a common commercial dog food in Australia. Other less commonly eaten forms of game are emu and crocodile.

Game meats of Australia
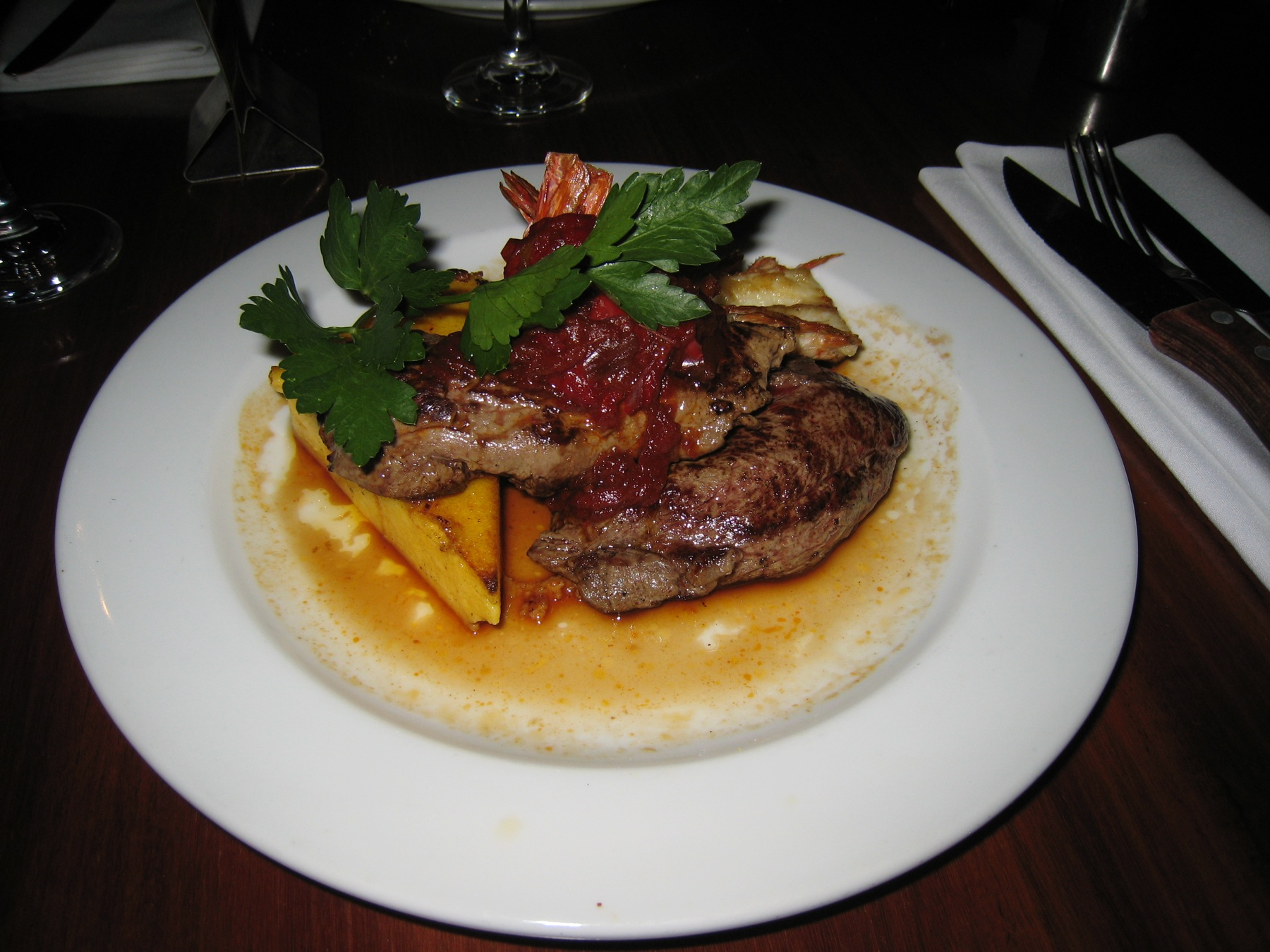
Kangaroo steak

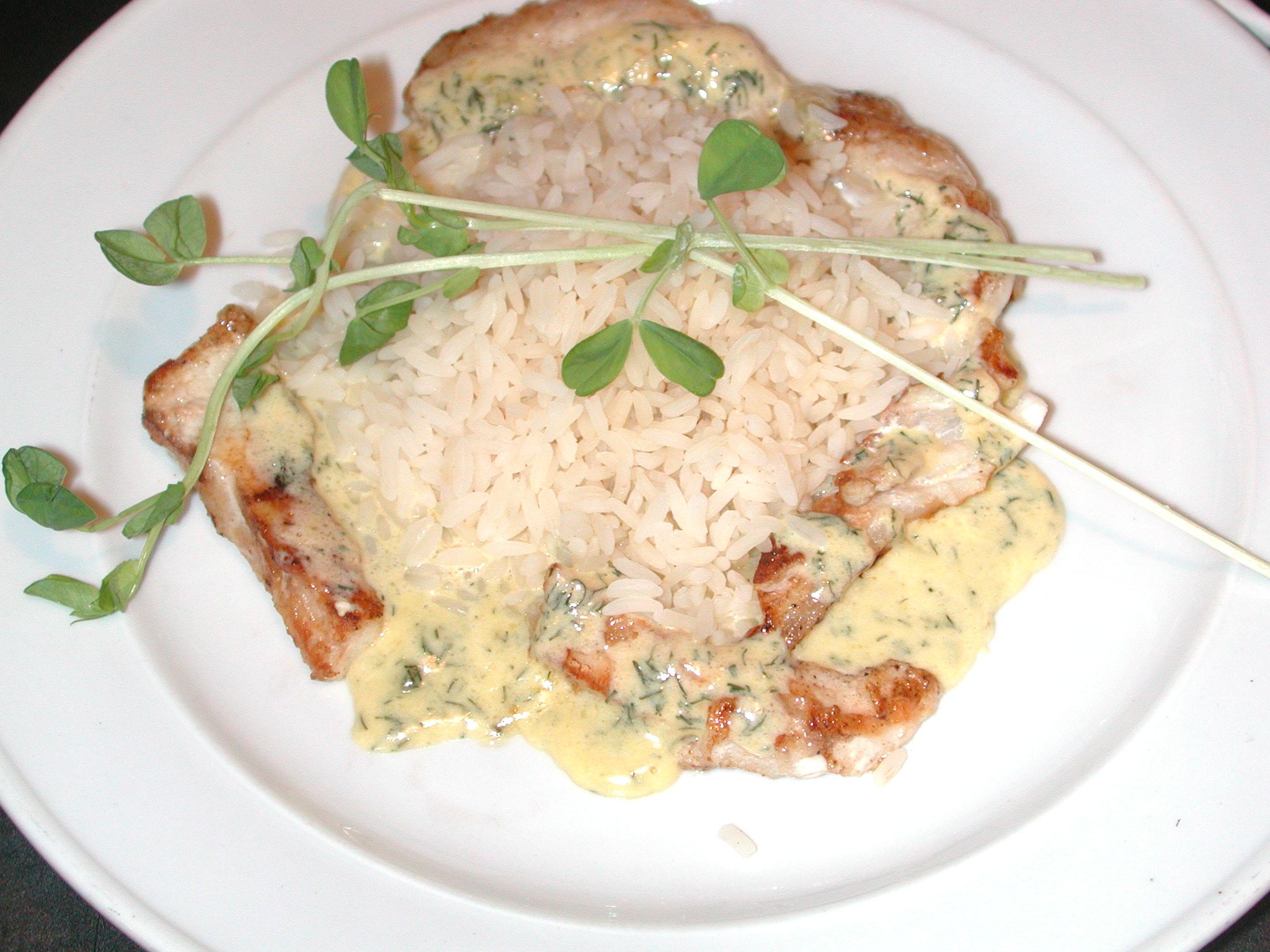
A crocodile dish

== Fish and seafood ==
Seafood consumption is increasing, but it is less common in the Australian diet than poultry and beef. Australian cuisine features Australian seafood such as southern bluefin tuna, King George whiting, Moreton Bay bugs, mud crab, jewfish, dhufish (Western Australia) and yabby. Australia is one of the largest producers of abalone and rock lobster.

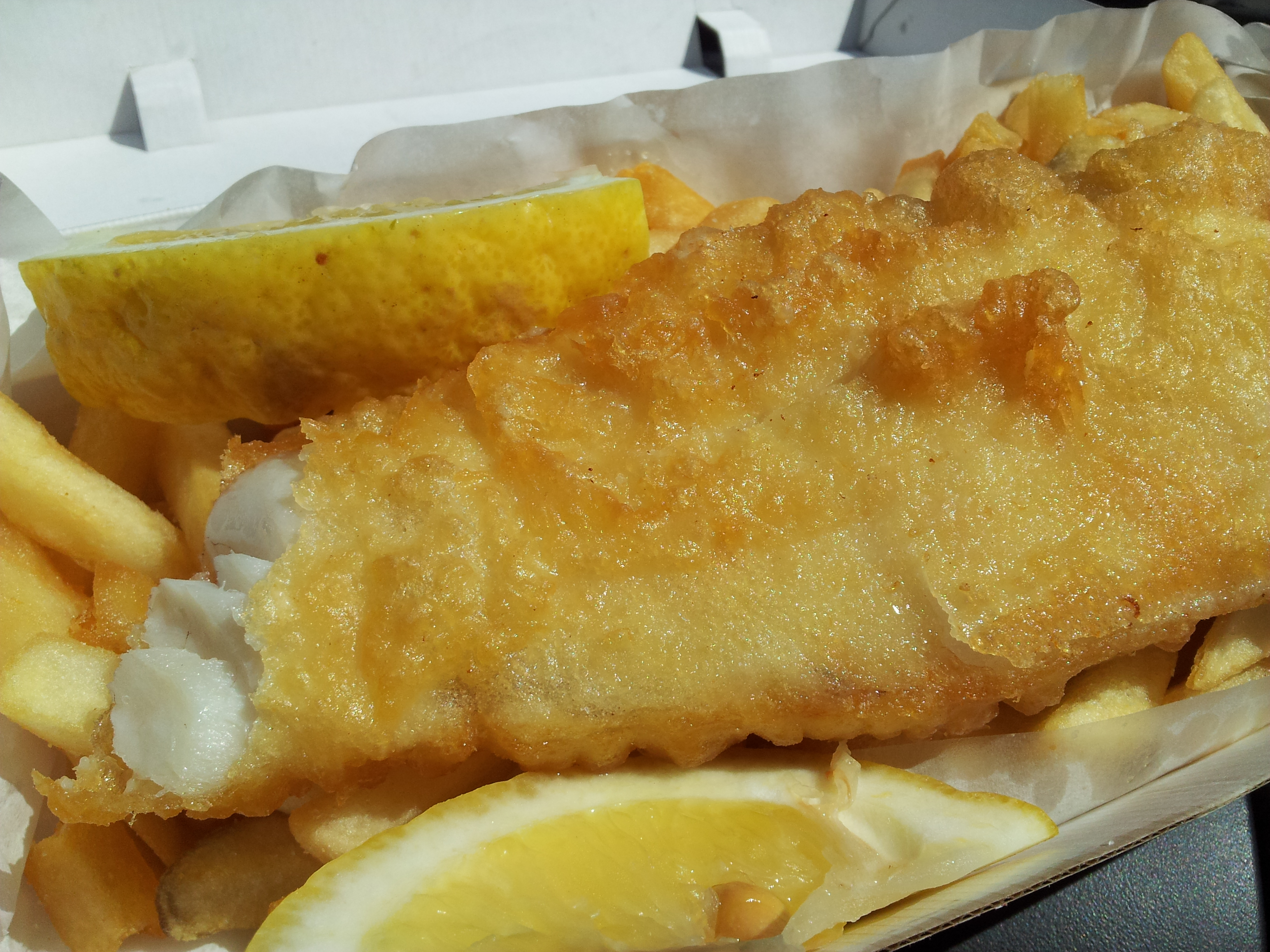
Typical serving of fish and chips

Fish and chips is a take-away food that originated in the United Kingdom and remains popular in Australia. It generally consists of battered deep-fried fish with deep-fried chipped (slab-cut) potatoes. Rather than cod which is more common in the UK, the most popular fish at Australian fish and chips shops, at least in southern Australian states, is flake, a fillet of gummy shark (Mustelus antarcticus).

Flathead is also a popular sport and table fish found in all parts of Australia. Barramundi is a fish found in northern Australian river systems. Bay lobsters, better known in Australia as Moreton Bay bugs, are common in seafood restaurants, or may be served with steak as surf and turf.

The most common species of the aquaculture industry are salmon, tuna, oysters, and prawns. Other food species include abalone, freshwater finfish (such as barramundi, Murray cod, silver perch), brackish water or marine finfish (such as barramundi, snapper, yellowtail kingfish, mulloway, groupers), mussels, mud crabs and sea cucumbers.

While inland river and lake systems are relatively sparse, they nevertheless provide freshwater game fish and crustaceans suitable for dining. Fishing and aquaculture constitute Australia's fifth most valuable agricultural industry after wool, beef, wheat, and dairy. Approximately 600 varieties of marine and freshwater seafood species are caught and sold in Australia for both local and overseas consumption. European carp, common in the Murray River as an invasive species, is not considered edible by most Australians despite being common in cuisines across Europe.

Fish and other seafood dishes in Australia
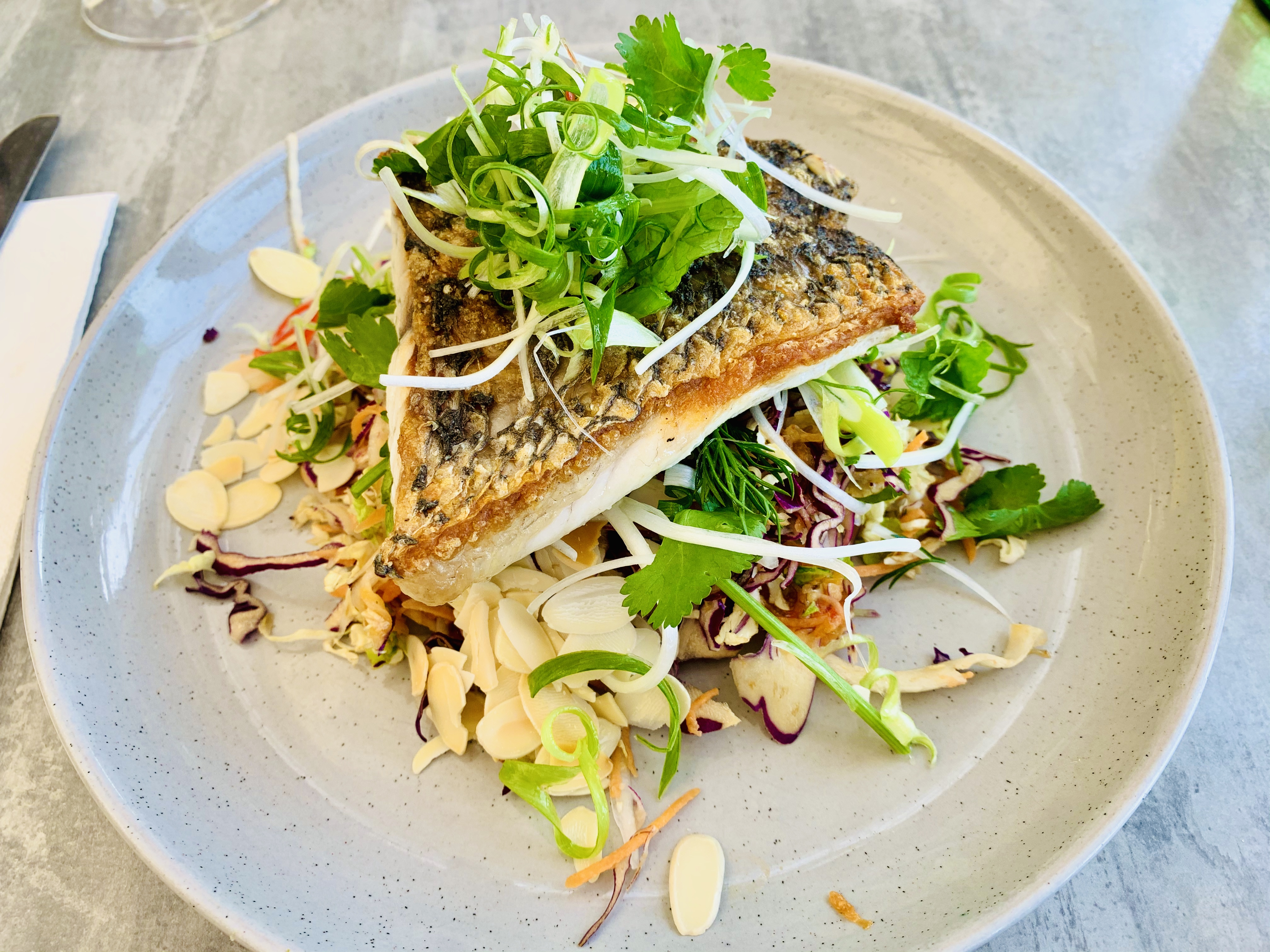
Barramundi

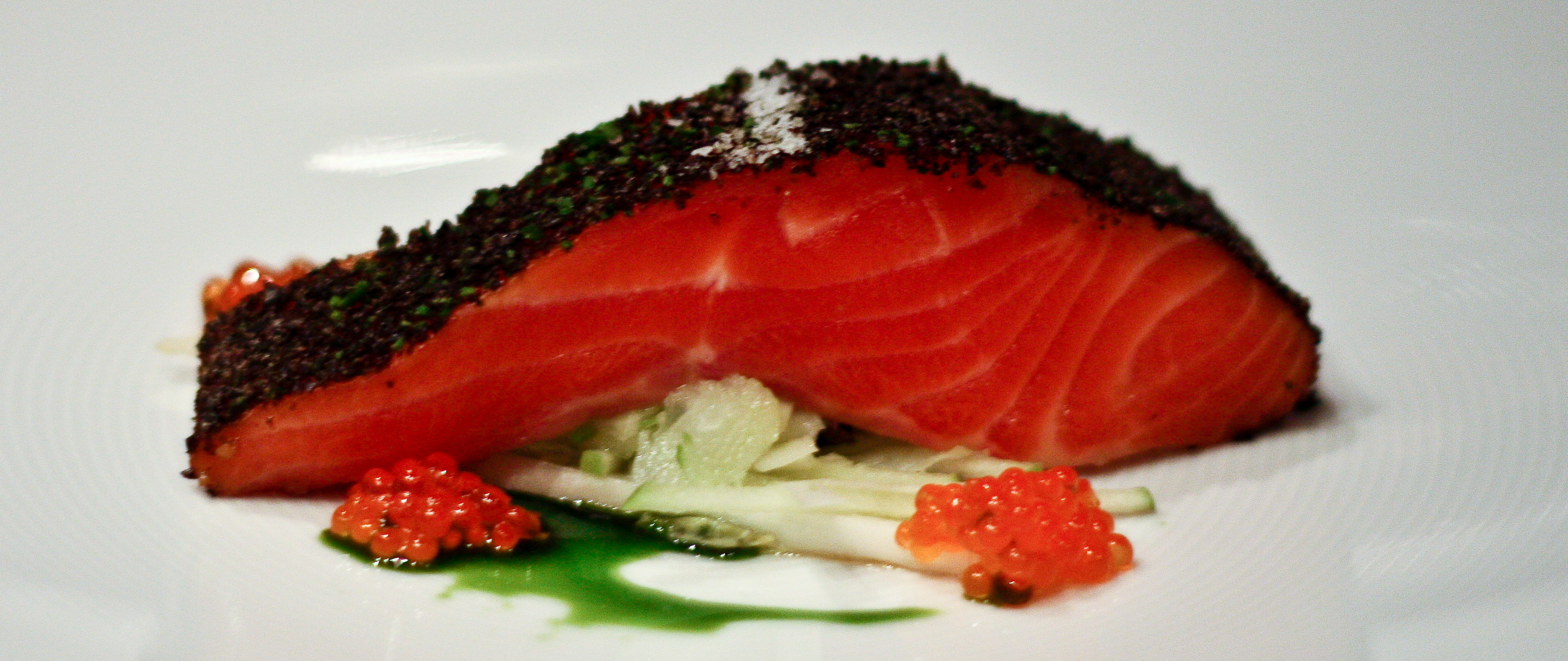
Confit of Tasmanian ocean trout

== Dairy ==
The dairy industry in Australia reaches as far back as the first British settlement of 1788. Today, the Australian dairy industry produces a wide variety of milk, cream, butter, cheese, and yoghurt products.

Australians are high consumers of dairy products, consuming on average some 102.4 litres (22.5 imp gal; 27.1 US gal) of milk per person a year, 12.9 kilograms (28 lb) of cheese, 3.8 kilograms (8.4 lb) of butter and 7.1 kilograms (16 lb) of yoghurt products.

== Beverages ==
=== Tea ===
For most of Australia's history, following the arrival of British settlers, black tea was the most commonly consumed hot beverage; however, in the 1980s, coffee overtook tea in popularity. In the 19th century, billy tea was a staple drink for those out in the Australian bush, such as those working on the land or travelling overland. Boiling water for tea in a billy over a campfire and adding a gum leaf for flavouring remains an iconic traditional Australian method for preparing tea. Famously, it was prepared by the ill-fated swagman in the Australian folksong "Waltzing Matilda". Tea and biscuits or freshly home-baked scones are common for afternoon tea between friends and family.

=== Coffee ===
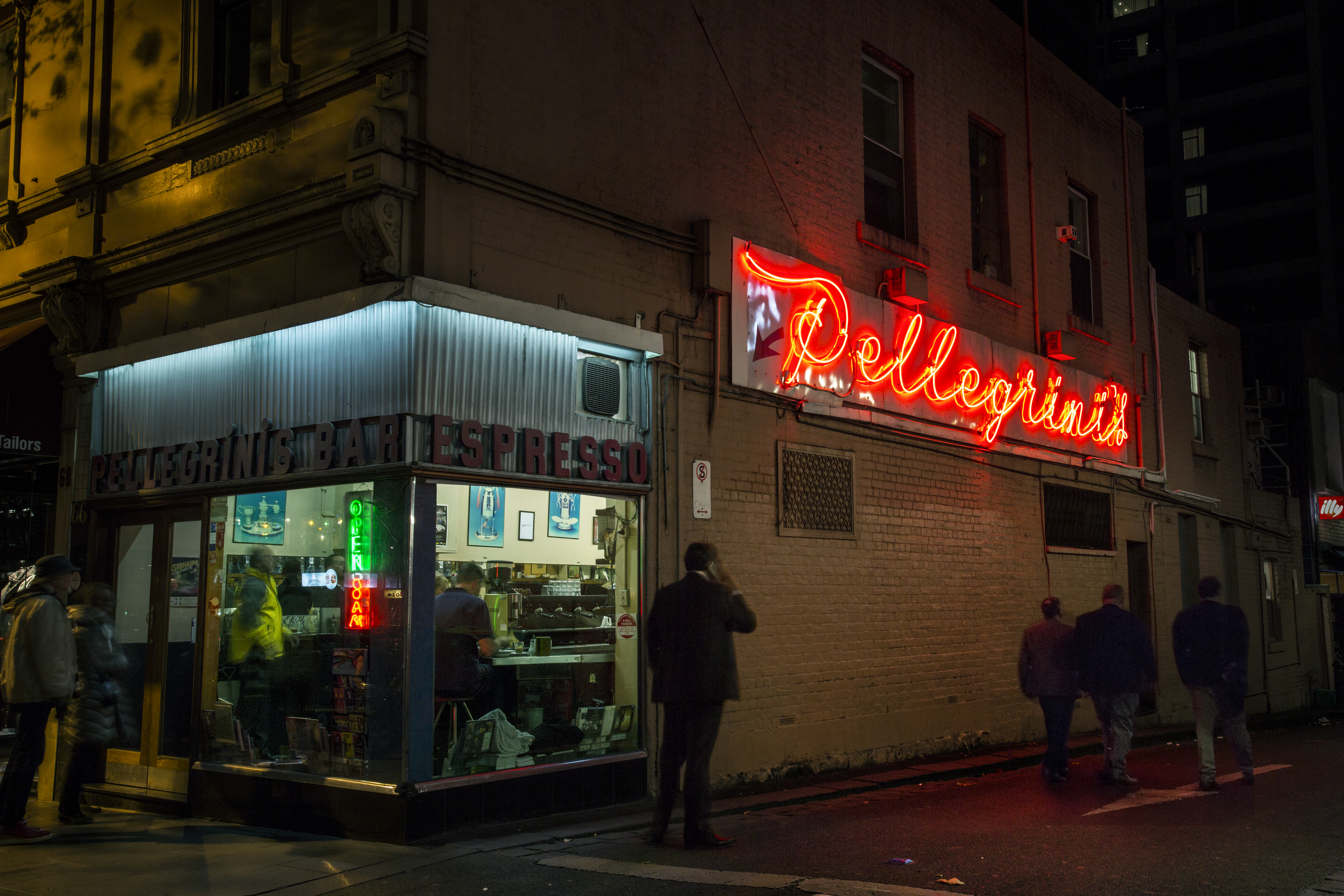
Pellegrini's Espresso Bar in central Melbourne opened in 1954

Today's Australia has a distinct coffee culture. The coffee industry has grown from independent cafes since the early 20th century. The flat white became popular in Australia some time after 1985, and its invention is claimed by a Sydneysider (although this claim is disputed by a New Zealand-based barista). The iconic Greek cafés of Sydney and Melbourne were the first to introduce locally roasted coffees in 1910. US military personnel stationed in Australia during the Second World War helped to spread the habit of coffee drinking, initially in the form of instant coffee.

In 1952, the first espresso machines began to appear in Australia, and a plethora of fine Italian coffee houses were emerging in Melbourne and Sydney. Pellegrini's Espresso Bar and Legend Café often lay claim to being Melbourne's first 'real' espresso bars, opening their doors in 1954 and 1956, respectively. This decade also saw the establishment of one of Australia's most iconic coffee brands, Vittoria, which remains the country's largest coffee maker and distributor. The brand has existed in Australia since 1958, well before it moved to the US.

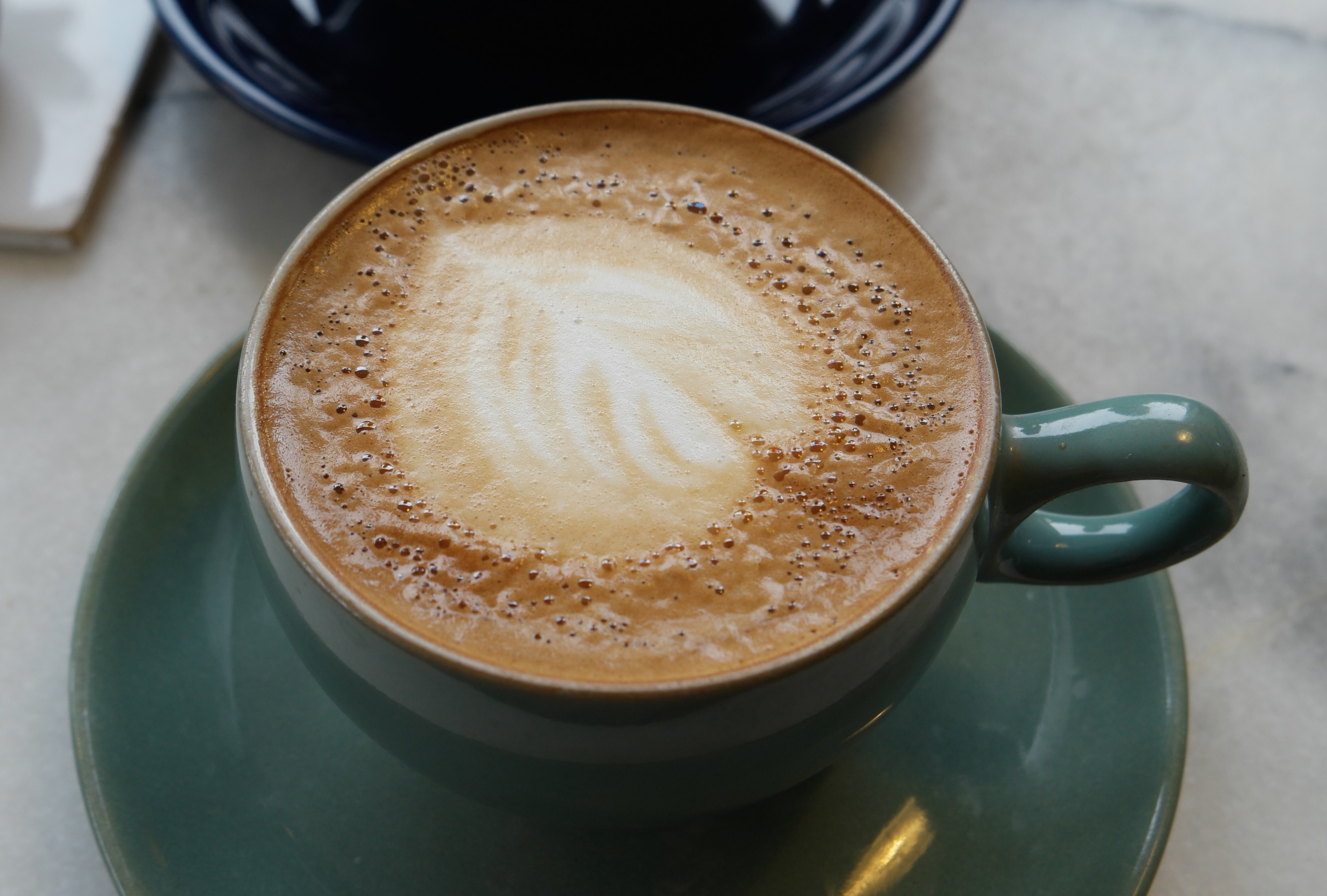
The ubiquitous Australian coffee drink, the flat white

To this day, international coffee chains such as Starbucks have very little market share in Australia, with Australia's long established independent cafés existing along with homegrown franchises such as The Coffee Club, Michel's Patisserie, Dôme in WA, and Zarraffas Coffee in Queensland. One reason for this is that, unlike the United States and Asia, Australia, for many decades, had already had an established culture of independent cafés before coffee chains tried to enter the market.

=== Other hot beverages ===
The chocolate and malt powder Milo, which was developed by Thomas Mayne in Sydney in 1934 in response to the Great Depression, is mixed with cold or hot milk to produce a popular beverage. In recent years, Milo has been exported and is also commonly consumed in Southeast Asia even becoming a major ingredient in some desserts produced in the region.

Hot beverages in Australia
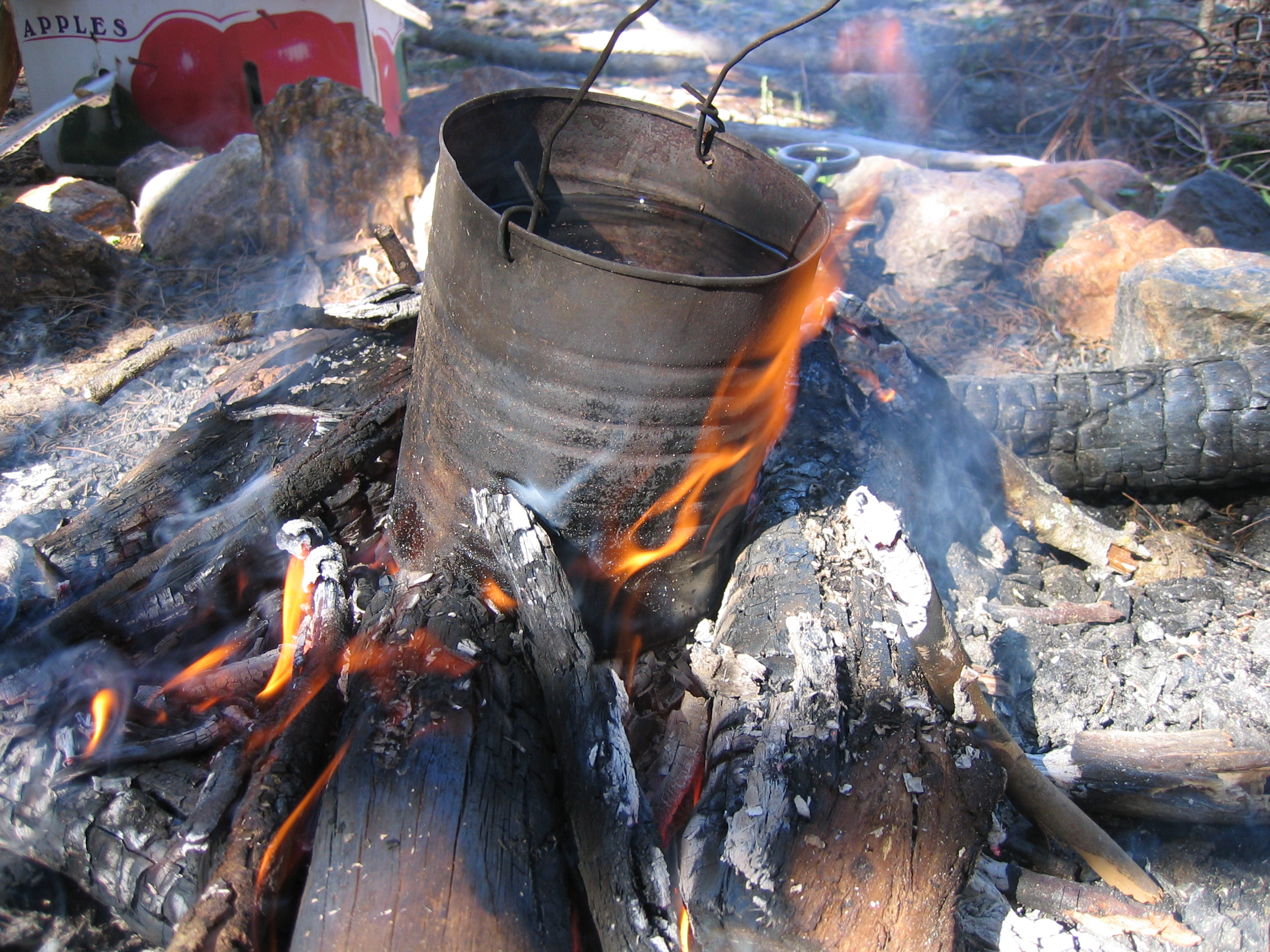
A traditional billycan on a campfire, used to heat water, typically for brewing tea

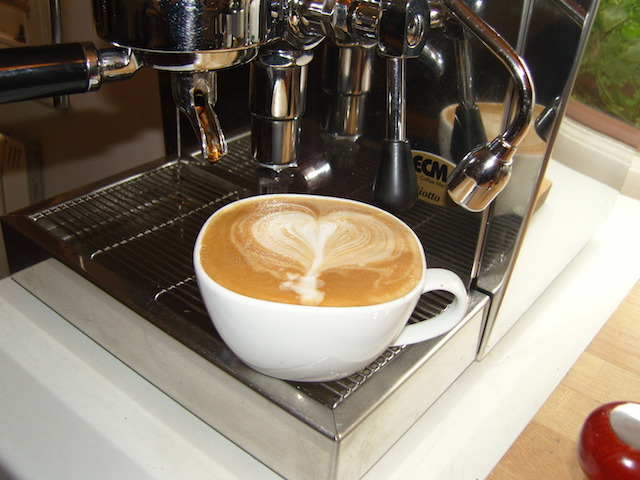
A flat white featuring latte art

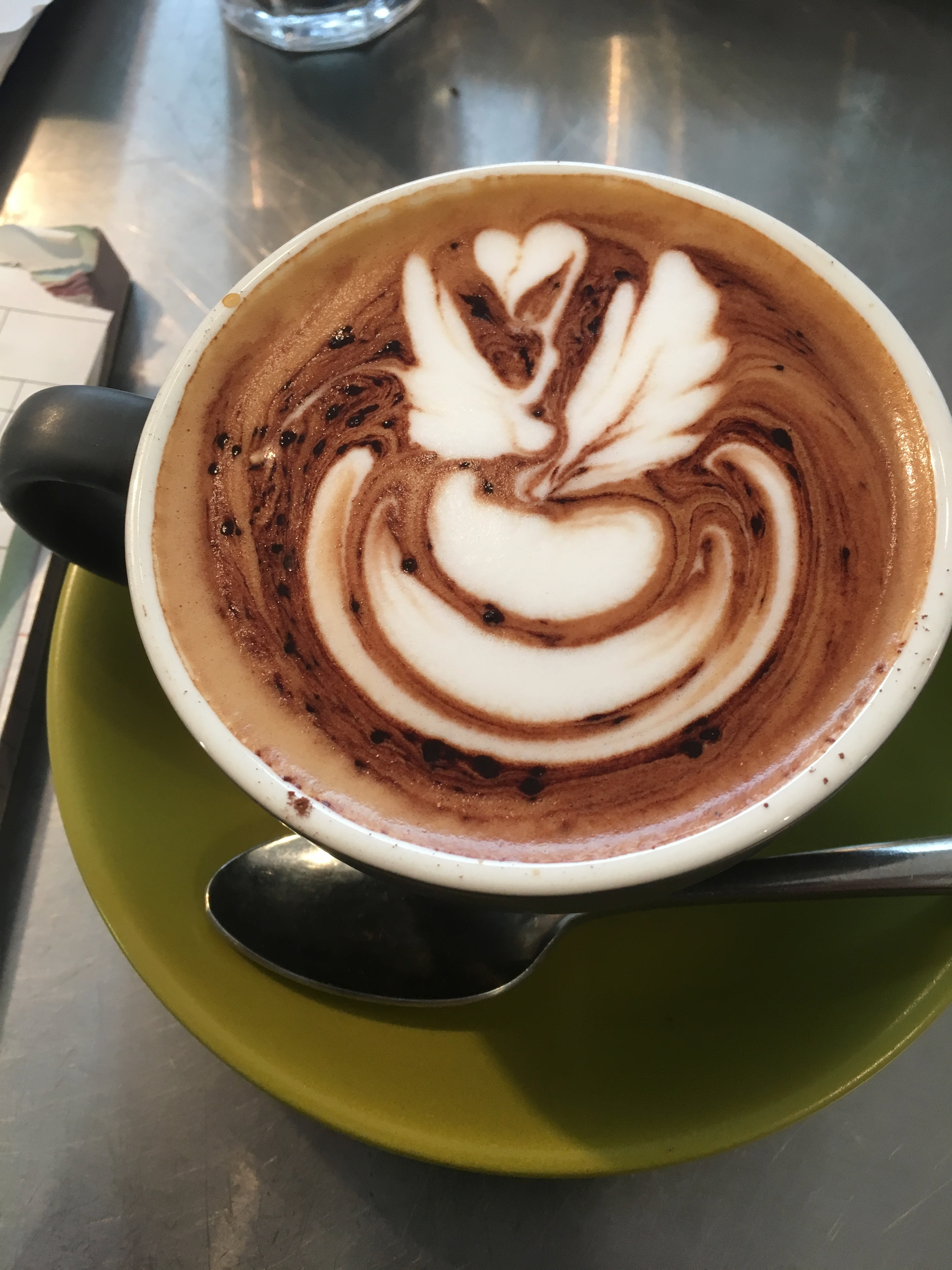
A caffè latte featuring latte art

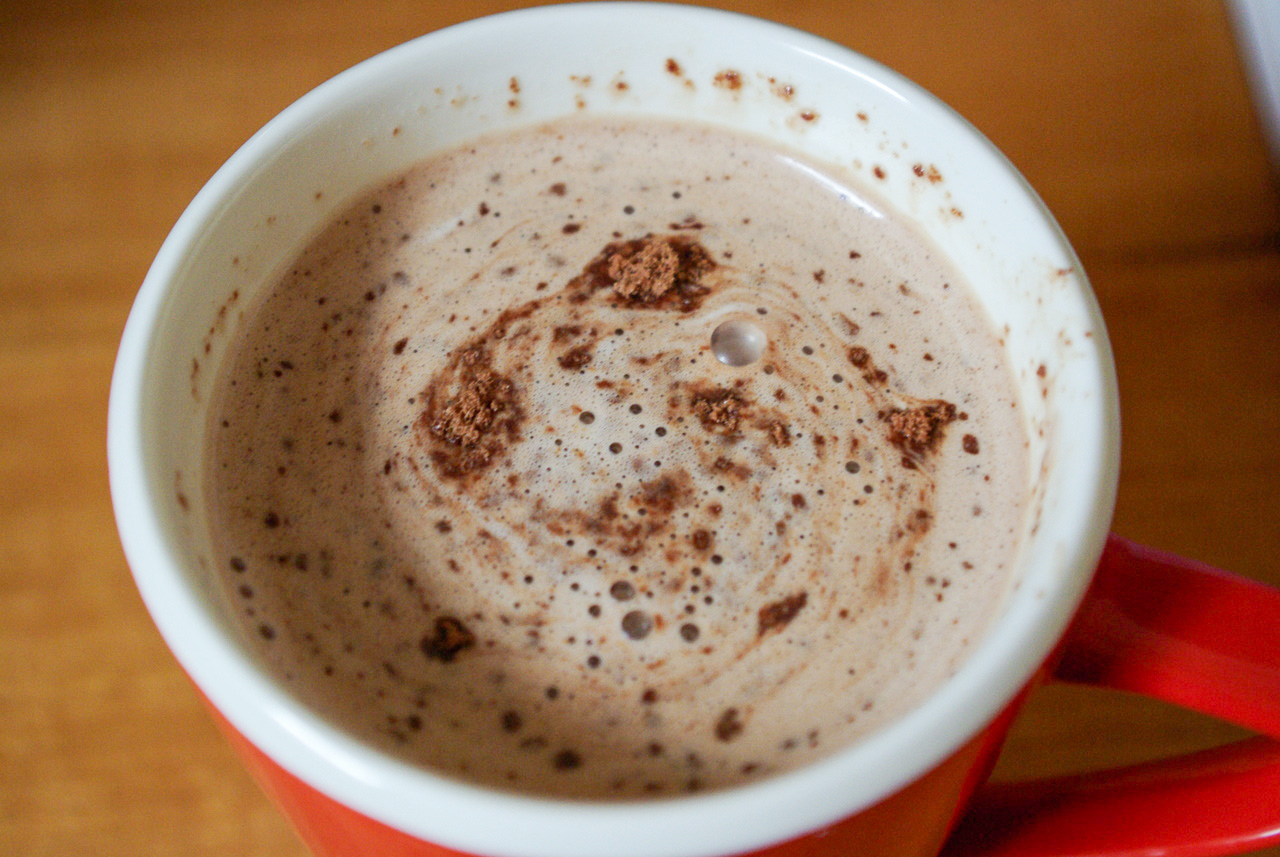
A cup of hot Milo

=== Alcohol ===
==== Beer ====
Beer in Australia has been popular since colonial times. James Squire is considered to have founded Australia's first commercial brewery in 1798, and the Cascade Brewery in Hobart, Tasmania, has been operating since the early 19th century. Since the 1970s, Australian beers have become increasingly popular globally – with Foster's Lager being an iconic export brand. However, Fosters is not a large seller on the local market, with alternatives such as Victoria Bitter and Carlton Draught outselling the popular export. Craft beer is popular, as well as distinctive products from smaller breweries such as Coopers and Little Creatures.

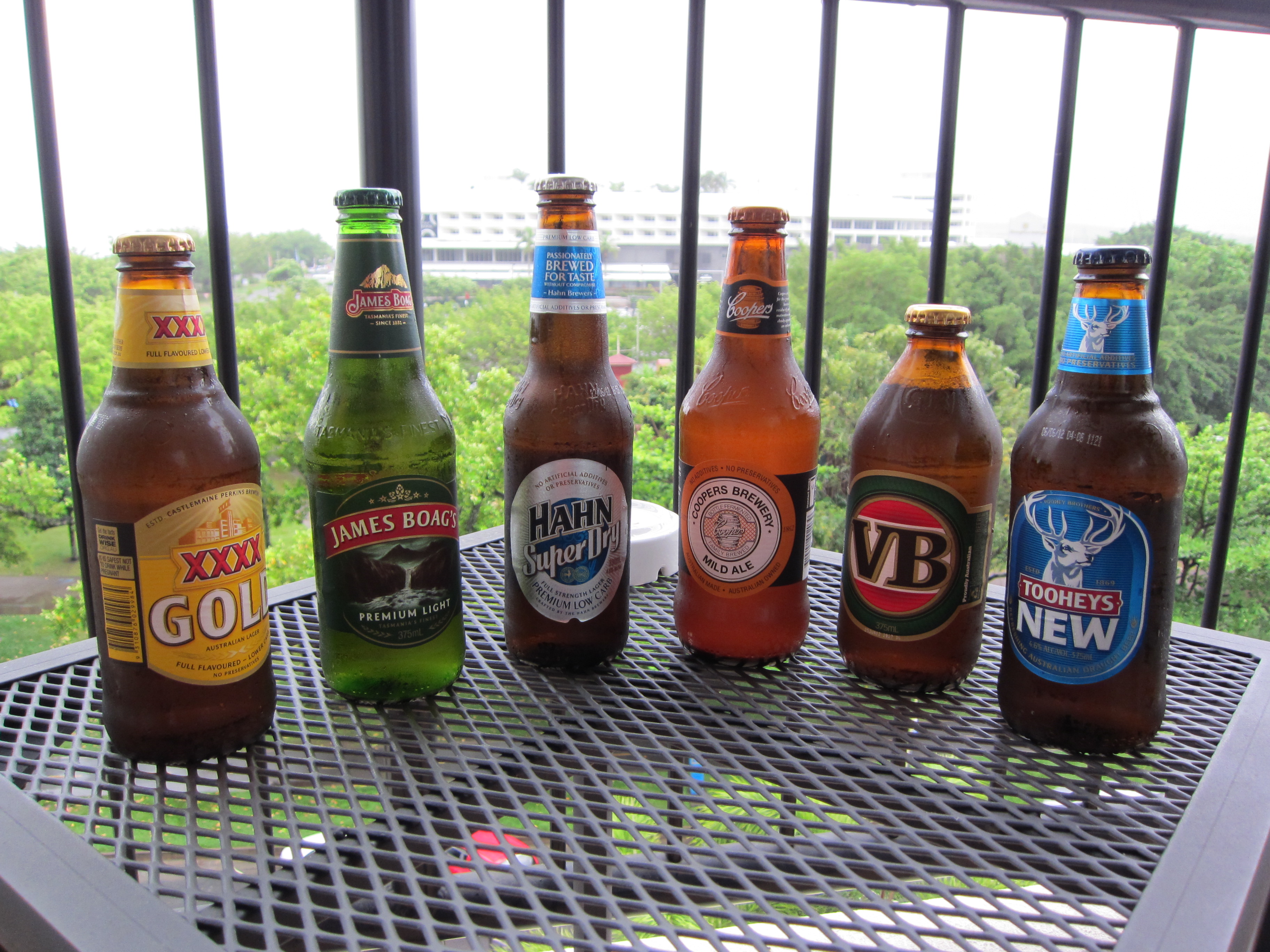
Six stubbies of different Australian beers.

==== Wine ====
The Australian wine industry is the fifth largest exporter of wine around the world, with 760 million litres a year to a large international export market, and contributes $5.5 billion per annum to the nation's economy. Australians consume over 530 million litres annually, with a per capita consumption of about 30 litres – 50% white table wine, 35% red table wine. Wine is produced in every state, with more than 60 designated wine regions totalling approximately 160,000 hectares. Australia's wine regions are mainly in the southern, cooler parts of the country, in New South Wales, South Australia, Victoria and Western Australia. Amongst the most famous wine districts are the Barossa Valley, Hunter Valley, Margaret River and Yarra Valley, and among the best known wine producers are Lindeman's, Penfolds, Rosemount Estate, Wynns Coonawarra Estate. In Australia's tropical regions, wine is produced from exotic fruits such as mango, passion fruit and lychees.

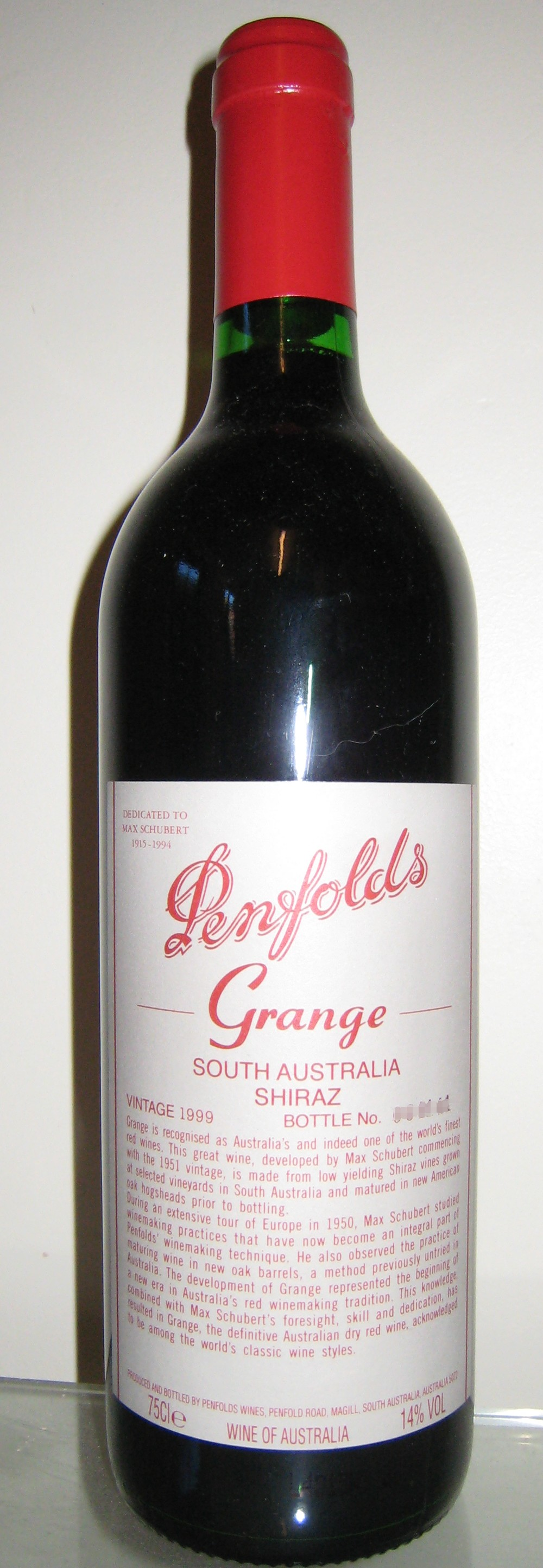
Penfolds Grange, 1999, a premium Australian red wine

==== Spirits ====
In modern times, South Australia has also become known for its growing number of premium spirits producers, with the South Australian Spirits industry quickly emerging as a world leader, with producers being recognised globally, such as Seppeltsfield Road Distillers, Never Never Distilling, Adelaide Hills Distilling, and many more. Rum served as a currency during the late 18th and early 19th centuries in Australia when metallic currency was in short supply.

=== Non-Alcoholic ===
Lemon, lime and bitters is a popular Non-Alcoholic drink consumed in Australia and New Zealand. It is believed to have been invented in Australia during the 1880’s

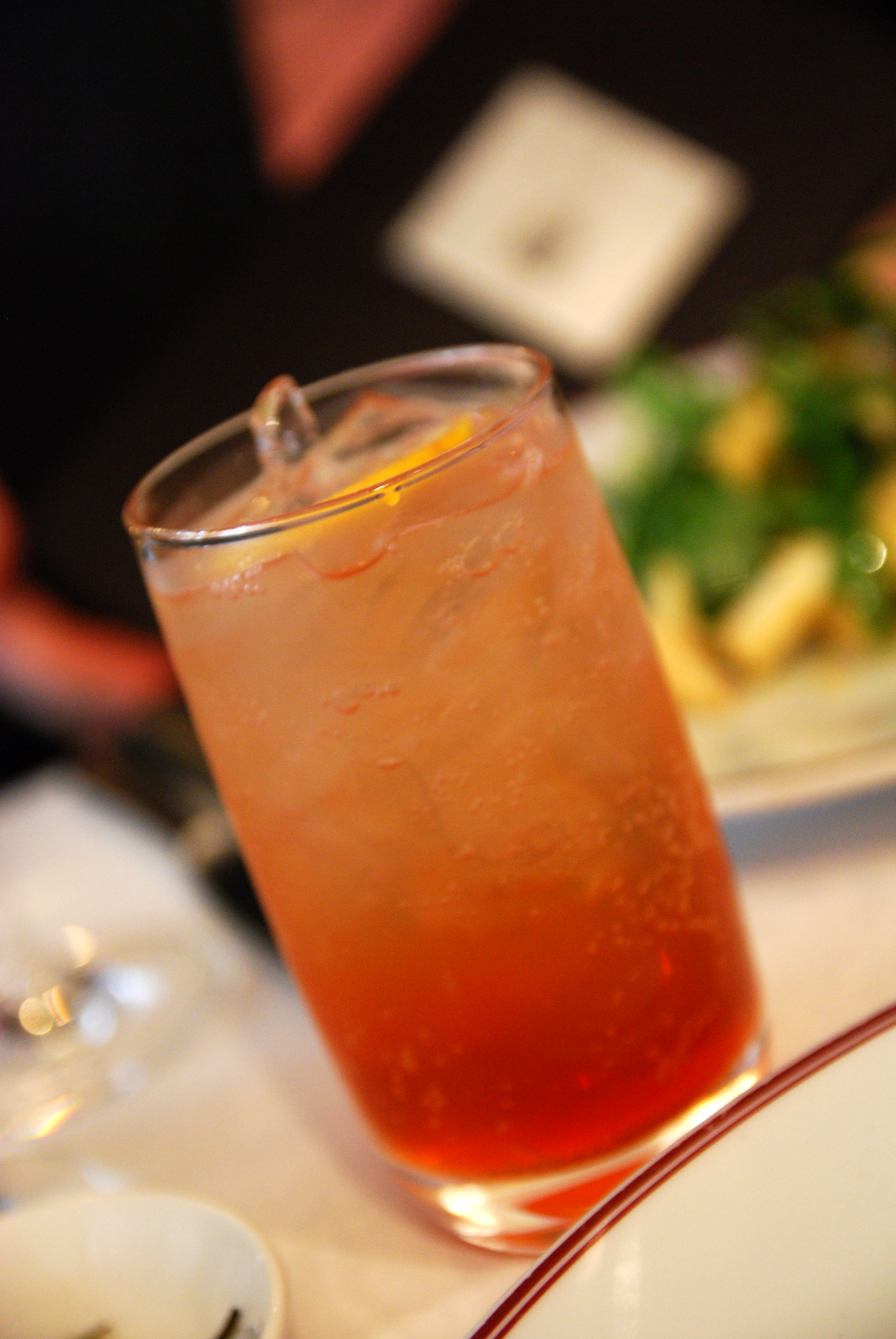
A glass of lemon, lime and bitters, which is believed to have been invented in Australia in the 1880s.

== Take-away and convenience foods ==
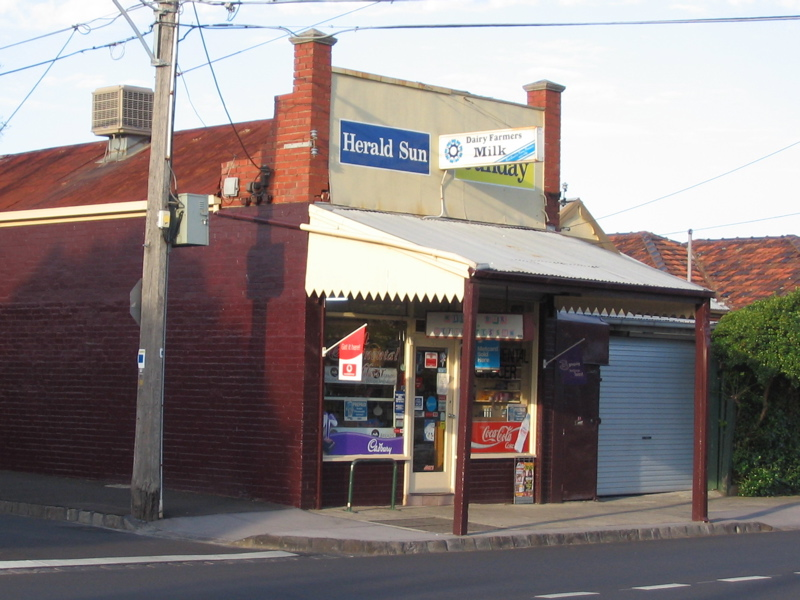
A traditional milk bar in the Melbourne suburb of North Fitzroy

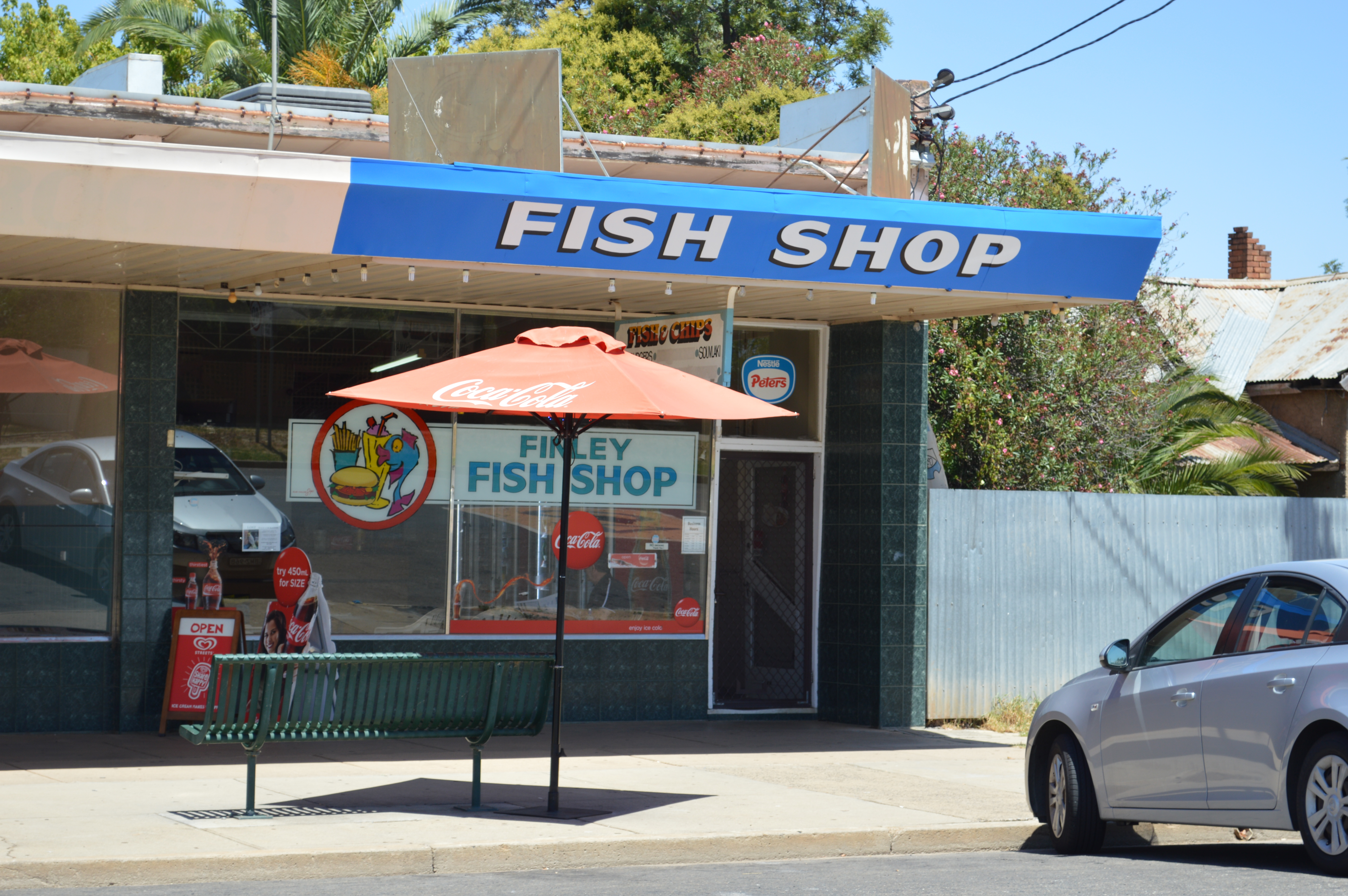
A fish and chip shop, Finley, New South Wales

The traditional places to buy take-away food in Australia have long been at a local milk bar, fish and chip shop, or bakery, though these have met with stiff competition from fast food chains and convenience stores in recent decades.

Iconic Australian take-away food (i.e. fast food) includes meat pies, sausage rolls, pasties, Chiko Rolls, and dim sims. Meat pies, sausage rolls, and pasties are often found at milk bars, bakeries, and petrol stations, often kept hot in a pie warmer or needing to be microwaved; meat pies are also a staple at Australian Rules football matches. Chiko Rolls, dim sims, and other foods that need to be deep-fried are to be found at fish and chip shops, as these have the necessary deep fryers in which to cook them. Bread rolls, with a variety of fillings, are a common alternative to sandwiches.

Australian hamburgers and steak sandwiches are mainly to be found at fish and chip shops. Australian hamburgers consist of a grilled beef patty, served with shredded lettuce and sliced tomato in a (usually toasted) round bread roll or bun, along with tomato sauce (less commonly, barbecue sauce). Common options to add include bacon, cheese, fried onions, fried egg, a slice of beetroot, and a slice of pineapple. A slice of gherkin is rarely included; these are a feature of burgers from American chains, not Australian. Steak sandwiches come with the same options, but instead of a beef patty, they consist of a thin steak and are served in two slices of toast, not buns. Pizza has also become a popular takeaway food item in Australia.

Commonly found at community and fundraising events are sausage sizzle stalls – a stall with a barbecue hot plate on which sausages are cooked. At a sausage sizzle, the sausage is served in a slice of white bread, with or without tomato sauce, and with the option of adding fried onions, and eaten as a snack or as a light lunch. A sausage sizzle at a polling station on any Australian state or Federal election day has humorously become known as a Democracy sausage. Similar stalls are held in the car parks of most Bunnings hardware stores on weekends, by volunteers fund-raising for service clubs, charities, societies, or sporting groups. The company supplies the infrastructure and enforces standards, including prices.

Australian take-away foods
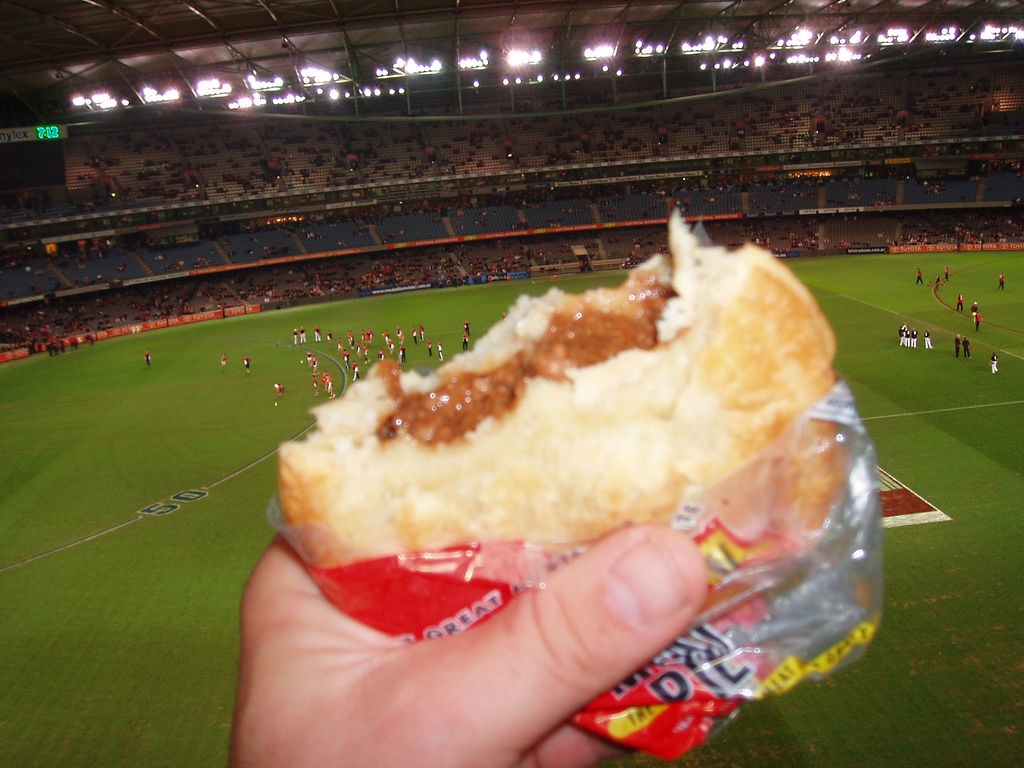
Meat pie at a football match

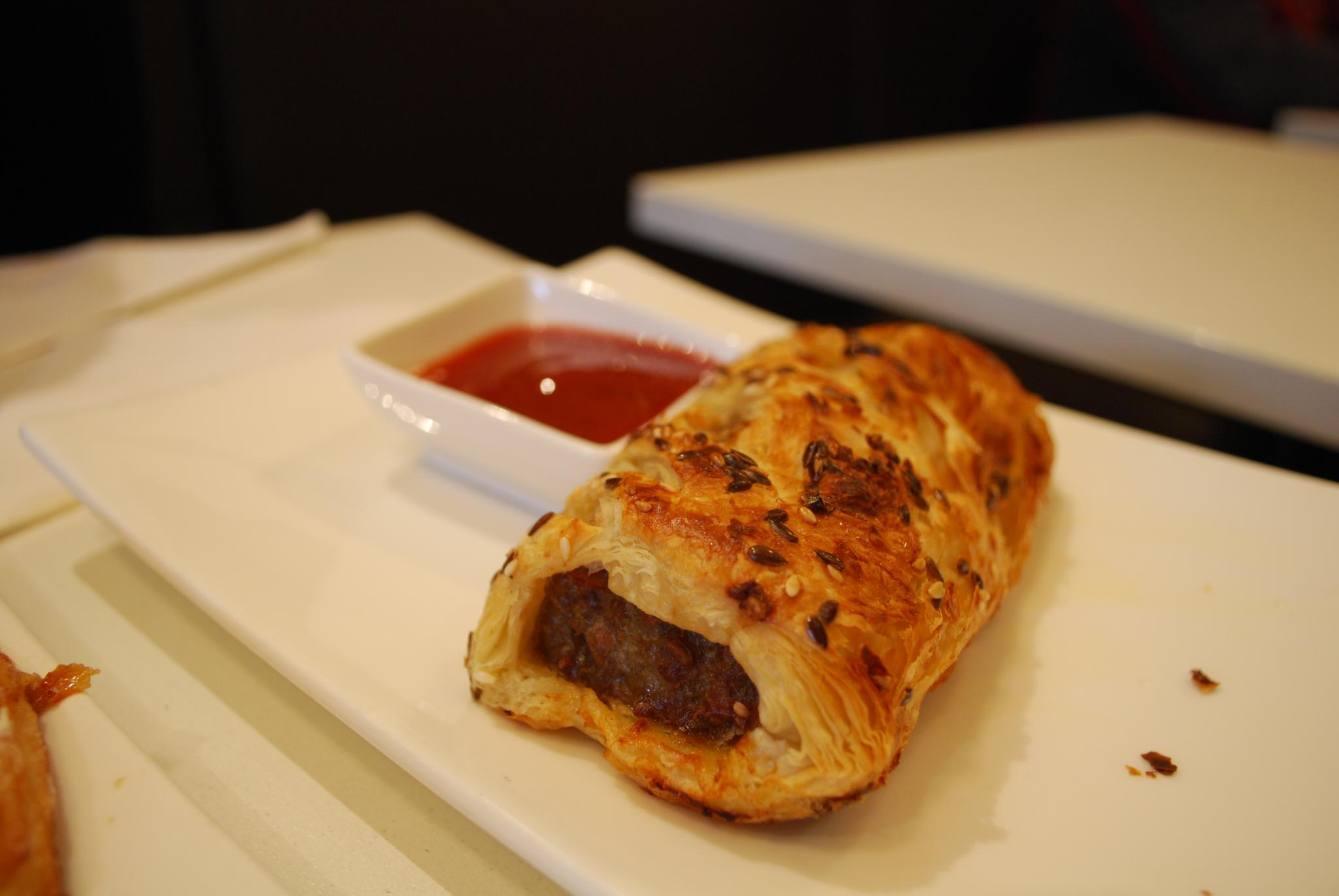
A sausage roll served in-house at a bakery

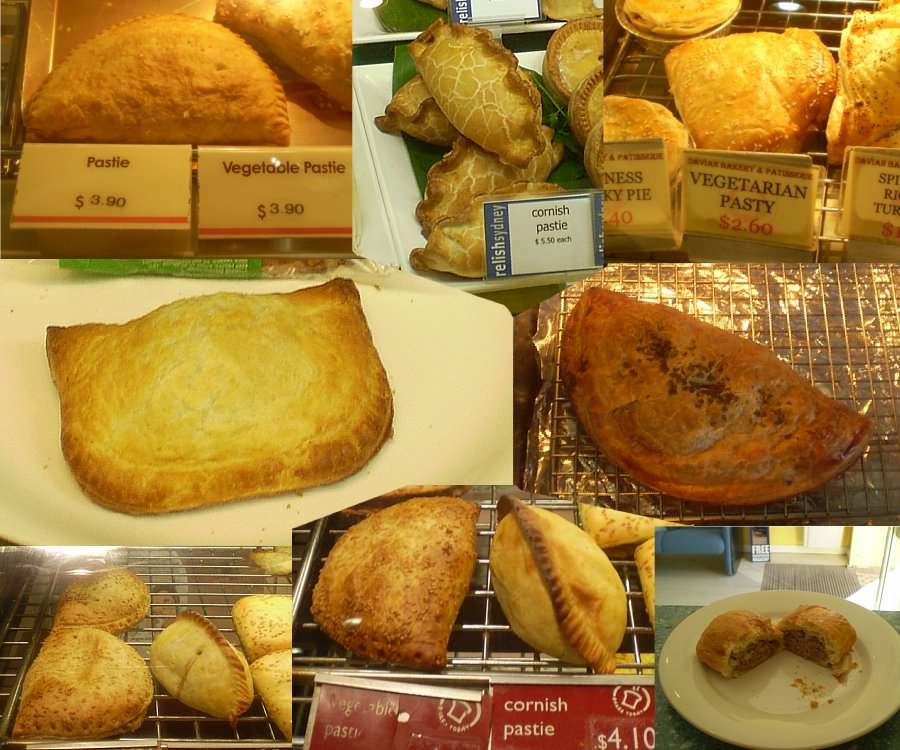
An assortment of pasties

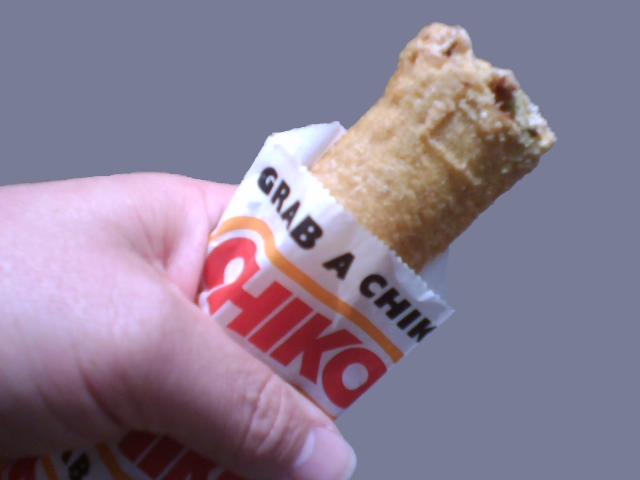
Chiko Roll in a bag

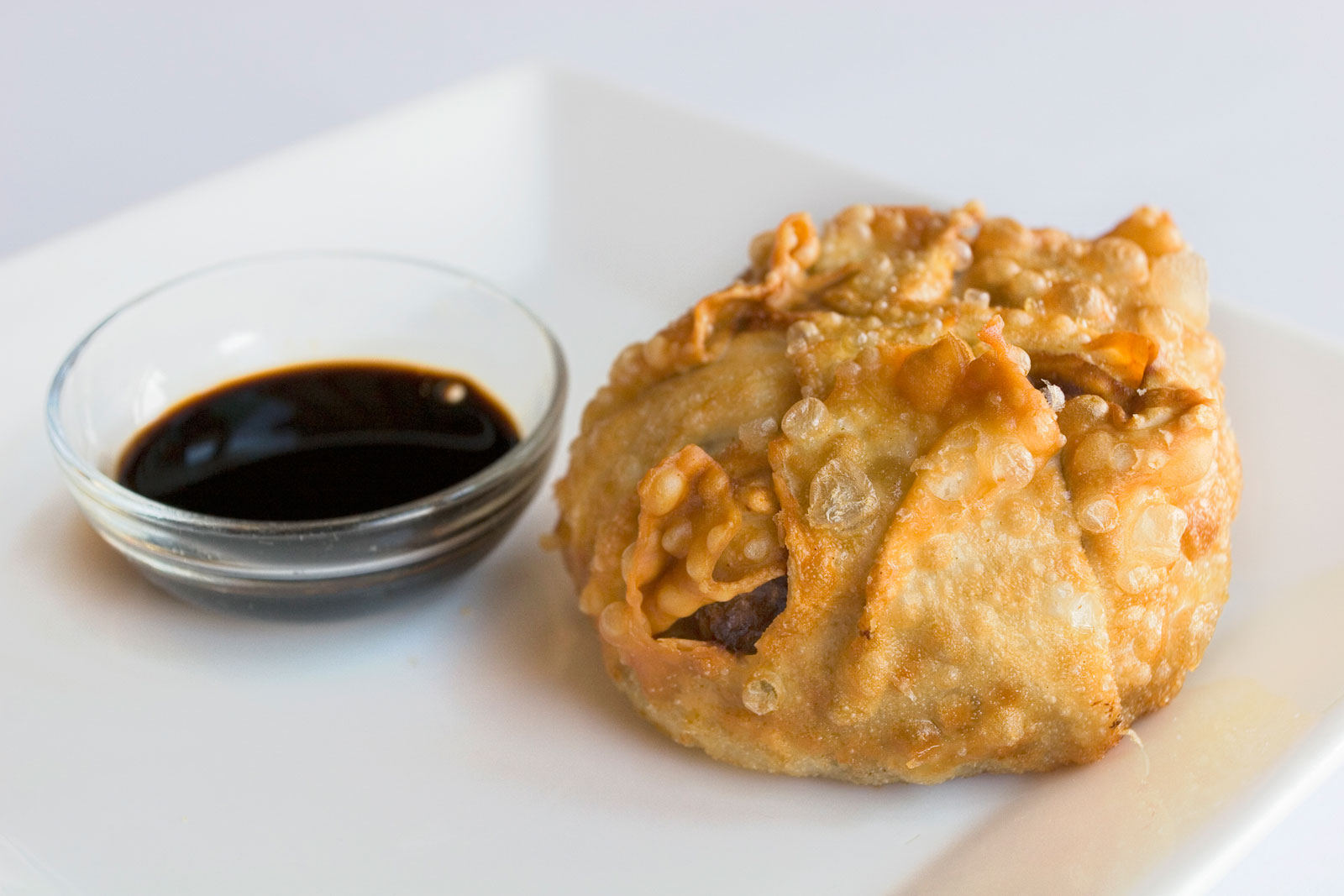
A deep-fried “South Melbourne” dim sim

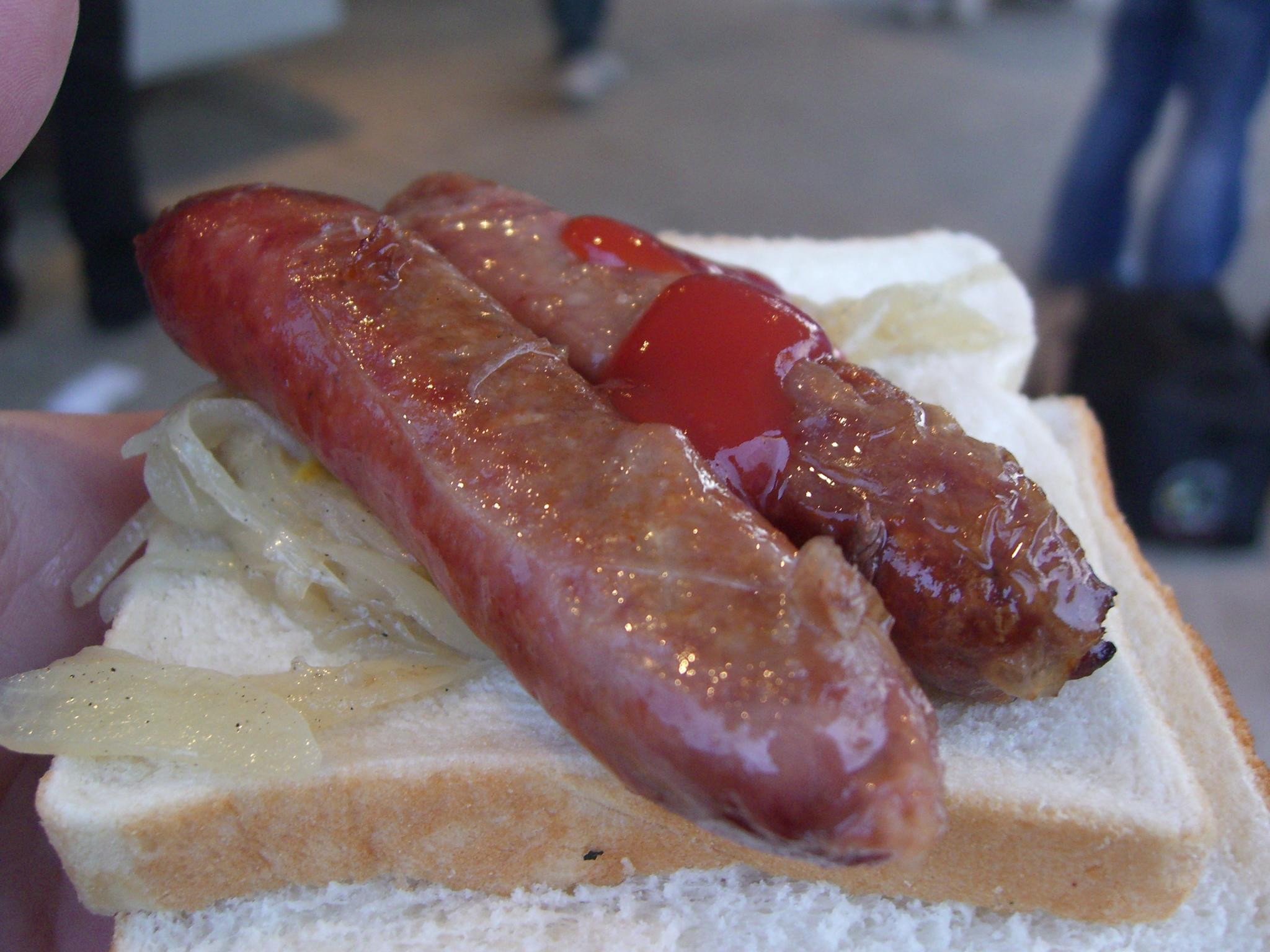
Sausages with onions in bread from a sausage sizzle

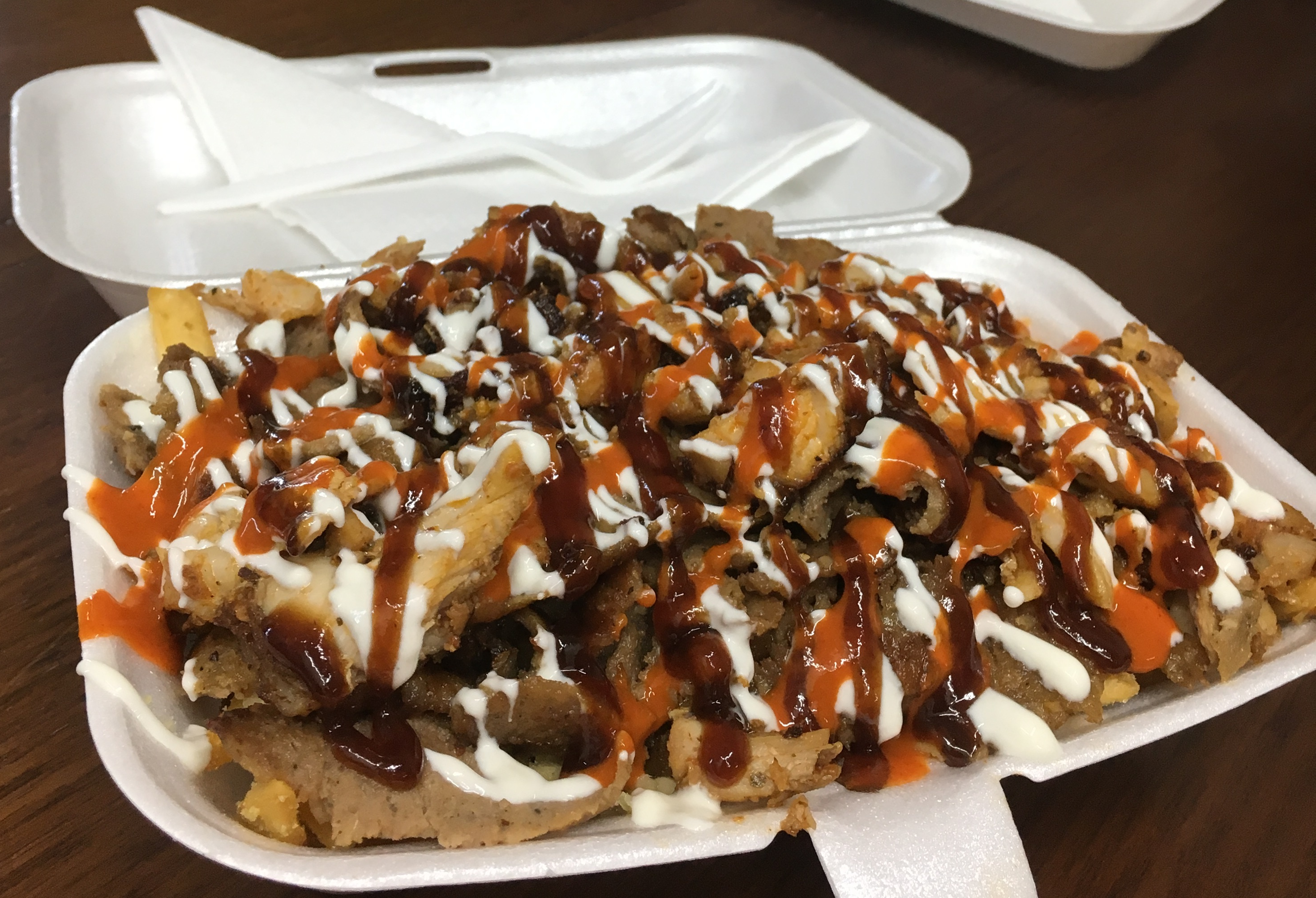
Halal snack pack

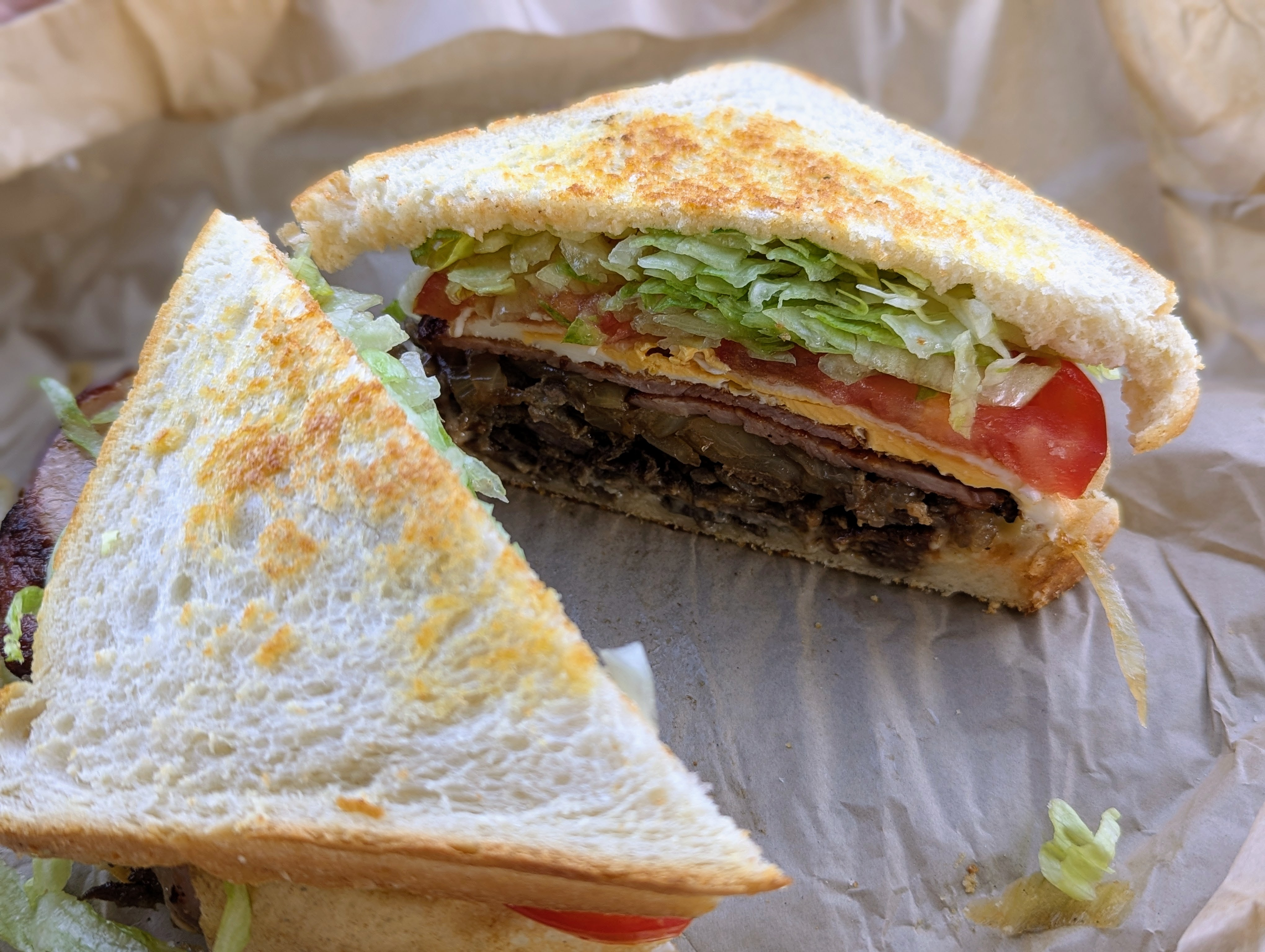
Steak sandwich with 'the lot'

The halal snack pack ("HSP", also known in South Australia as an AB) originated in Australia as a fusion of Middle Eastern and European flavours, common at kebab shops around Australia. It consists of doner kebab meat served over hot chips and covered in sauces (such as chilli, garlic, or barbecue sauce).

Sushi is a widely consumed takeaway food in Australia, commonly sold in shopping centres, food courts, and dedicated sushi outlets. A distinctive local format is the large, uncut sushi hand roll, typically wrapped in nori and filled with ingredients such as teriyaki chicken, tuna, salmon, and avocado. This style differs from traditional Japanese sushi in both portion size and flavour combinations, reflecting adaptation to Australian tastes. The rapid expansion of sushi outlets from the 1990s onward contributed to its mainstream popularity as an affordable lunch option. Franchise chains such as Sushi Sushi played a significant role in standardising and popularising the grab-and-go model nationwide.

Bánh mì is a Vietnamese sandwich that has become a prominent feature of Australia’s multicultural takeaway food culture. Introduced by Vietnamese migrants following increased migration from the 1970s, bánh mì became established in suburbs with significant Vietnamese communities, particularly in Sydney and Melbourne. Traditional fillings include cold cuts, pâté, pickled vegetables, coriander and chilli in a crusty baguette, while contemporary Australian variants often feature roast pork belly and other adaptations. Bánh mì is widely available beyond Vietnamese communities and is regarded as an affordable and portable lunch option across major Australian cities.

== Baked goods and desserts ==
Damper is a traditional Australian bread prepared by swagmen, drovers and other travellers. It is a wheat-flour-based bread, traditionally baked in the coals of a campfire. Toast is commonly eaten at breakfast. An iconic commercial spread is Vegemite, a salty, B vitamin-rich savoury spread made from brewers yeast eaten on buttered toast, commonly at breakfast, or in sandwiches. A common children's treat dating back to the 1920s is fairy bread, appearing around the same time as the Boston bun. A classic Australian biscuit is the ANZAC biscuit, which is often homemade and so-called as they were sent by families and friends to Australian soldiers fighting in Europe and the Dardanelles in the First World War. A popular commercial brand of biscuits is Arnott's Tim Tams.

A classic Australian cake is the lamington, made from two squares of butter cake or sponge cake coated in an outer layer of chocolate sauce and rolled in desiccated coconut. The food is sweet. Another popular cake and dessert dish is the pavlova, a meringue-based dessert; however, the origins of this are contested as New Zealand also lays claim to its invention. The Neenish tart is one more Australian baked good, with a pastry base, dried icing in two colours on top, and a filling of cream/jam. The mango pancake, a staple of Yum Cha restaurants in Sydney and elsewhere in Australia, is believed to have originated in Sydney in the late 1980s and early 1990s.

Australian baked foods and desserts
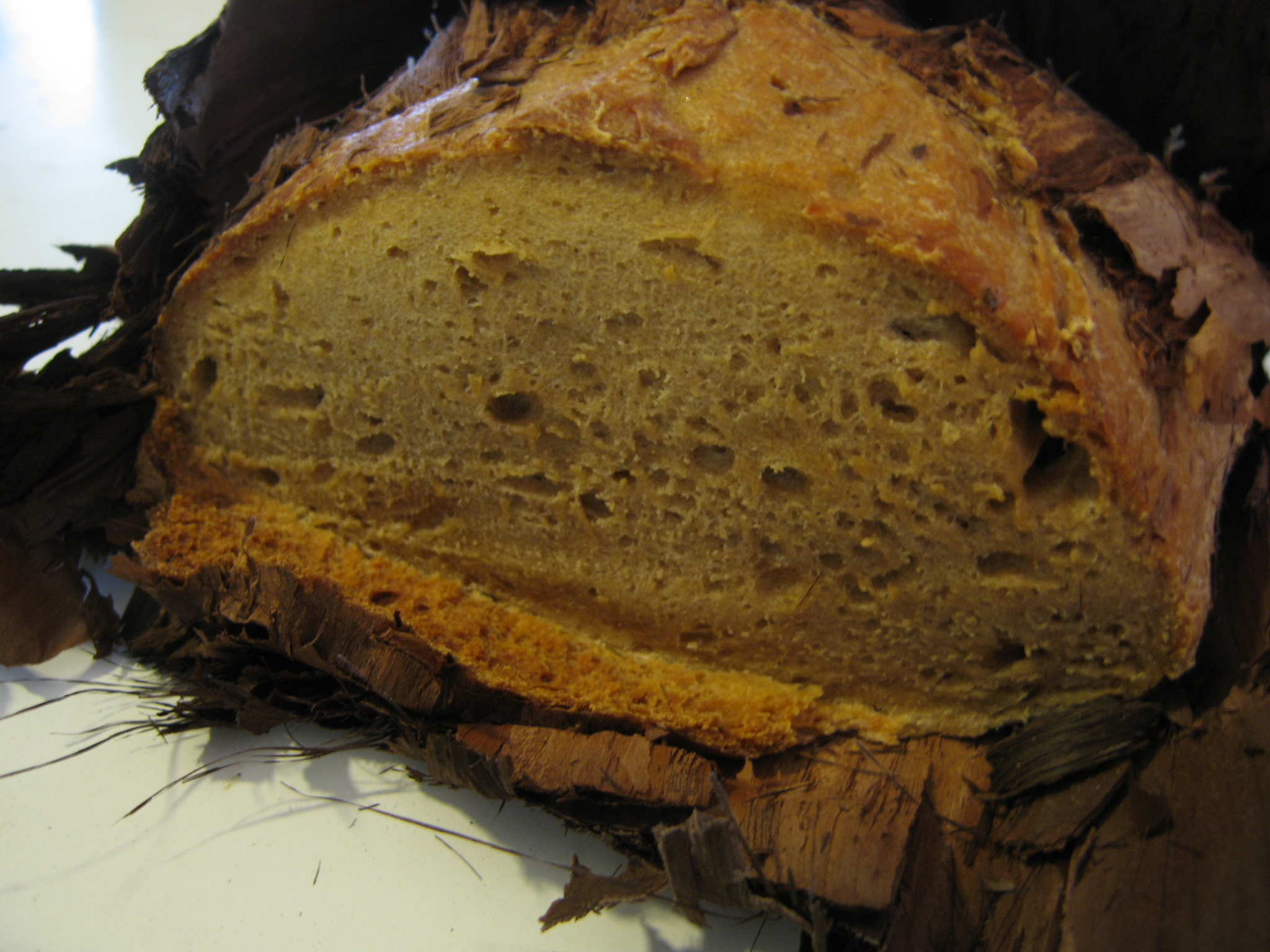
Damper (bread) is usually cooked over hot coals

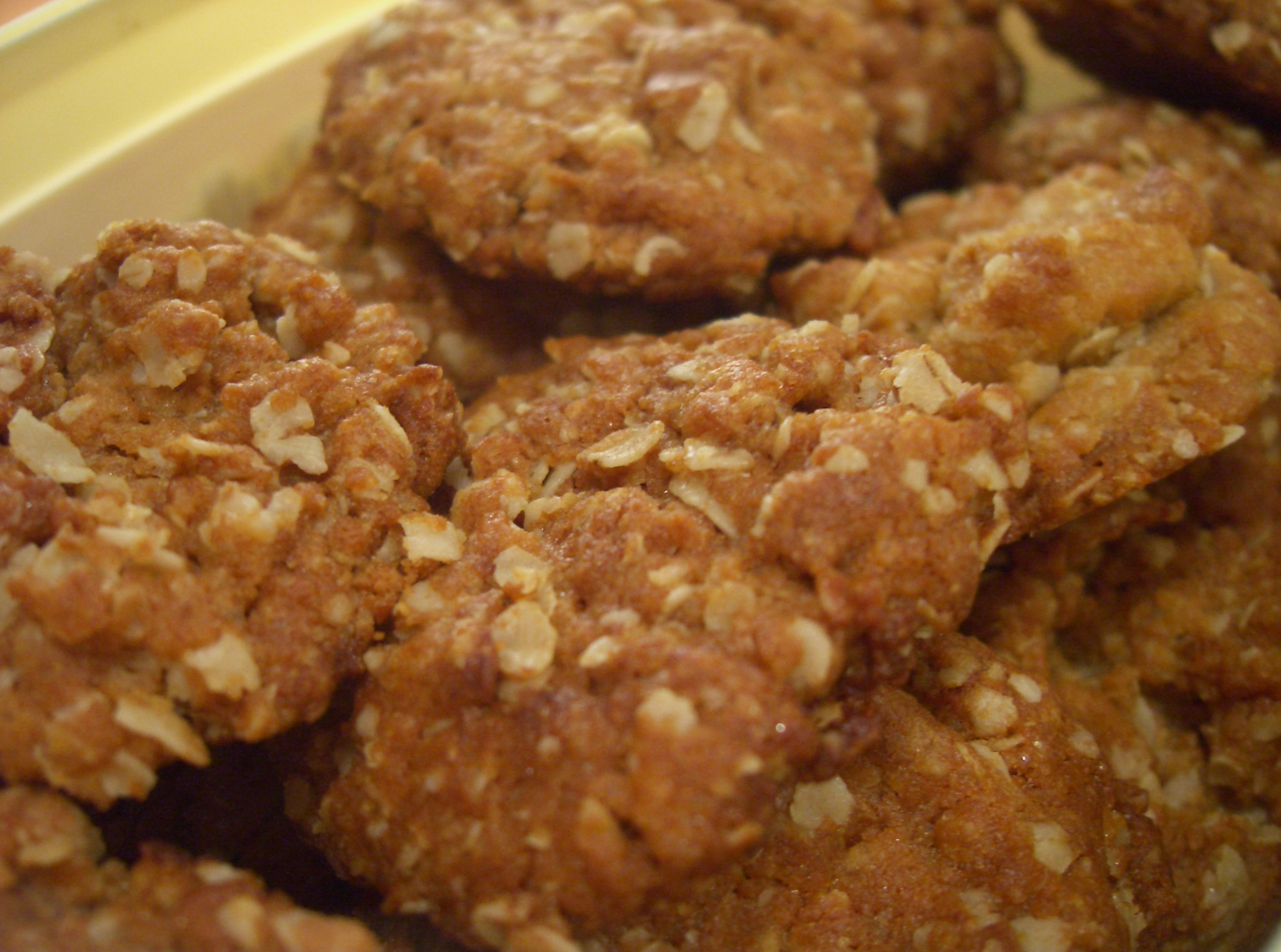
ANZAC biscuits, made with coconut

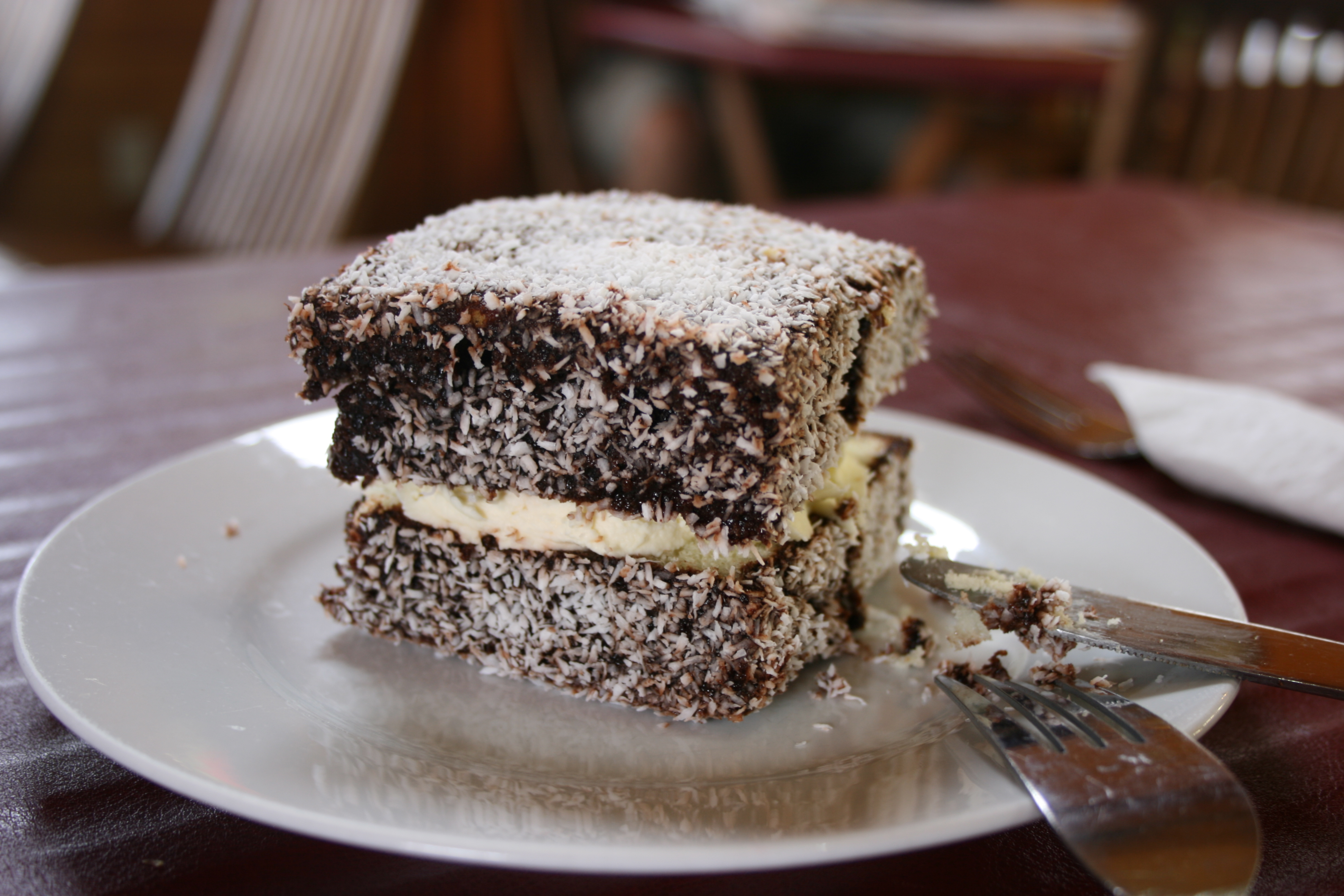
A cream-filled lamington

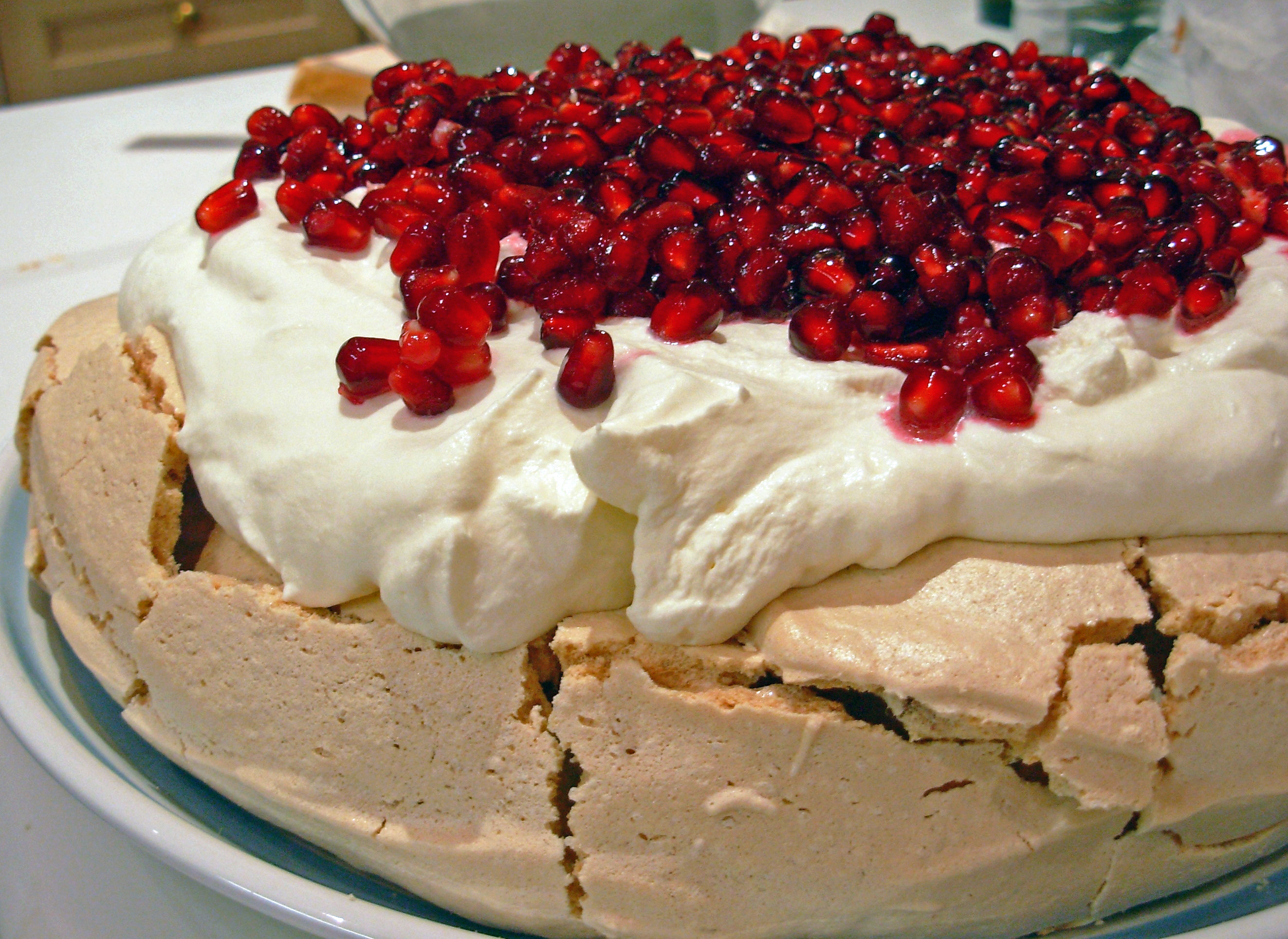
A pavlova garnished with pomegranates and cream

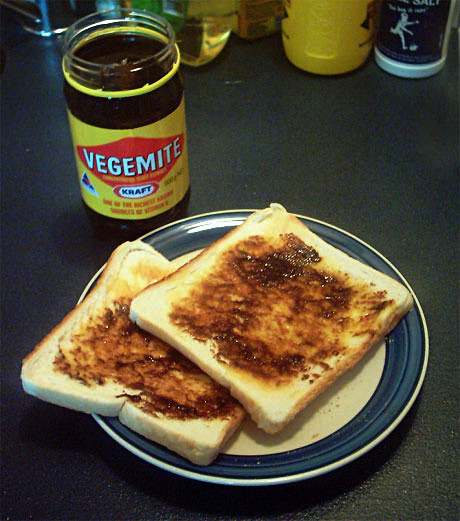
Vegemite on toast

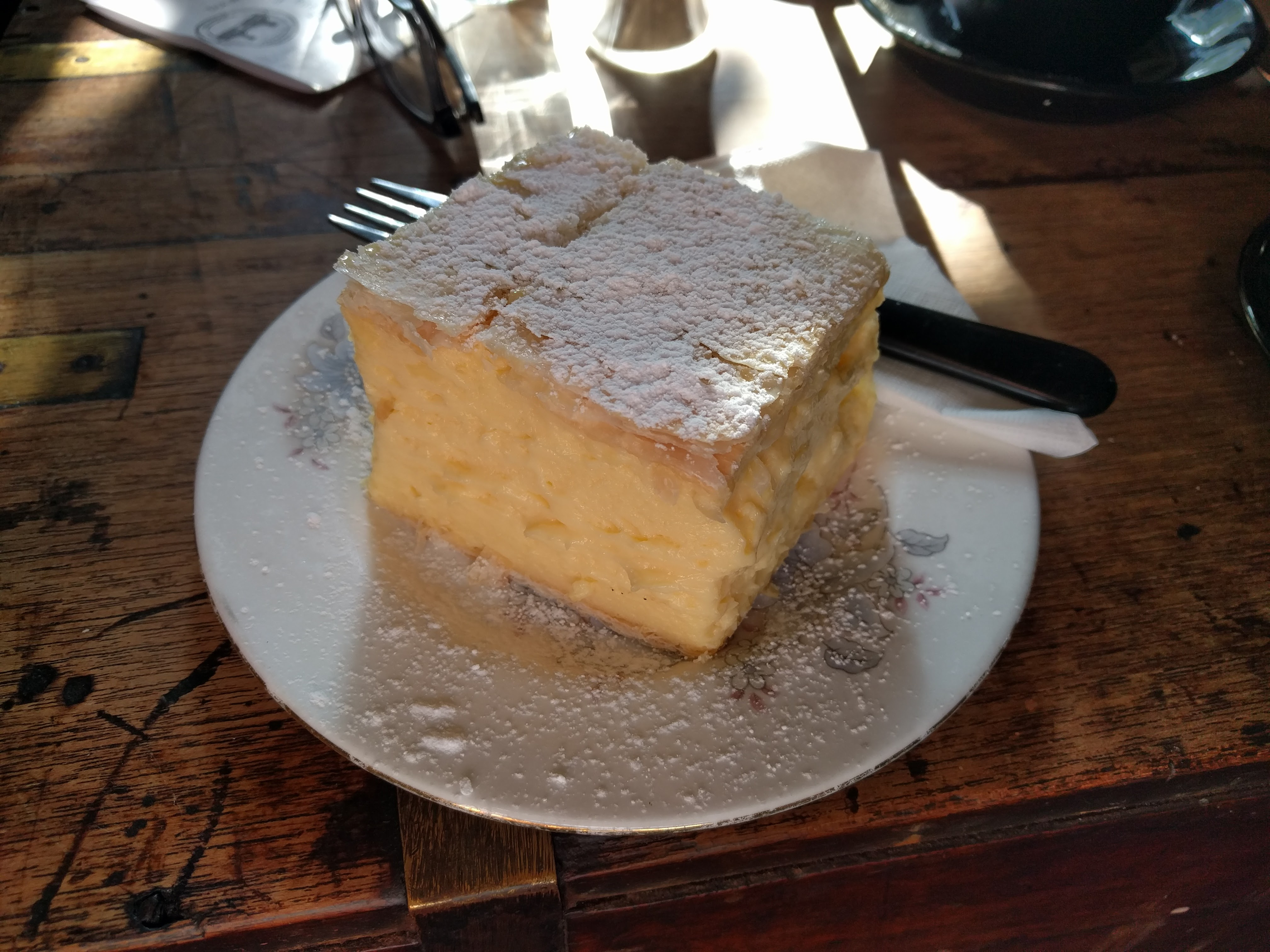
Vanilla slice

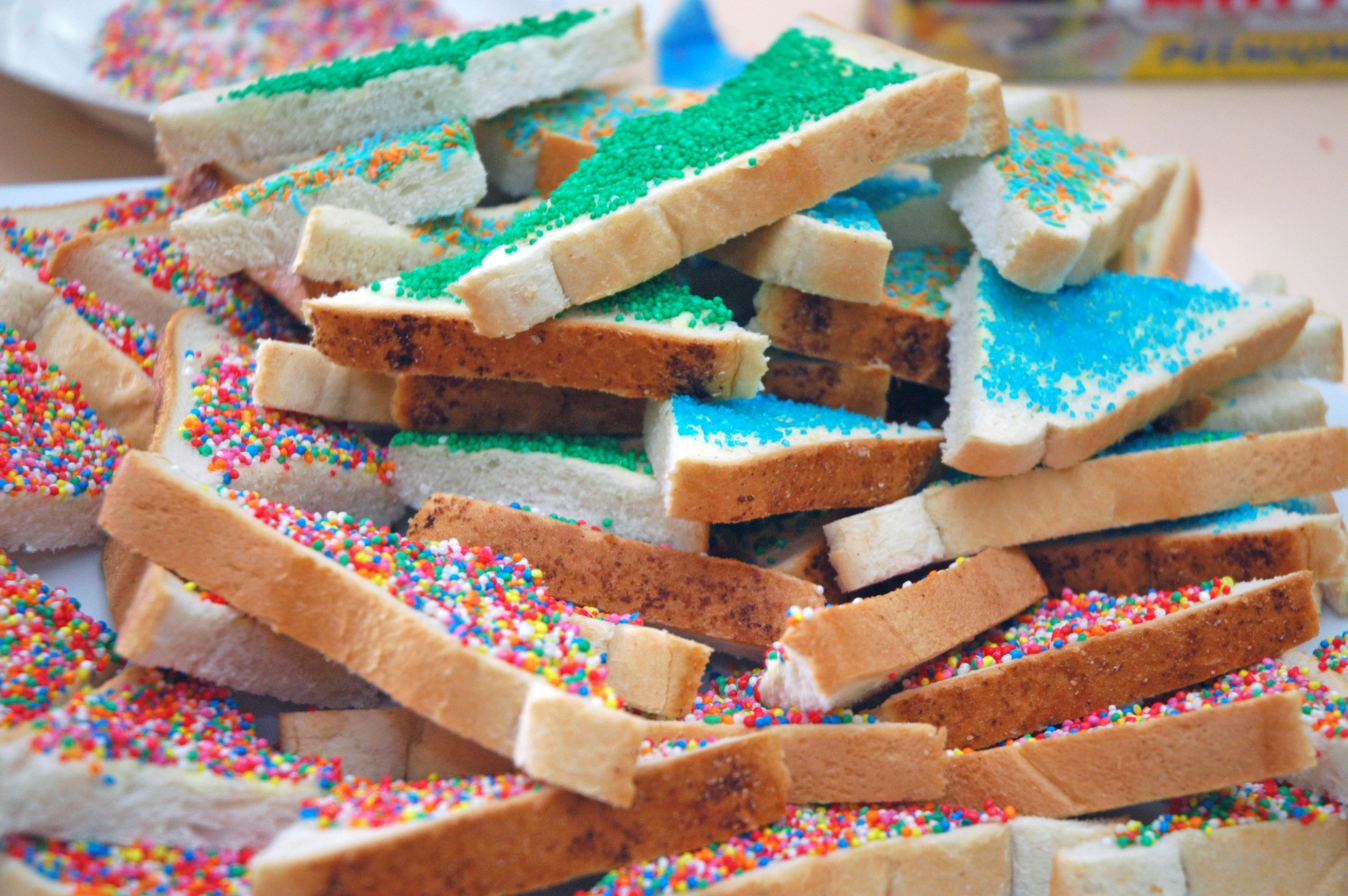
Fairy bread

== Regional cuisines ==
As well as national icons, Australia has many iconic regional cuisines.

=== New South Wales ===
Saccostrea glomerata, known in Australia as the Sydney rock oyster, or, more recently, as just the rock oyster, is a culinary delicacy in Sydney. Rock oysters are also popular in other NSW locations such as Merimbula; in 2025, Destination NSW reported that oyster trails, tours and tastings were supporting a rising demand for agritourism in that State. Endemic to Australia and New Zealand, rock oysters inhabit sheltered estuaries and bays between Hervey Bay, Queensland, and Wingan Inlet, Victoria (amongst other places in Australia), and are also commercially grown, predominantly on NSW's 2,000 km-long (1,200 mi) coastline.

An associated dish, carpetbag steak, became popular in Sydney in about 1950. As eaten in that city, it is made up of a thick cut of beef with a deep incision filled with rock oysters, usually dipped in Worcestershire sauce. Sometimes the filling is supplemented with butter, lemon juice, parsley, bread crumbs, or shredded cheese. The filled steak is then either pan-fried or oven-broiled, and most often served rare.

Carpetbag steak is not an Australian invention; it traces its origins to Mumbles, an oyster-fishing village in Swansea, South Wales, UK. But after finding favour in Sydney, its popularity spread, with local variations, to the United Kingdom, South Africa, and other places. In the United States, radio programs broadcast in the early 1950s associated the dish with Australia, as did news articles published in the 1970s, 1980s, and 2000s. Meanwhile, in Australia as a whole, carpetbag steak experienced "something of a heyday" in the 1950s and 1960s, and was an "iconic menu item" until the 1990s. As of 2025, it was still on the menu of Charcoal Restaurant, a long-established steak house in Canberra.

=== Queensland ===
Queensland has Weis Fruit Bar and claims the lamington. The cuisine of Brisbane derives from mainstream Australian cuisine, as well as many cuisines of international origin. Major native foods of the Brisbane region and commonly used in local cuisine include the macadamia, lemon-scented myrtle, Australian finger lime, bunya nut, and Moreton Bay bug. The city's cuisine culture is often described as casual with an emphasis on outdoor dining. Roof-top dining has become an iconic part of the culinary landscape, as well as a large street food scene with food trucks and pop-up bars common. Brisbane also lays claim to several foods including "smashed avo". Although popularised in Sydney in the 1990s, smashed avocado was a common dish in Brisbane and Queensland dating back to the 1920s.

Brisbane foods
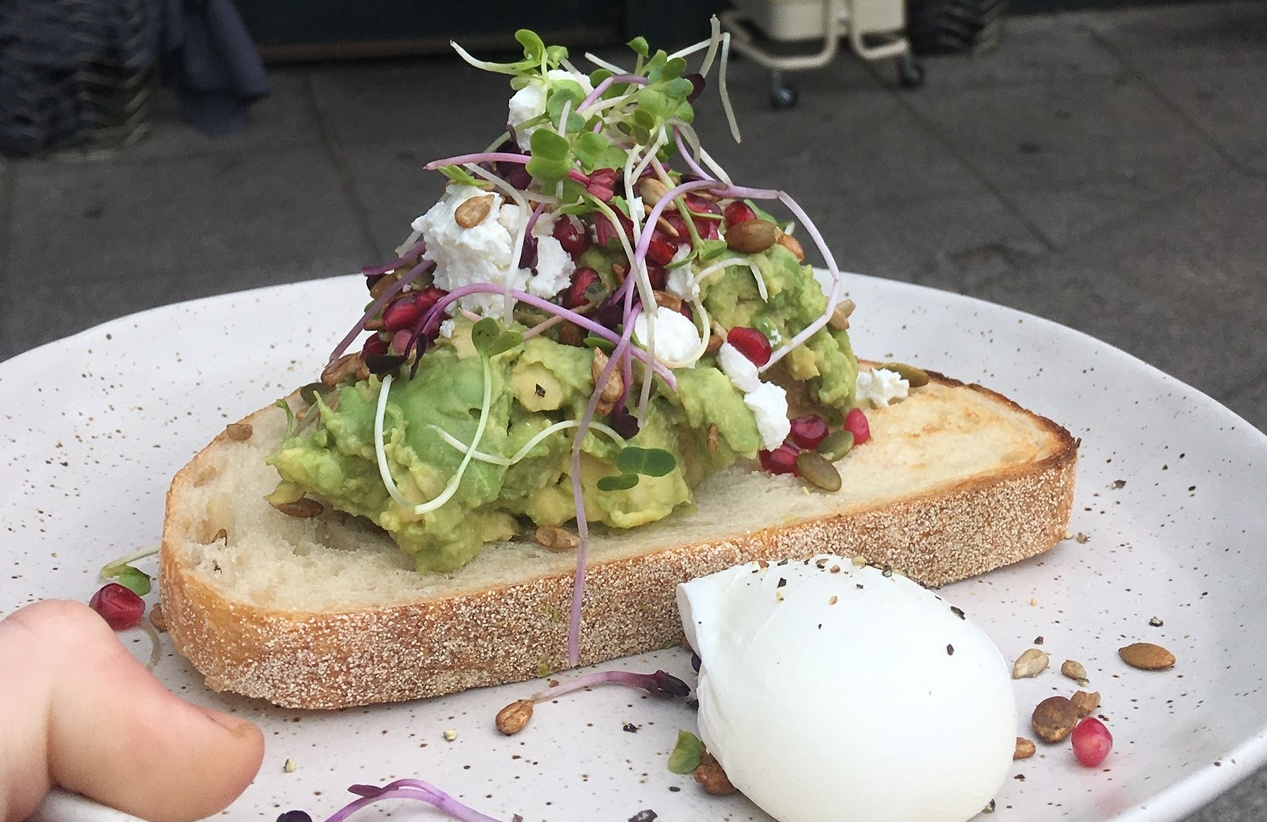
"Smashed avo"

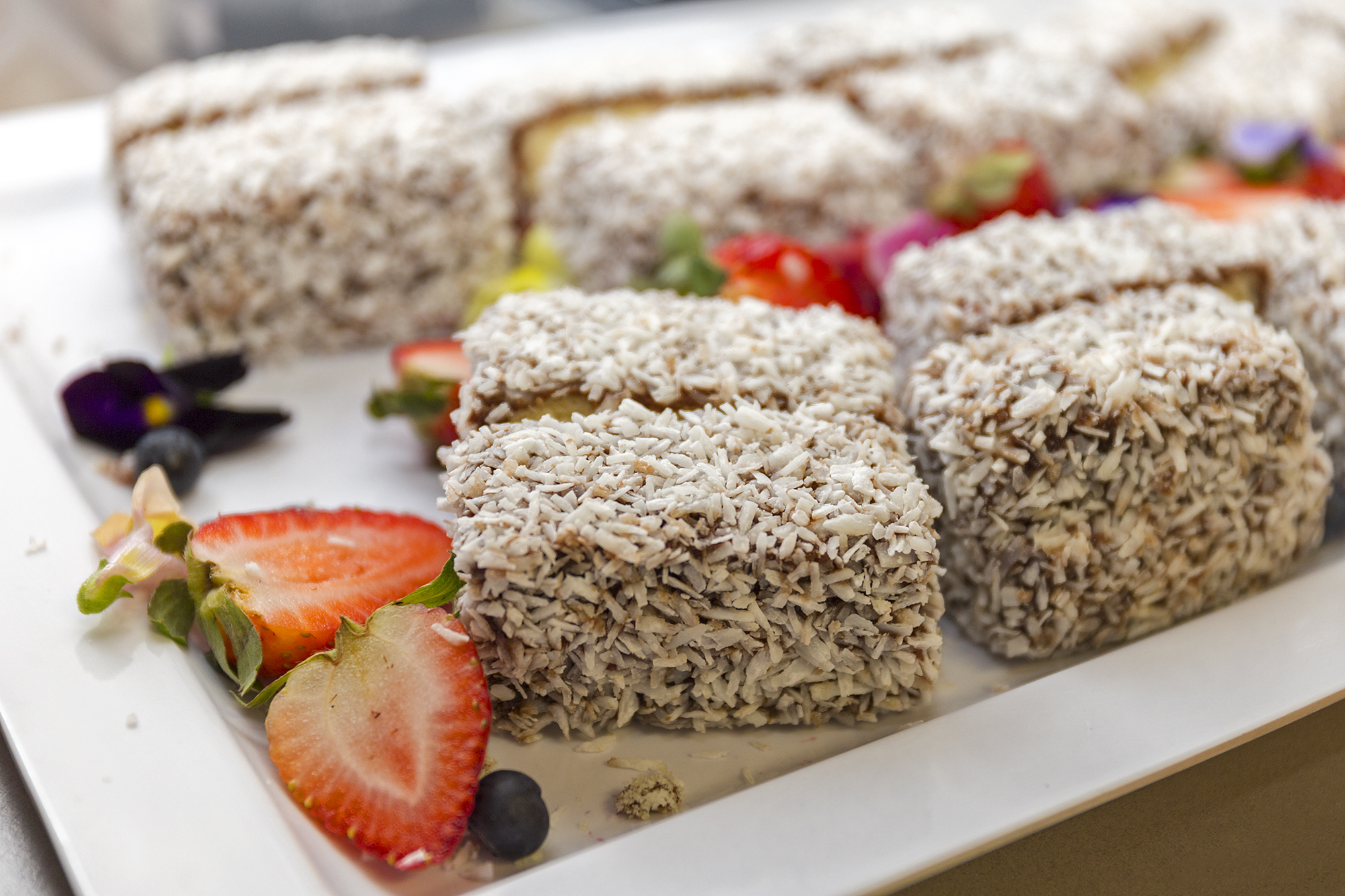
Lamington

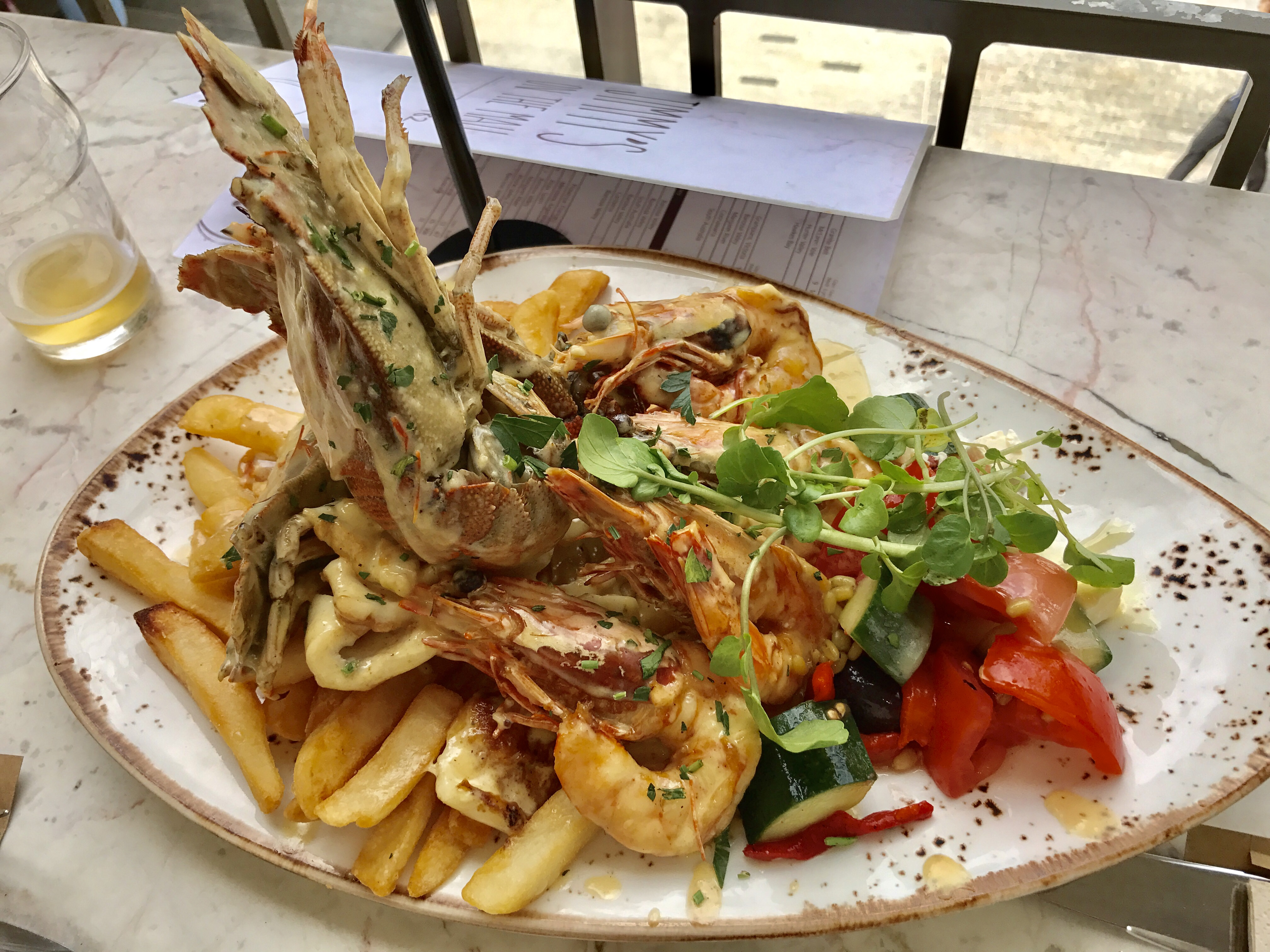
Moreton Bay bug with chips

=== South Australia ===
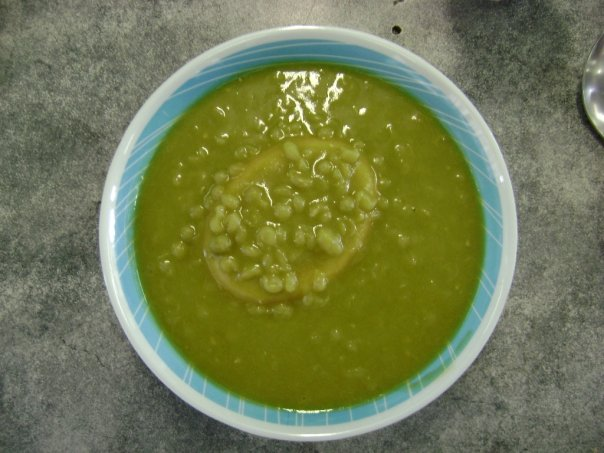
The famous pie floater of Adelaide

South Australia has FruChocs, King George whiting, and a range of foods of German origin including mettwurst, Bienenstich (beesting), streuselkuchen (German cake) and fritz.

The State also has its own iconic brands such as Farmers Union Iced Coffee, YoYo biscuits, and Balfours frog cakes. Jubilee cake is a specialty of South Australia, as is the Kitchener bun. In Adelaide, a variant on the meat pie is the pie floater, which is a meat pie served in a bowl of pea soup. Also, double-cut rolls, a bread roll sliced through the middle at two heights, each layer then filled making effectively two sandwiches out of one roll, is a South Australian specialty.

=== Tasmania ===
Tasmania has the scallop pie, leatherwood honey, abalone, and savoury toast.

=== Victoria ===
The Australian meat pie owes much of its status as an Australian food icon due to the Four'n Twenty pie company, established in Bendigo in 1947, mass-producing pies of a size that could be easily eaten standing and with one hand and selling them from their own fleet of vans at Australian Rules Football matches or at football oval kiosks. Piping hot meat pies then grew rapidly in popularity during the 1950s in Melbourne, where they became a welcome warming bite to eat at football matches on Melbourne’s all too common cold, rainy, and windy winter days.

Victoria is also famous for its home-grown Melbourne invention, the dim sim, which dates back to the 1940s, and another Bendigo invention, the Chiko Roll, which debuted in 1951. Melbourne is also the home of the hot jam donut.

=== Western Australia ===
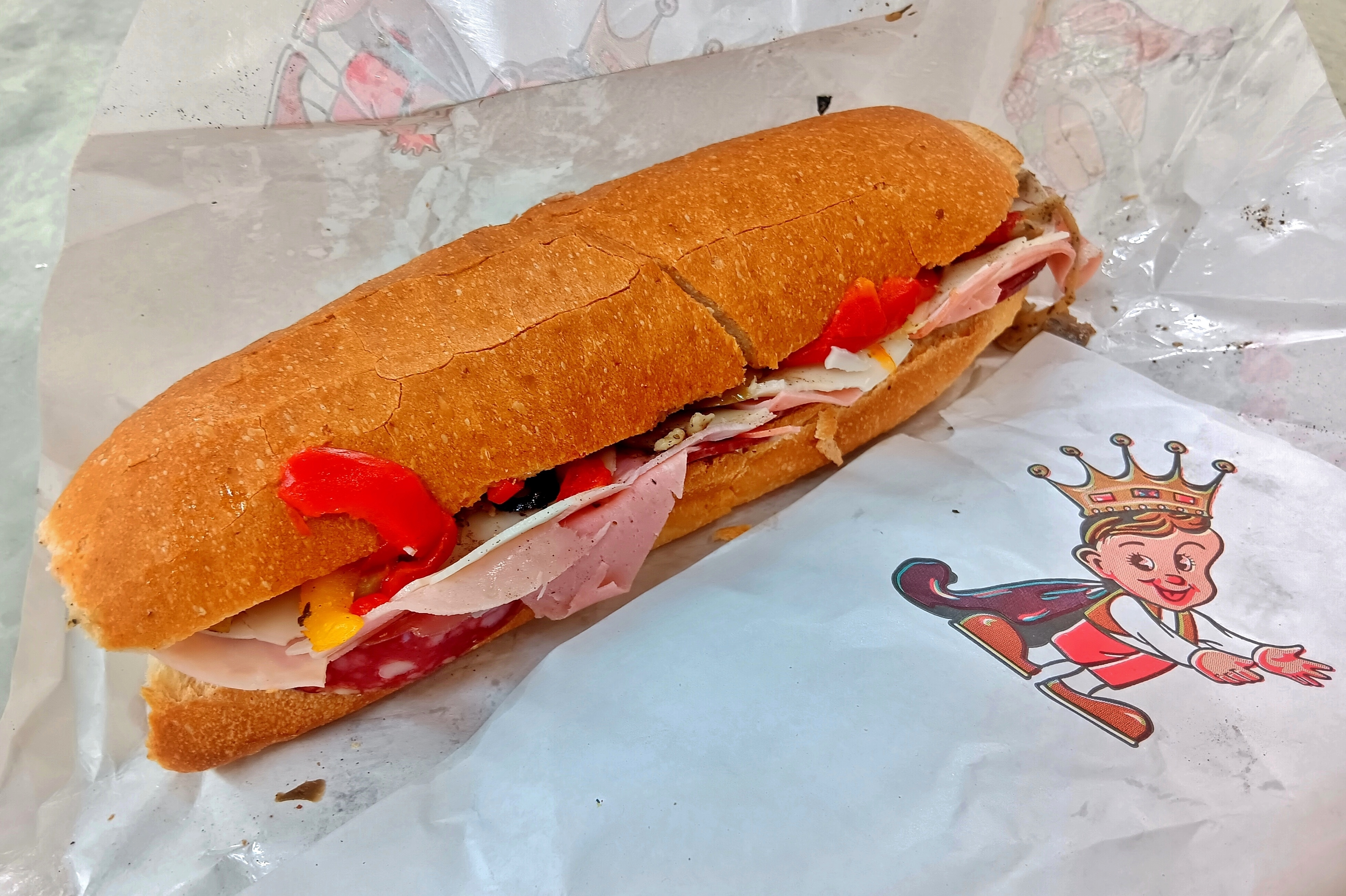
A Perth conti roll.

In Western Australia, the conti roll, or continental roll, is a popular sandwich. It has been described as both " ... a singularly Western Australian creation ..." and "... the closest thing ... West Australians have to a regional sandwich." Conti rolls may have been born, and certainly were raised, in the inner-city Perth locality now known as Northbridge.

Another WA treat is green-coloured, spearmint-flavoured milk. In the 1970s, Peter Kailis, co-founder of the WA-established, now national fast food chain Red Rooster, invented the Hawaiian Pack, made up of rotisserie chicken, a deep-fried banana, and a pineapple ring. As of 2025, Red Rooster was no longer selling a Hawaiian Pack. However, its "Box Meals" menu included a "Trop Box" with pineapple rings but no banana, and its WA-based rival Chicken Treat was offering a "Hawaiian Quarter" with "Pineapple Fritter, [and] Deep Fried Bananas". Other fast food outlets that originated in WA include Hungry Jack's and Nando's.

== See also ==
- List of Australian and New Zealand dishes
- Australian wine
- Australian whisky
- Chinese restaurants in Australia
- Culture of Australia
- Bush tucker
- Cuisine of Brisbane
- Australian Aboriginal sweets
