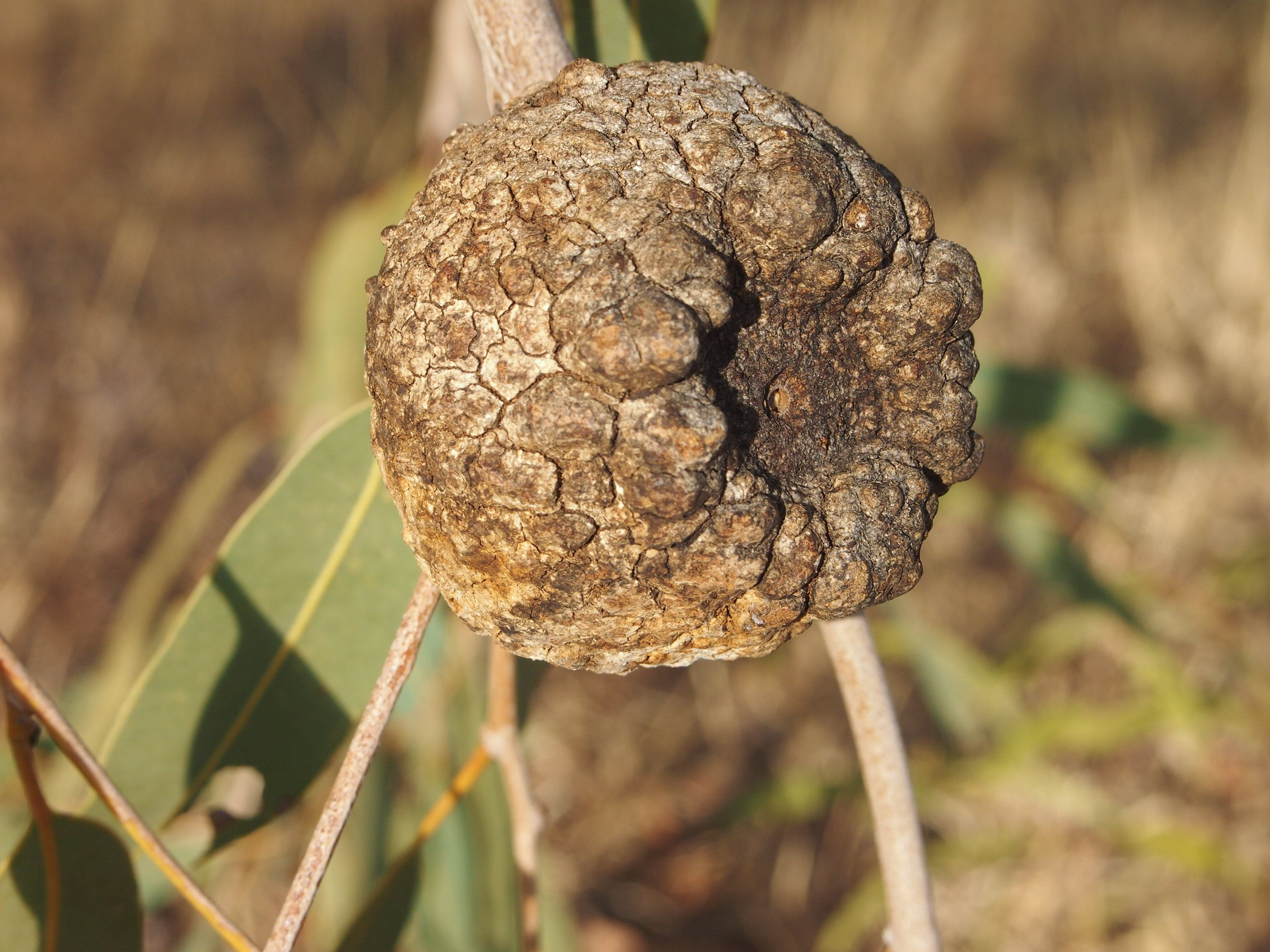

Scientific classification
- Kingdom: Animalia
- Phylum: Arthropoda
- Clade: Pancrustacea
- Class: Insecta
- Order: Hemiptera
- Suborder: Sternorrhyncha
- Family: Eriococcidae
- Genus: Cystococcus; Fuller, 1897

Species
- Cystococcus pomiformis (Froggatt, 1893); Cystococcus echiniformis Fuller, 1897; Cystococcus campanidorsalis Semple, Cook & Hodgson, 2015

= Bush coconut =

Edible gall made by a genus of insects

The bush coconut, or bloodwood apple, is an Australian bush tucker food. It is an insect gall with both plant and animal components: an adult female scale insect and her offspring (of genus Cystococcus) live in a gall induced on a bloodwood eucalypt tree (Corymbia). Bush coconuts can vary from golf ball to tennis ball size. They have a hard and lumpy outer layer. The inner layer is a white flesh that contains the female insect and her offspring. There are three known species of Cystococcus responsible for forming the bush coconut: Cystococcus pomiformis, Cystococcus echiniformis and Cystococcus campanidorsalis. C. pomiformis is the most common species. The bush coconut is found in Western Australia, the Northern Territory, Queensland and New South Wales.

The bush coconut is picked from the host tree and cracked open to allow the flesh and scale insects to be eaten. Both have a high protein content and are used as a food source by humans and other animals. The name 'bush coconut' is derived from the white flesh of the inner layer, which is similar in appearance to that of a coconut, and the taste of the flesh has been said to have a coconut flavour. The bush coconut has been depicted in Indigenous Australian dreaming and used as inspiration in their artwork.

== Discovery ==
The bush coconut was not mentioned in early documents about Aboriginal insect foods and is considered one of the lesser known bush tucker foods eaten by Aboriginals. The bush coconut was first described by Walter Wilson Froggatt in 1893 as Brachyscelis pomiformis. Froggatt collected material from northern and western Australia and listed two locations in his original description of the species: Torrens Creek, North Queensland and Barrier Range, King's Sound, North Western Australia. Froggatt noted Aborigines ate both the insect and soft flesh of the young gall. The species identified by Froggatt has been revised several times from Brachyscelis pomiformis to Apiomorpha pomiformis, Ascelis pomiformis and finally to Cystococcus pomiformis. Australian entomologist Claude Fuller briefly described another species of insect inducing the bush coconut, Cystococcus echiniformis, in 1897. Fuller provided a more detailed description along with line drawings of the adult female and its gall in 1899. Some scientists considered C. pomiformis and C. echiniformis to be of the genus Ascelis. This was, however, rejected in 1986 by P. J. Gullan and A. F. Cockburn who found that Ascelis and Cystococcus are closely related but distinct genera. They identified what they suspected as a third species in a paper published in 1986. This species was then named and formally described as C. campanidorsalis in 2015 by Semple et al. Bush coconuts are found on many different species of bloodwood eucalypts (Corymbia) across Australia.

== Description ==
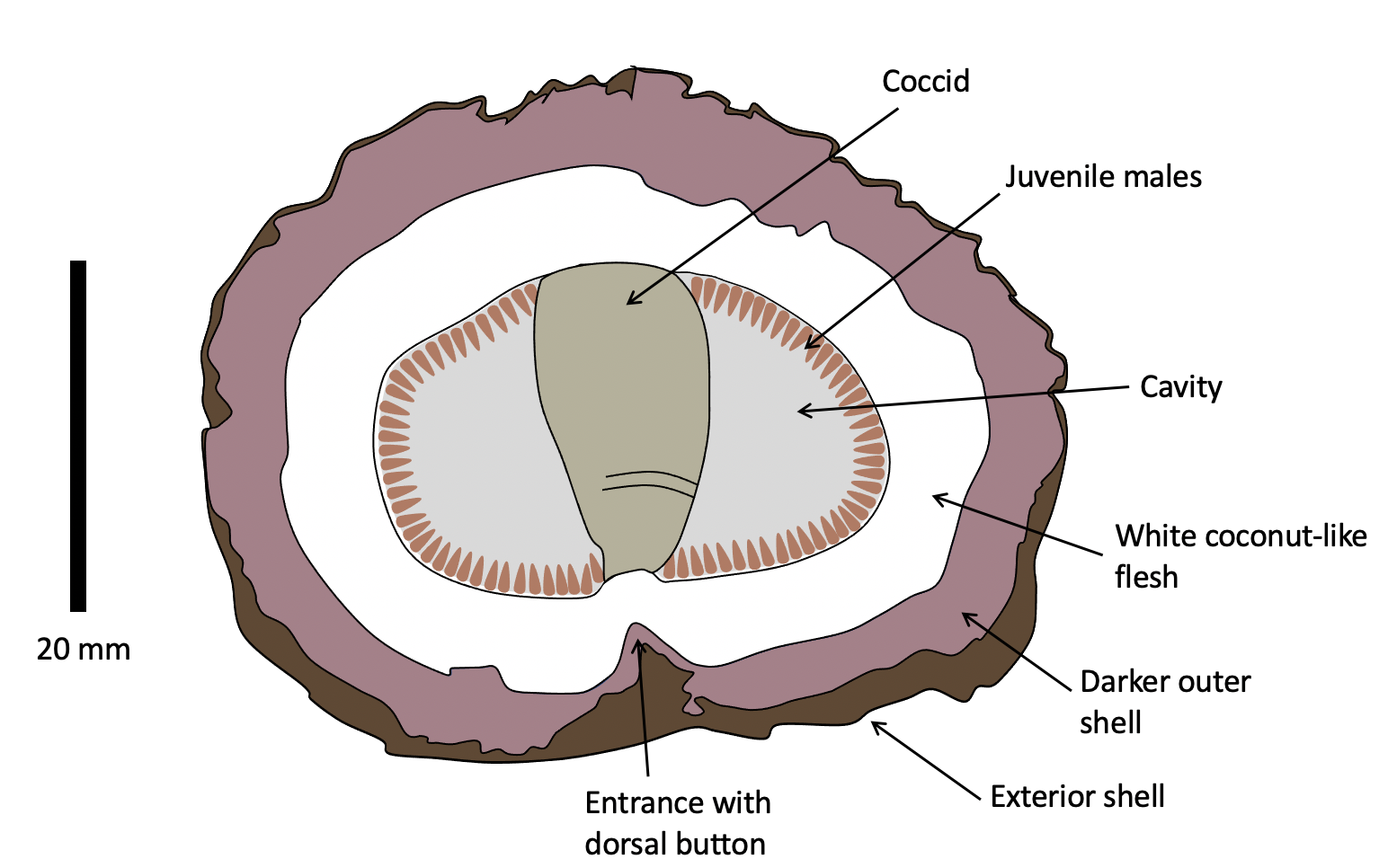
Cross-sectional diagram of a bush coconut

The bush coconut is an insect gall. It is a combination of plant and animal: an adult female scale insect lives in a gall induced on a Corymbia, the bloodwood eucalypt.

=== Scale insect ===
The insect inducing the gall is a coccid in the genus Cystococcus. Three species have been identified: C. pomiformis and C. campanidorsalis and C. echiniformis. The most common species is C. pomiformis. The live coccid is a yellow-green colour.

==== Female ====
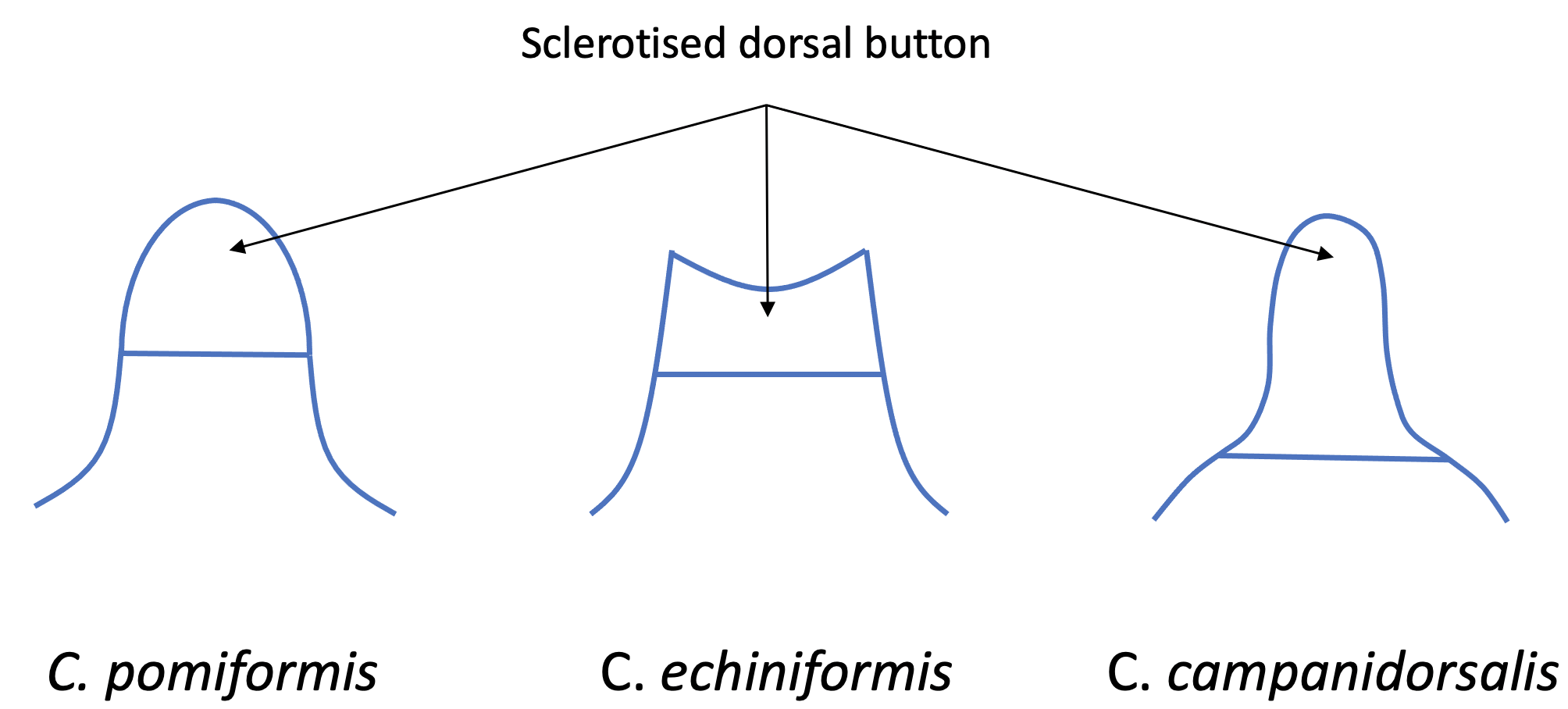
Sclerotised dorsal button of Cystococcus species C. pomiformis, C. echiniformis and C. campanidorsalis

The female Cystococcus has no legs, wings or antennae and has been described as 'grub-like'. Females grow up to 4 cm long. The body is elliptical to sub-spherical in shape and yellow-green in colour. The female scale insect lives within the fleshy interior of the gall. The female's anus is non-functional. Females are generally soft-bodied although sclerotisation produces a hard dorsal 'button' and ventral pore plates.

The button is used to plug the gall entrance and it is also the site where mating occurs. The shape of the button distinguishes the species of Cystococcus. This allows the female to be identified without opening the gall. C. pomiformis has a convex-shaped button that varies from broad and dome-shaped to pointy and conical, C. campanidorsalis has a bell-shaped button and C. echiniformis has a concave-shaped button.

Another distinguishing feature of the female scale insects is the pattern of their ventral pore-plates. Pore plates are an olfactory (smell) sense organ found in insects. In Cystoccocus, each pore plate of the adult female is composed of pores that are clustered together and surrounded by a sclerotised cuticle to form the plate. The pore plates function to produce a white, powdery wax when the insect is living. The function of this wax is unknown. C. echiniformis has unpatterned clustering of pore plates. The pore plates on C. campanidorsalis are clearly separated by transverse bands. C. pomiformis have pore plates that cluster around the vulva and are not clearly separated into transverse bands of sclerotisation.

The names of the three species of scale insect inducing bush coconuts reflect observable features. The name campanidorsalis comes from the bell-shaped button, with campana meaning bell in Latin, and that it is located dorsal rather than caudal. Pomiformis means 'apple-like' in Latin and refers to the shape and size of the gall C. pomiformis induces. Echiniformis is a Latin word meaning shaped like a hedgehog and may refer to the knobbled shape and uneven texture of the gall induced by C. echiniformis.

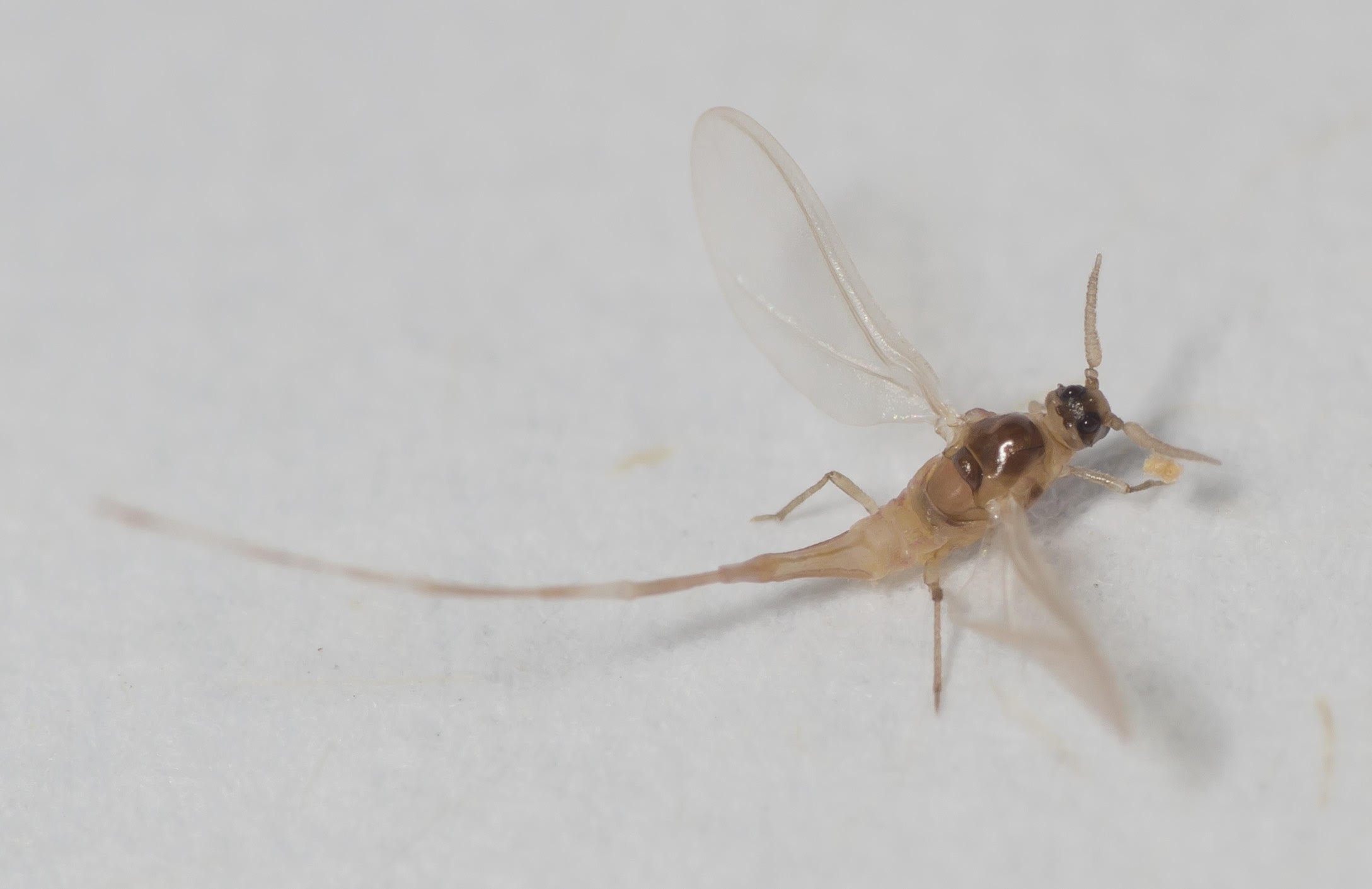
Adult male C. campanidorsalis

==== Male ====
It is difficult to distinguish different species of adult males within the genus Cystococcus. Adult male bodies are up to 9.5 mm long and they have an elongated abdomen which is likely an adaptation to enable mating through the gall entrance. Males have purple wings that allow the transport of the immature female offspring out of the gall. Each gall holds between 1700 and 4600 males.

=== Gall ===
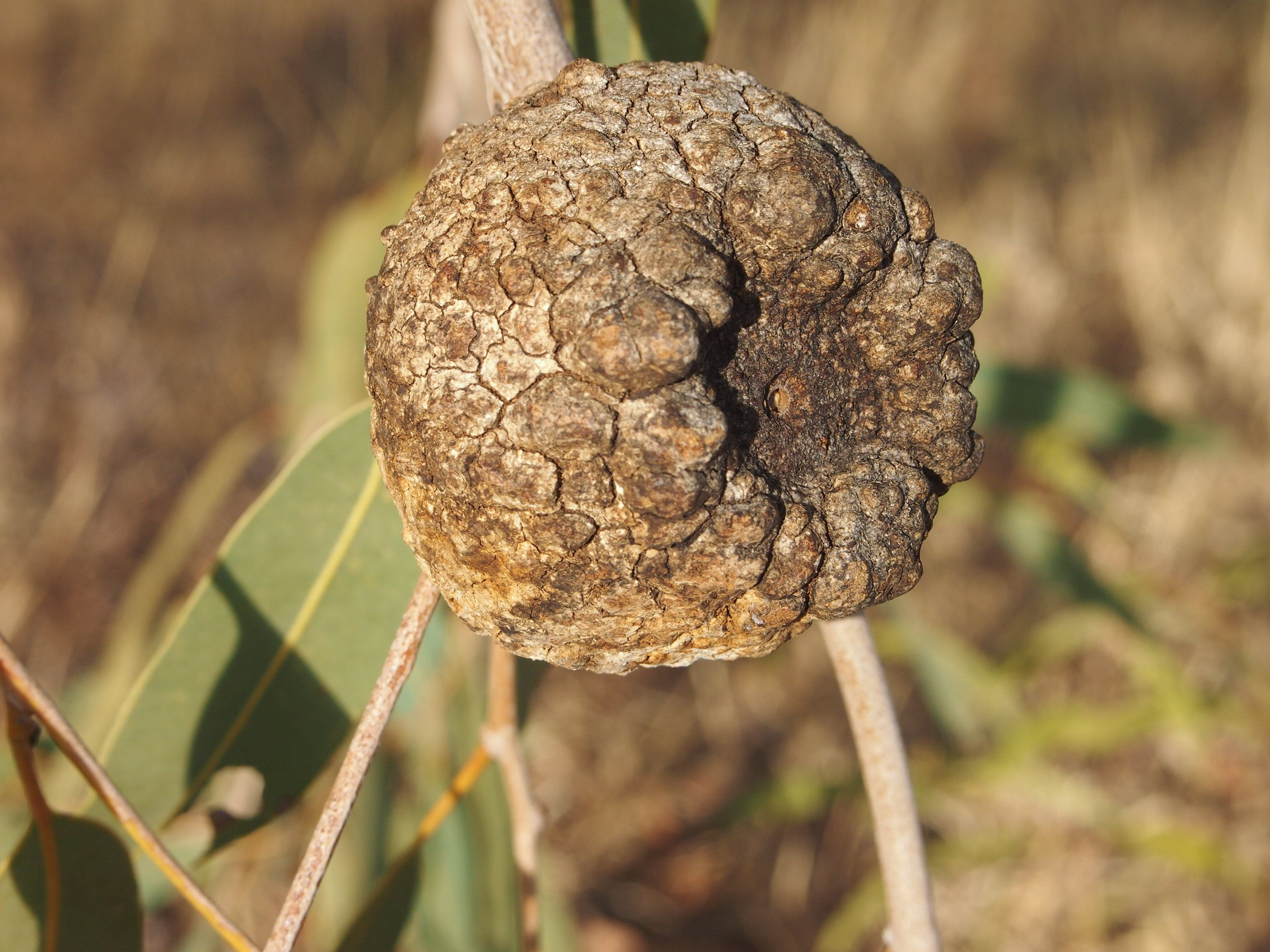
A bush coconut gall on Corymbia opaca containing living scale insects of genus Cystococcus

The bush coconut gall is an abnormal growth of plant tissue that occurs on the leaves, twigs or branches of the host tree. Bush coconut galls have an uneven surface and variable shape but they are generally spherical and have the appearance of a small fruit. The size of the galls varies within and between species, generally ranging from that of a golf ball to a tennis ball. The gall produced by C. pomiformis has the largest average size. The bush coconut gall has a hard outer layer and a soft, fleshy inside layer that lines the cavity housing the adult female scale insect. The outer layer has a surface texture ranging from smooth to lumpy and knobbled. The inner layer is a milky white flesh up to 1 cm in depth. The white flesh and cross-sectional appearance contribute to the name 'bush coconut' because they are similar in appearance to a coconut. The white flesh is also said to have a coconut-like taste. In mature galls, the female insect is attached to the inner wall at a thin attachment point with a small hole to the exterior. The female insect and her offspring feed off the fleshy layer.

The appearance of the galls differs slightly between species. C. campanidorsalis induce galls of diameter 18–28 mm and the gall surface usually has a loose, flaky outer layer that has colour ranging from light to dark brown. C. echiniformis induces galls with diameter of 16–49 mm. The surface texture varies from smooth to rough and the colour is generally cream-brown but changes to grey or black as the female insect ages and dies. C. pomiformis usually induce galls that have an uneven and lumpy surface with diameter 13–90 mm. The gall surface is usually pale and creamy-brown in colour when the insect is alive, but darkens and the surface becomes knobbled when the insect dies.

The most common host plant is the desert bloodwood, Co. terminalis, giving the bush coconut the alternative name of 'bloodwood apple'. The bush coconut gall has two leaf-life projections which may function to camouflage it from animals, including cockatoos and parrots, who may feed on the scale insect. Bush coconuts are usually found in clusters on small, young branches of the host tree. The lifespan of the bush coconut is 18 to 26 weeks.

== Ecology ==
The formation of the bush coconut gall is the result of a symbiotic relationship between the host and the female scale insect.

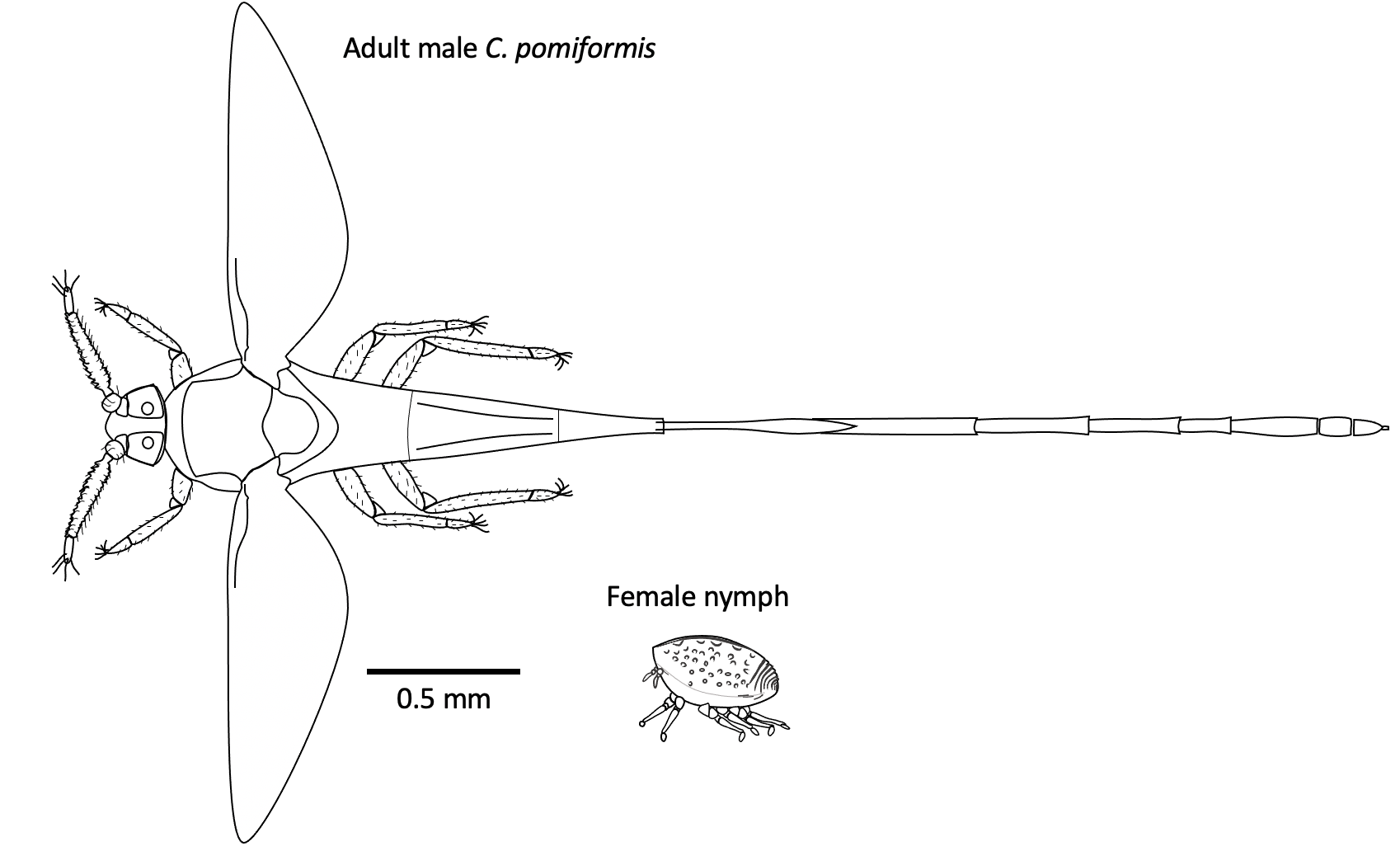
Adult male C. pomiformis with female nymph shown to scale

The inside flesh of the bush coconut provides protection for the female scale insect, as well as nourishment for her and her offspring. Reproduction occurs when a male coccid inserts its abdomen through a small hole in the gall to mate with the female. Reproduction involves a process known as sexual dichronism, in which the adult female controls the sex allocation of her offspring in order to produce males and females at different times. The adult female gives birth to the male offspring first. The males feed on the flesh of the bush coconut and develop into winged adults. Once the males have almost matured within the gall, female offspring are produced. When the mother dies, the immature wingless female offspring are transported out of the maternal gall on their male brothers' elongated abdomens and deposited onto a host tree to start the cycle again. The males then fly off to find mates.

== Distribution and habitat ==
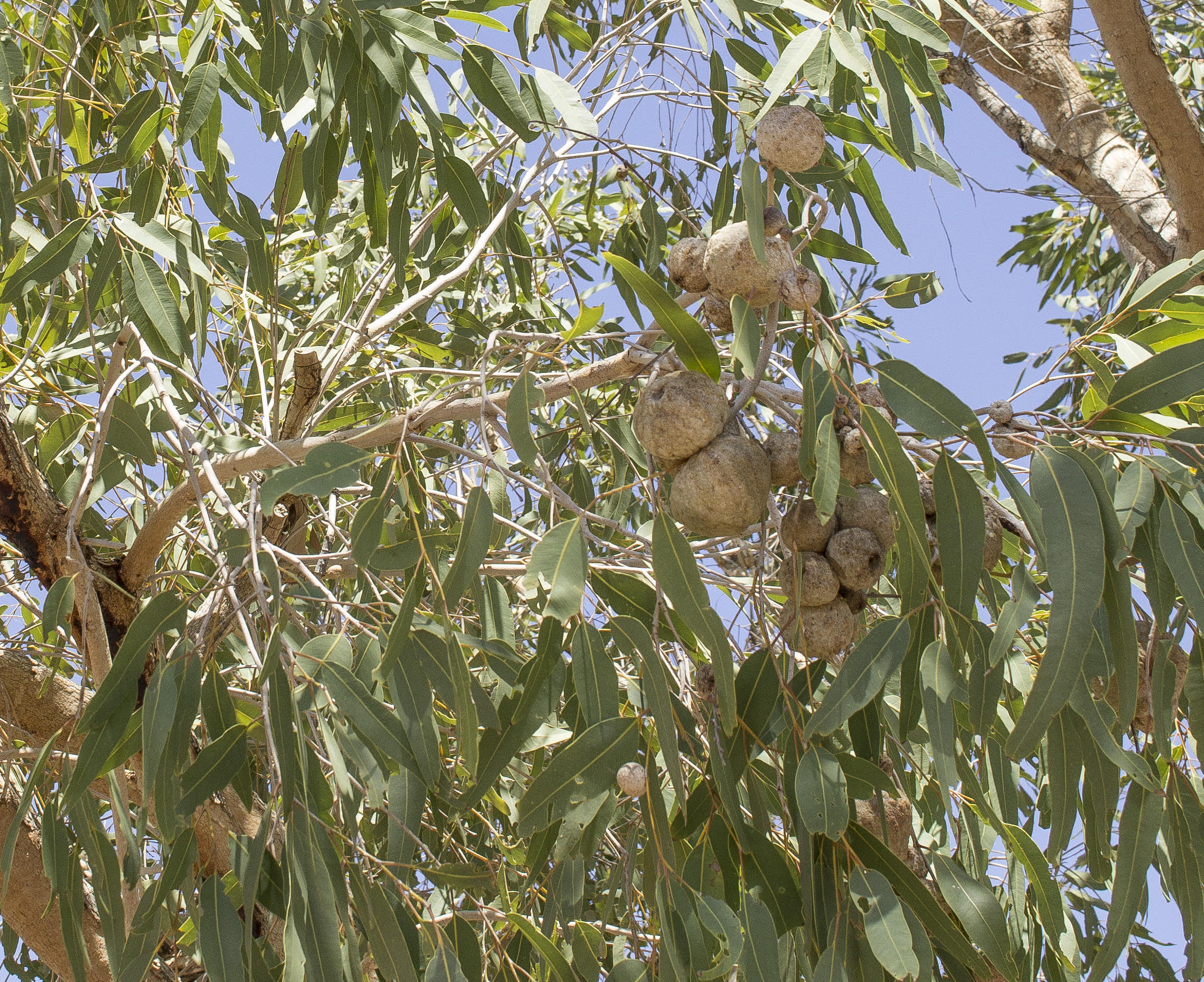
Cluster of bush coconuts (genus Cystococcus) on a bloodwood eucalypt tree (Corymbia)

The bush coconut is commonly found in the savannah woodlands and dry sclerophyll forests of northern and central Australia, but populations have been found in Queensland, Western Australia and New South Wales. Bush coconuts are also found in the popular tourist destination, Alice Springs Desert Park in the Northern Territory.

C. pomiformis has been found in north Western Australia, the Northern Territory and Queensland. Host trees include Co. cliftoniana, Co. collina, Co. deserticola, Co. dichromophloia, Co. drysdalensis, Co. erythrophloia, Co. hamersleyana, Co. intermedia and Co. terminalis. C. echiniformis is found in north Western Australia, the Northern Territory, west Queensland and far-north-west New South Wales. Host trees include Co. chippendalei, Co. clarksoniana, Co. foelscheana, Co. greeniana, Co. lenziana, Co. polycarpa, Co. ptychocarpa and Co. terminalis. C. campanidorsalis was first found in central Brisbane in 2015. The only known host tree is Co. trachyphloia.

== Cultivation and use ==
Bush coconuts are often collected during the cold season, usually in April or May, while they still contain the living insect. They are picked from the host tree and then cracked open with a rock or other hard object. The gall may be softened by placing it on hot ashes. The flesh lining of the gall is scraped out and the insect and flesh are consumed. The bush coconut is a food source for Indigenous Australians and also for birds and other insects. The insect has a sweet, juicy taste and high water content. The water inside the insect is known as the bush coconut juice. The galls provide shelter for arthropods including tree crickets, ants and spiders.

== Nutrition ==
Bush coconuts provide a good source of protein to the diet. A research study of the nutrition of the bush coconut from Cystococcus pomiformis living in a gall on the Corymbia opaca found both male and female insects have high protein content and high gross energy. The range of gross energy was 15.12 to 25.13 MJ/kg for females and 22.56 to 26.87 MJ/kg for males. The lining of the gall, in comparison, has lower gross energy with a range of 14.15 to 16.67 MJ/kg.

== Cultural significance ==
The bush coconut is known to the Arrernte of Central Australia, the Gija of Western Australia, and the Warumungu and Warlpiri of Northern Territory, each with their own names for the food source.

== See also ==
- Mulga apple - Another gall used as bush tucker.
