= Acacia aneura var. major =

Scientific classification
- Kingdom: Plantae
- Clade: Tracheophytes
- Clade: Angiosperms
- Clade: Eudicots
- Clade: Rosids
- Order: Fabales
- Family: Fabaceae
- Subfamily: Caesalpinioideae
- Clade: Mimosoid clade
- Genus: Acacia
- Species: A. aneura
- Variety: A. a. var. major

Trinomial name
- Acacia aneura var. major Pedley (2001)

Synonyms
- Racosperma aneurum var. majus (Pedley) Pedley (2003)

Variety of shrub or small tree

Acacia aneura var. major is a perennial tree native to Australia. It grows in New South Wales, Northern Territory, Queensland, and South Australia.

== See also ==
- List of Acacia species
