= Acacia aneura var. microcarpa =

Scientific classification
- Kingdom: Plantae
- Clade: Tracheophytes
- Clade: Angiosperms
- Clade: Eudicots
- Clade: Rosids
- Order: Fabales
- Family: Fabaceae
- Subfamily: Caesalpinioideae
- Clade: Mimosoid clade
- Genus: Acacia
- Species: A. aneura
- Variety: A. a. var. microcarpa

Trinomial name
- Acacia aneura var. microcarpa Pedley

Variety of legume

Acacia aneura var. microcarpa is a perennial shrub or tree endemic to Australia, in the Northern Territory and Western Australia.

== See also ==
- List of Acacia species
