= Acacia aneura var. pilbarana =

Scientific classification
- Kingdom: Plantae
- Clade: Tracheophytes
- Clade: Angiosperms
- Clade: Eudicots
- Clade: Rosids
- Order: Fabales
- Family: Fabaceae
- Subfamily: Caesalpinioideae
- Clade: Mimosoid clade
- Genus: Acacia
- Species: A. aneura
- Variety: A. a. var. pilbarana

Trinomial name
- Acacia aneura var. pilbarana Pedley

Variety of legume

Acacia aneura var. pilbarana, commonly known as Mulga, is a perennial shrub native to Western Australia. Acacia aneura var. pilbarana has ten recognized varieties, six of which are found in the Pilbara region. The description covers the plant's physical characteristics, including its height, branch structure, phyllodes, inflorescences, sepals, and pods. The plant is distributed in the Hamersley Range, Coondewanna Flats, and Fortescue River valley, thriving in red-brown clay-loam or sandy loam on alluvial flats and creeks.

The flowering period generally spans from March to May, with occasional blooming in June and July, following summer and winter rains, respectively. The differences between var. pilbarana and its close relative, var. tenuis notable distinctions include pod characteristics and phyllode shapes, though their reliability for classification is still under investigation. Acacia aneura var. pilbarana is not considered rare or endangered and derives its name from the predominant area of occurrence.

== See also ==
- List of Acacia species
