= Corymbia deserticola =

Scientific classification
- Kingdom: Plantae
- Clade: Embryophytes
- Clade: Tracheophytes
- Clade: Spermatophytes
- Clade: Angiosperms
- Clade: Eudicots
- Clade: Rosids
- Order: Myrtales
- Family: Myrtaceae
- Genus: Corymbia
- Species: C. deserticola

Binomial name
- Corymbia deserticola (D.J.Carr & S.G.M.Carr) K.D.Hill & L.A.S.Johnson

Synonyms
- Eucalyptus deserticola D.J.Carr & S.G.M.Carr nom. inval.; Eucalyptus deserticola D.J.Carr & S.G.M.Carr; Eucalyptus desertorum D.J.Carr & S.G.M.Carr nom. illeg., nom. superfl.

Species of plant

Corymbia deserticola is a species of straggly tree, a mallee or a shrub that is native to Western Australia and the Northern Territory. It has rough, tessellated bark on the trunk and branches, mostly sessile, heart-shaped leaves arranged in opposite pairs, flower buds in groups of seven on each branch of a peduncle, creamy yellow flowers and urn-shaped to shortened spherical fruit.

== Description ==
Corymbia deserticola is a species of straggly tree or a mallee that typically grows to a height of 6 m (20 ft), sometimes a shrub to 1 m (3 ft 3 in), and forms a lignotuber. It has thick, rough, flaky, deeply fissured, brownish bark on the trunk and branches. Young plants and coppice regrowth have leaves that are sessile, the same shade of green on both sides, heart-shaped, 35–70 mm (1.4–2.8 in) long and 18–40 mm (0.71–1.57 in) wide and arranged in opposite pairs. Adult leaves are sessile and stem-clasping or shortly petiolate, the same shade of pale green on both sides, usually heart-shaped, 20–62 mm (0.79–2.44 in) long and 10–35 mm (0.39–1.38 in) wide. The flowers are arranged on the ends of branchlets on a branched peduncle 5–12 mm (0.20–0.47 in) long, each branch of the peduncle with seven buds on pedicels 2–6 mm (0.079–0.236 in) long. Mature buds are oval to pear-shaped, 5–6 mm (0.20–0.24 in) long and 3–4 mm (0.12–0.16 in) wide with a conical to slightly beaked operculum. The flowers are creamy yellow and the fruit is a woody urn-shaped to shortened spherical capsule 9–17 mm (0.35–0.67 in) long and wide, with the valves enclosed in the fruit.

== Taxonomy and naming ==
This eucalypt was first formally described in 1987 by Denis Carr and Maisie Carr and given the name Eucalyptus deserticola but the name was not valid. That name was validated by publication in 1988 in the Flora of Australia. In 1995 Ken Hill and Lawrie Johnson changed the name to Corymbia deserticola in the journal Telopea. The specific epithet (deserticola) is derived from the Latin desertum meaning "desert" and -cola meaning "-dweller".

In the same journal, Hill and Johnson described two subspecies and the names are accepted by the Australian Plant Census:

- Corymbia deserticola (D.J.Carr & S.G.M.Carr) K.D.Hill & L.A.S.Johnson subsp. deserticola;
- Corymbia deserticola subsp. mesogeotica K.D.Hill & L.A.S.Johnson that has larger, more rounded adult leaves and larger fruit with longer pedicels than the autonym. The epithet is from ancient Greek meaning "inland", referring to the distribution of this subspecies.

== Distribution and habitat ==
Subspecies deserticola grows in arid, stony or sandy sites, sometimes on mountaintops, and occurs from Mount Augustus and the Hamersley Range in Western Australia to Tennant Creek and the Barkly Tableland in the Northern Territory. Subspecies mesogeotica grows in red sand, has a more inland distribution and occurs from the Gibson Desert to the Barkly Tableland.

== Conservation status ==
Both subspecies of C. deserticola are classified as "not threatened" by the Western Australian Government Department of Parks and Wildlife.

== See also ==
- List of Corymbia species
