= Mulga apple =

Apple of the Aboriginal Eyes in Australia

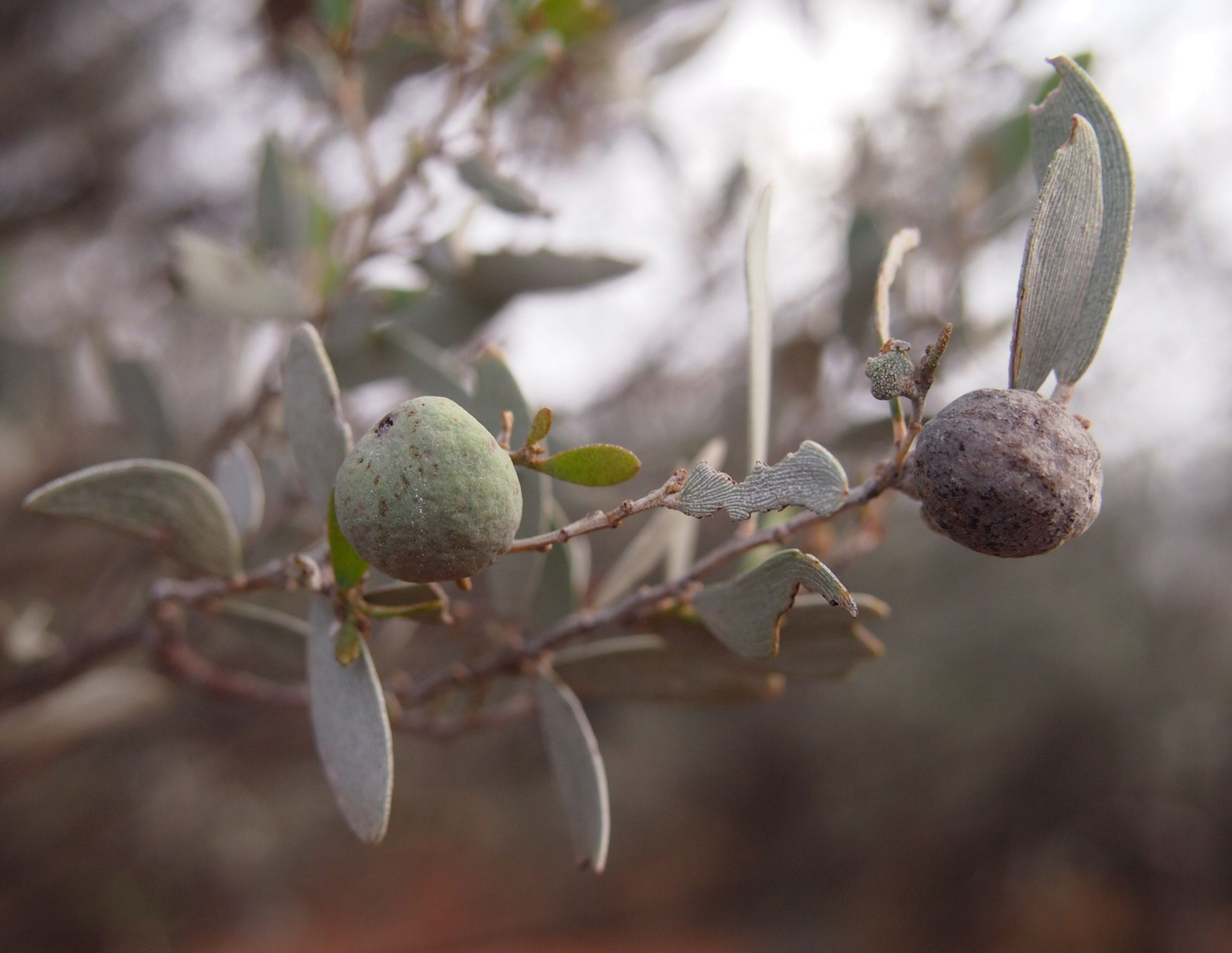
Mulga apples

The mulga apple is an Australian bush tucker food, often eaten by the Indigenous Australians of Central Australia.

The mulga apple is in fact a combination of plant and animal; the insect gall grows inside the wood of the mulga tree (Acacia aneura). Without the wasp the gall would not be induced.

Mulga apple is known as Merne ataltyakwerle in the Arrernte language of Central Australia. Mulga trees grow in flat country and at the foot of hills.

It grows on the end of the mulga branches. Aboriginal Australians eat them raw or cook them in hot earth. The wasp larvae are also eaten. The taste is said to be sweet and like apples.

== See also ==
- Bush coconut
