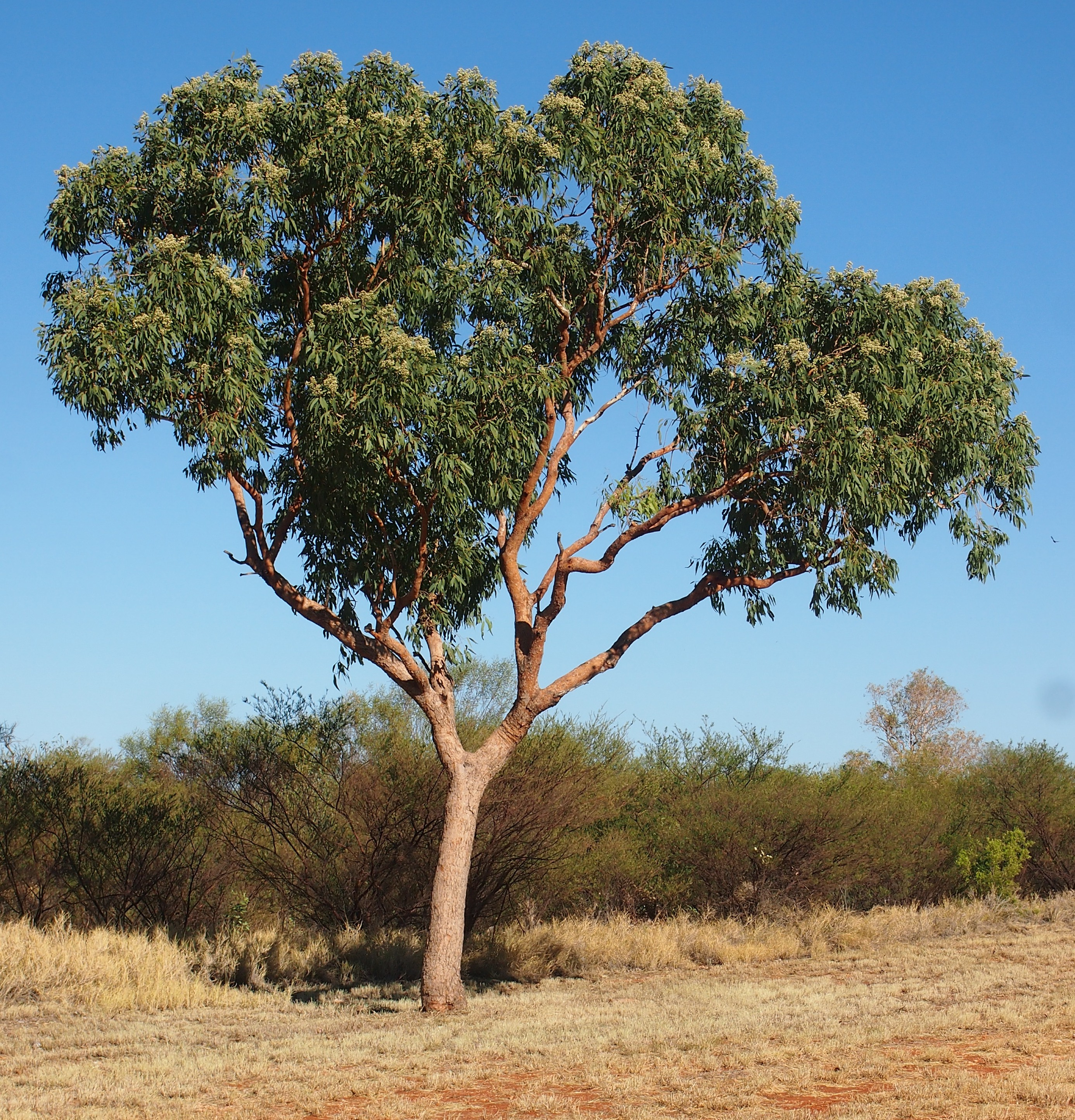

Scientific classification
- Kingdom: Plantae
- Clade: Tracheophytes
- Clade: Angiosperms
- Clade: Eudicots
- Clade: Rosids
- Order: Myrtales
- Family: Myrtaceae
- Genus: Corymbia
- Species: C. terminalis

Binomial name
- Corymbia terminalis (F.Muell.) K.D.Hill & L.A.S.Johnson
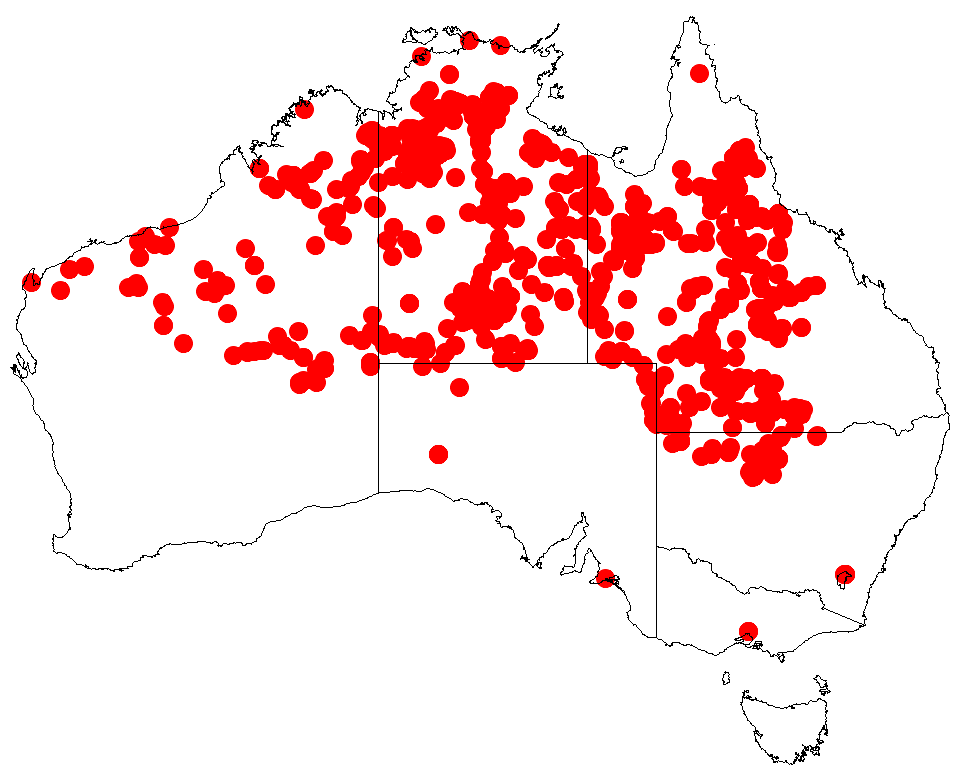
- Occurrence data from Australasian Virtual Herbarium (including that of C. opaca

Synonyms
- Corymbia tumescensK.D.Hill & L.A.S.Johnson; Eucalyptus pyrophoraBenth.; Eucalyptus pyrophoraBenth. f. pyrophora; Eucalyptus pyrophoraBenth. var. pyrophora; Eucalyptus terminalisF.Muell.; Eucalyptus centralisauct. non D.J.Carr & S.G.M.Carr: Robson, Peter J.; Eucalyptus polycarpaauct. non F.Muell.: Blakely, W.F.; Eucalyptus pyrophora var. polycarpaauct. non (F.Muell.) Maiden: Maiden, J.H.

= Corymbia terminalis =

Tjuta

Species of plant

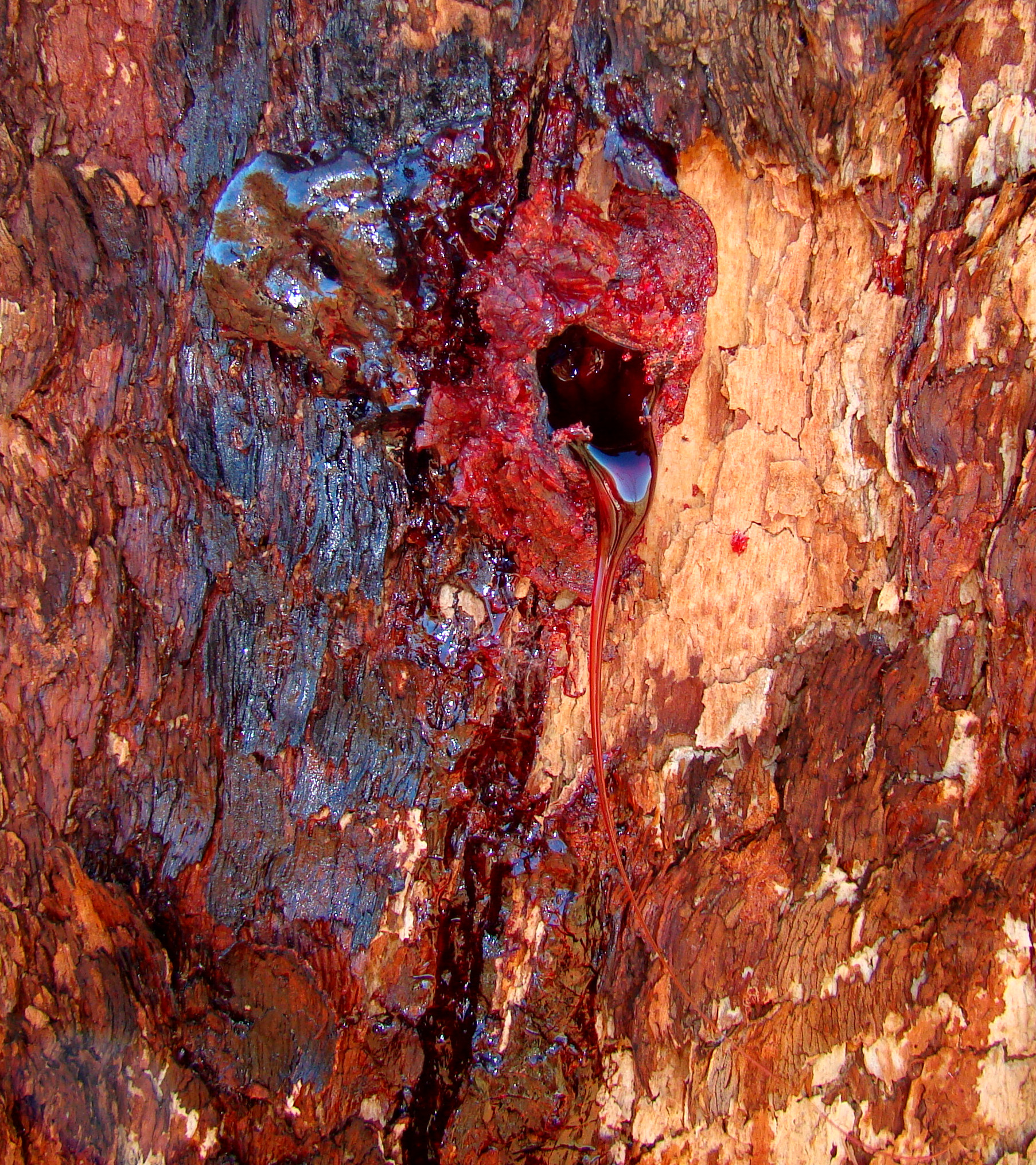
Bloodwood bleeding

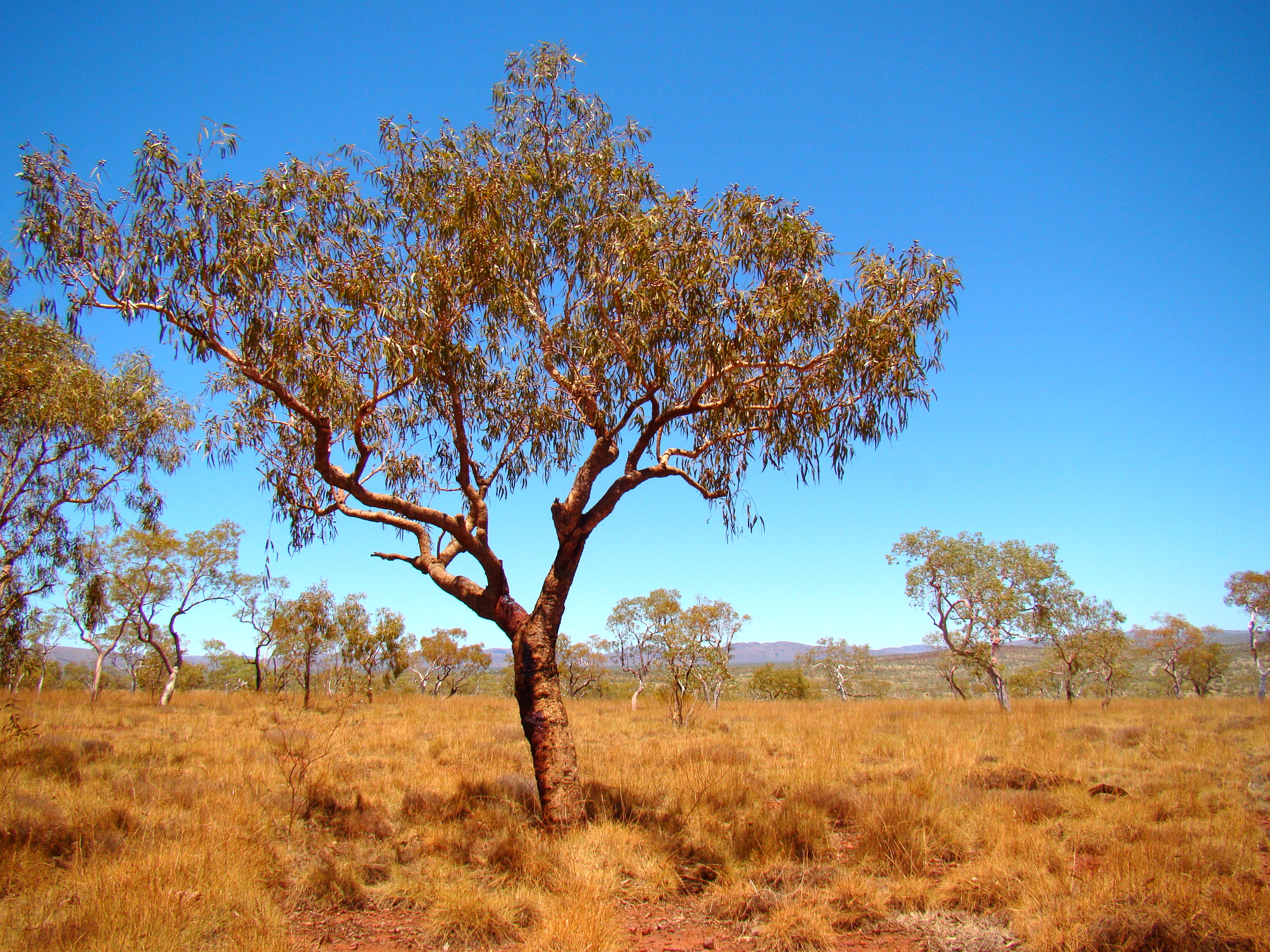
Bloodwood tree in Karijini National Park

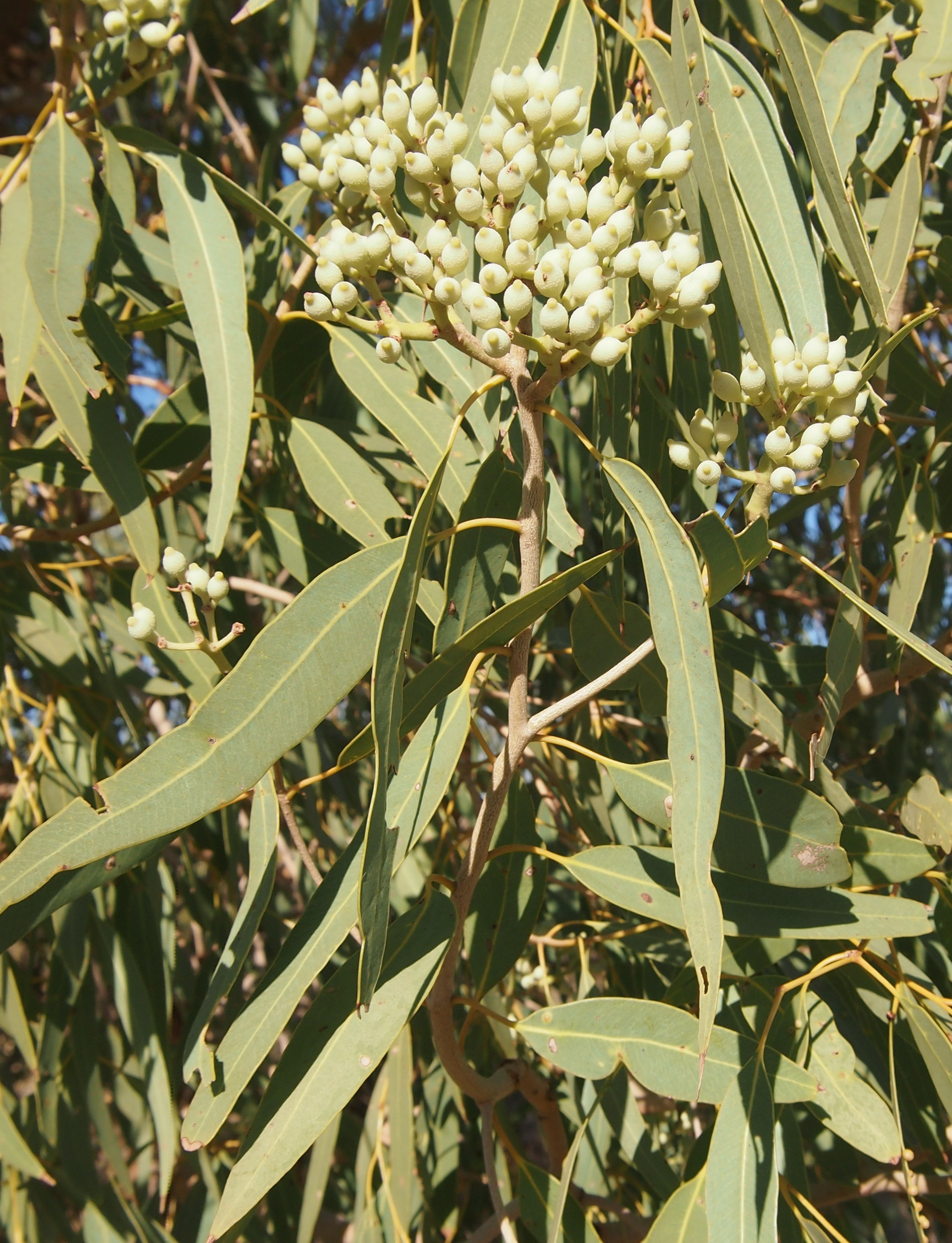
Corymbia terminalis foliage and buds

Corymbia terminalis, also known as tjuta, joolta, bloodwood, desert bloodwood, plains bloodwood, northern bloodwood, western bloodwood or inland bloodwood, is a species of small to medium-sized tree, rarely a mallee that is endemic to Australia. It has rough, tessellated bark on some or all of the trunk, sometimes also on the larger branches, smooth white to cream-coloured bark above, lance-shaped adult leaves, flower buds in groups of seven, white flowers and urn-shaped fruit.

== Description ==
Corymbia terminalis is a tree that typically grows to a height of 18 metres (59 ft), rarely a mallee, and forms a lignotuber. It has rough, tessellated light brown to light grey bark on part or all of the trunk, sometimes extending to the larger branches. Young plants and coppice regrowth have egg-shaped to elliptical or lance-shaped leaves that are 60–170 mm (2.4–6.7 in) long, 12–45 mm (0.47–1.77 in) wide, tapering to a petiole and arranged in opposite pairs. Adult leaves are arranged alternately, the same shade of grey-green on both sides, lance-shaped, 80–200 mm (3.1–7.9 in) long and 12–30 mm (0.47–1.18 in) wide on a petiole 10–30 mm (0.39–1.18 in) long.

The flower buds are arranged on the ends of branchlets on a branched peduncle 5–20 mm (0.20–0.79 in) long, each branch of the peduncle with seven buds on pedicels 2–13 mm (0.079–0.512 in) long. Mature buds are scurfy, oval to pear-shaped, greenish to brown or cream-coloured, 6–14 mm (0.24–0.55 in) long, 5–10 mm (0.20–0.39 in) wide with a conical, rounded or flattened operculum. Flowering occurs between March and October and the flowers are white. The fruit is a woody urn-shaped capsule 15–31 mm (0.59–1.22 in) long and 12–22 mm (0.47–0.87 in) wide on a pedicel 2–12 mm (0.079–0.472 in) long and with the valves enclosed in the fruit. The seeds are light brown or reddish brown, 9–12 mm (0.35–0.47 in) long with a wing on the end.

== Taxonomy and naming ==
Tjuta was first formally described in 1859 by Ferdinand von Mueller and given the name Eucalyptus terminalis. The description was published in the Journal of the Proceedings of the Linnean Society, Botany from samples collected from Arnhem Land in the Northern Territory in 1856. In 1995, Ken Hill and Lawrie Johnson changed the name to Corymbia terminalis, publishing the change in the journal Telopea.

In the same paper, Hill and John described C. terminalis, C. opaca and C. tumescens as distinct species with intergrades between them. The Australian Plant Census regards C. tumescens as a synonym but it is considered by the National Herbarium of New South Wales to be distinct.

The specific epithet is derived from the Latin word terminalis meaning terminal in reference to the placement of the inflorescences on the branchlets outside the crown.

== Distribution and habitat ==
This eucalypt occurs in arid and seasonally dry areas of the Northern Territory, Queensland, the north-west of New South Wales and the extreme north of South Australia. Corymbia opaca, sometimes included in C. terminalis, is found in the northern half of Western Australia. The tree typically grows on river flats, scree slopes and dune swales. It prefers well drained soils and is both drought and frost tolerant.

== Ecology ==
The flowers of Corymbia terminalis produce drops of nectar which provide a high energy food source for many desert animals including honeyeaters, insects and possums.

It is also host to an unusual female insect called a coccid. Once the coccid burrows into the bark it forms a gall which it never leaves. Hidden away it sucks sap from the trees veins. The gall that grows on the tree is called the coconut. It must be broken open; the insect on the inside can be eaten, and contains a lot of moisture and a disinfectant.

== Indigenous uses ==
Indigenous Australians used the tree for traditional medicine. The exudate from the trunk or branches was diluted and used as an antiseptic treatment of facial cuts and sores. Larger leaves were useful for staunching wounds.

The red bark kino can be stripped from the tree and mixed in water, then consumed for diarrhoea as well as for indigestion and chest pain.

The wood from the tree was used by indigenous peoples to make spear-throwers, digging bowls and carrying vessels. Europeans used the wood to make fence-posts, joists slabs and buildings as well as using it for firewood.

== See also ==
- List of Corymbia species
