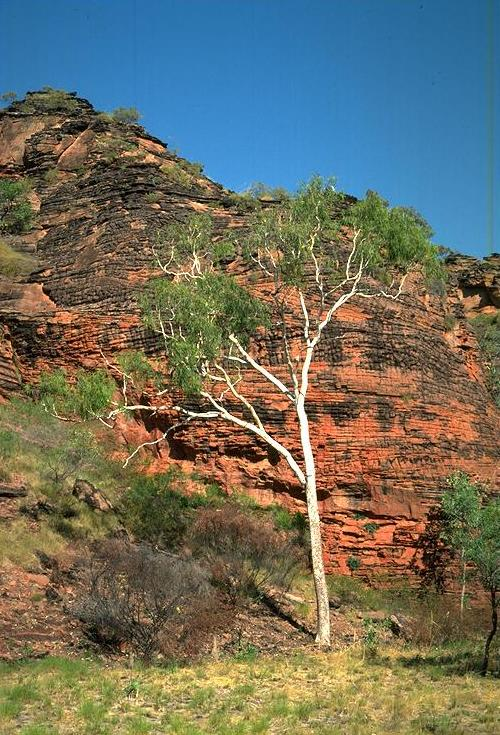
- Corymbia dichromophloia near Kununurra

Scientific classification
- Kingdom: Plantae
- Clade: Tracheophytes
- Clade: Angiosperms
- Clade: Eudicots
- Clade: Rosids
- Order: Myrtales
- Family: Myrtaceae
- Genus: Corymbia
- Species: C. dichromophloia

Binomial name
- Corymbia dichromophloia (F.Muell.) K.D.Hill & L.A.S.Johnson

Synonyms
- Synonyms: Corymbia capricornia (D.J.Carr & S.G.M.Carr) K.D.Hill & L.A.S.Johnson; Corymbia drysdalensis (D.J.Carr & S.G.M.Carr) K.D.Hill & L.A.S.Johnson; Corymbia rubens K.D.Hill & L.A.S.Johnson; Eucalyptus atrovirens Brooker & Kleinig; Eucalyptus capricornia D.J.Carr & S.G.M.Carr; Eucalyptus coniophloia D.J.Carr & S.G.M.Carr; Eucalyptus dichromophloia F.Muell.; Eucalyptus drysdalensis D.J.Carr & S.G.M.Carr; Eucalyptus niphophloia Blakely & Jacobs

= Corymbia dichromophloia =

Small-fruited bloodwood

Species of plant

Corymbia dichromophloia, commonly known as small-fruited bloodwood, variably-barked bloodwood or gum-topped bloodwood, is a species of tree that is endemic to northern Australia. It has smooth white bark sometimes with flaky bark on the trunk, lance-shaped adult leaves, flower buds usually in groups of seven, creamy white flowers and urn-shaped fruit.

== Description ==
Corymbia dichromophloia is a tree that typically grows to a height of 12–15 m (39–49 ft) and forms a lignotuber. It has smooth white, sometimes powdery bark, sometimes with thin, unshed orange and brownish flakes on the trunk and upper branches. Young plants and coppice regrowth have egg-shaped to broadly lance-shaped or elliptical leaves that are 95–220 mm (3.7–8.7 in) long and 55–100 mm (2.2–3.9 in) wide and petiolate. Adult leaves are arranged alternately, the same shade of dull or slightly glossy green on both sides, lance-shaped or curved, 70–230 mm (2.8–9.1 in) long and 8–55 mm (0.31–2.17 in) wide, tapering at the base to a petiole 9–34 mm (0.35–1.34 in) long. The flower buds are arranged on the ends of branchlets on a branched peduncle 1–17 mm (0.039–0.669 in) long, each branch of the peduncle with seven, sometimes nine or eleven buds on pedicels 1–11 mm (0.039–0.433 in) long. Mature buds are oval, pear-shaped or spherical, 4–7 mm (0.16–0.28 in) long and 3–5 mm (0.12–0.20 in) wide with a rounded operculum. Flowering occurs between February and May and the flowers are creamy white. The fruit is a woody, urn-shaped capsule 8–13 mm (0.31–0.51 in) long and 6–11 mm (0.24–0.43 in) wide with a descending disc and the valves enclosed in the fruit. The seeds are reddish brown and boat-shaped with a wing on the end.

== Taxonomy and naming ==
This eucalypt was first formally described in 1859 by Ferdinand von Mueller who gave it the name Eucalyptus dichromophloia and published the description in Journal of the Proceedings of the Linnean Society, Botany. In 1995 Ken Hill and Lawrie Johnson changed the name to Corymbia dichromophloia.

There is debate about the status of this species and differing taxonomies have been proposed. Corymbia capricornia, C. drysdalensis and C. rubens have been described, but even then there is hybridisation and intergradation between these and other species of Corymbia.

== Distribution and habitat ==
Corymbia dichromophloia grows in woodland on hills, ridges, plains and near river banks on red or yellow sandy soils over granite or sandstone. It is found in Western Australia, including in the Kimberley region and Wunaamin Miliwundi Ranges, in the Top End and south to Katherine in the Northern Territory, and near Mount Isa, Cloncurry and Normanton in Queensland.

== See also ==
- List of Corymbia species
