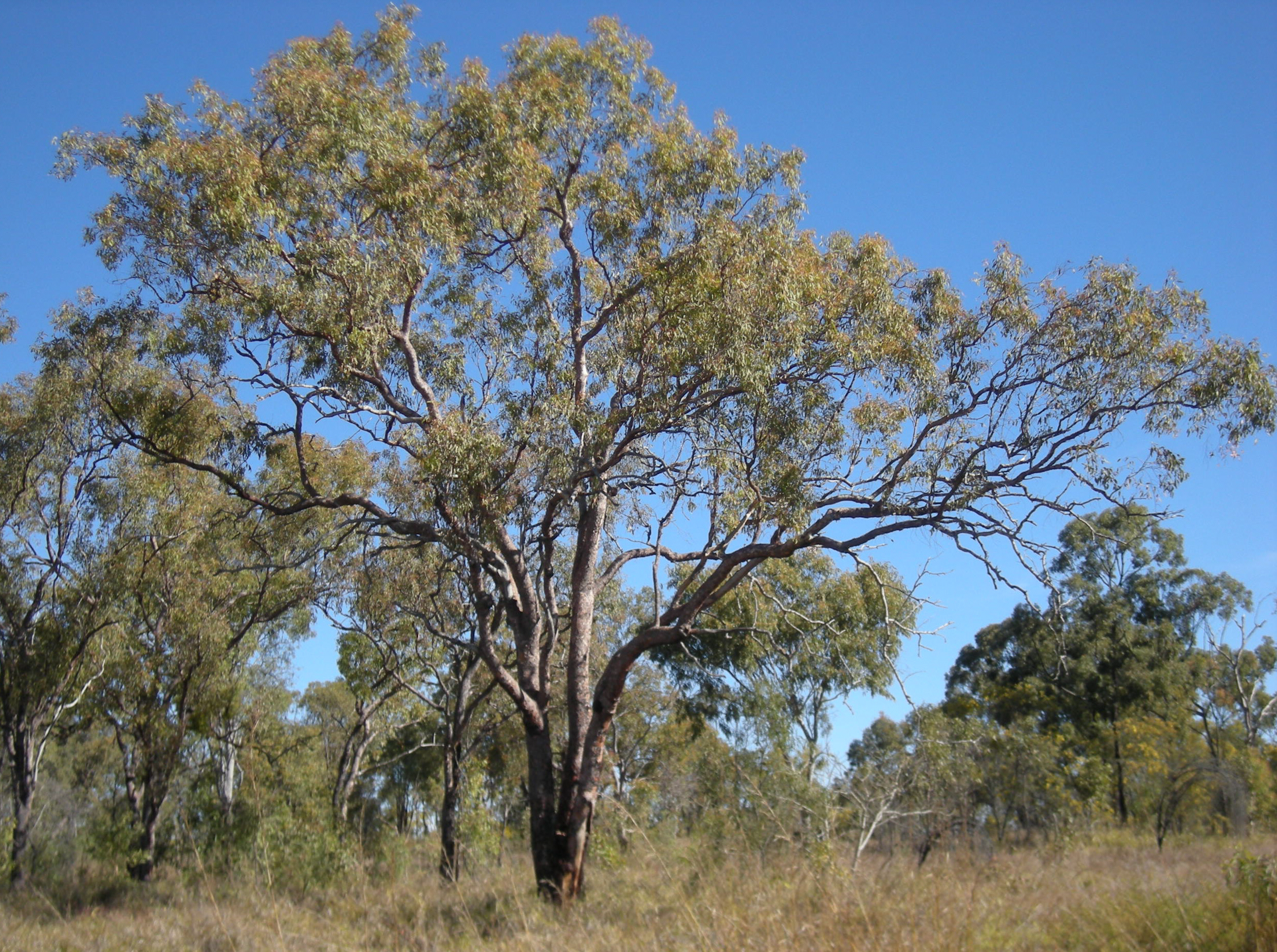

Scientific classification
- Kingdom: Plantae
- Clade: Embryophytes
- Clade: Tracheophytes
- Clade: Spermatophytes
- Clade: Angiosperms
- Clade: Eudicots
- Clade: Rosids
- Order: Myrtales
- Family: Myrtaceae
- Genus: Corymbia
- Species: C. erythrophloia

Binomial name
- Corymbia erythrophloia (Blakely) K.D.Hill & L.A.S.Johnson

Synonyms
- Eucalyptus erythrophloia Blakely

= Corymbia erythrophloia =

Red bloodwood

Species of plant

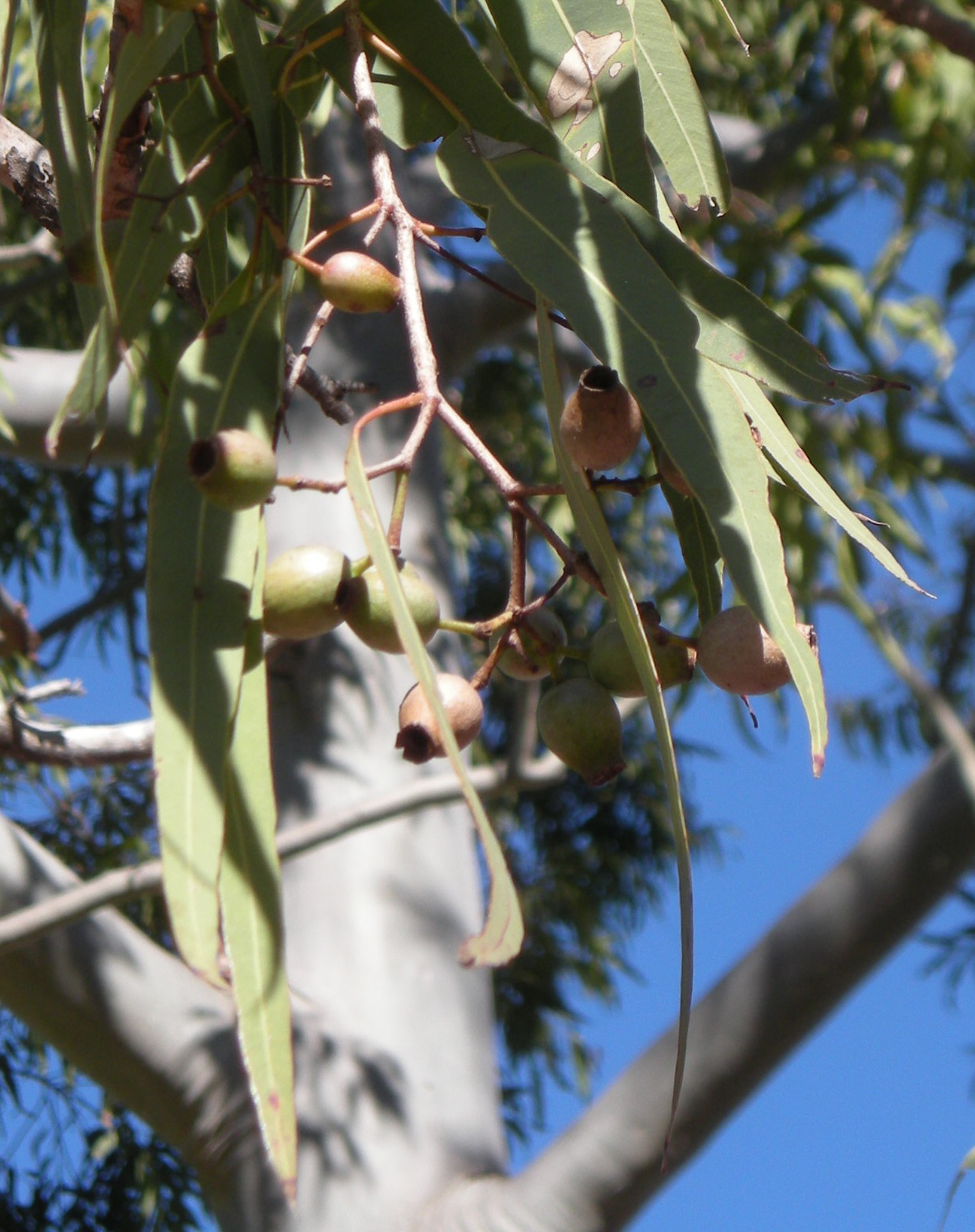
Fruiting capsules

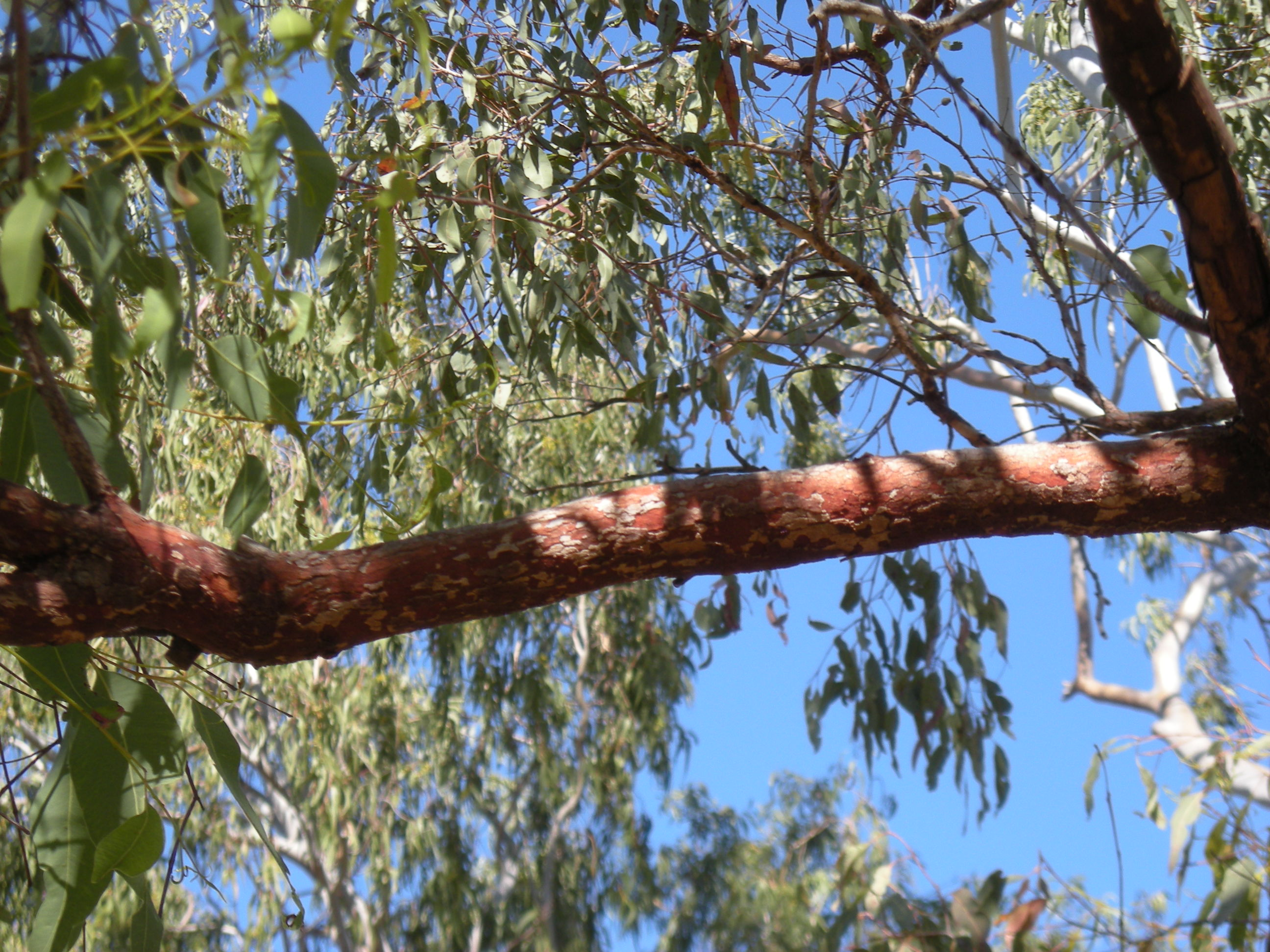
Bark

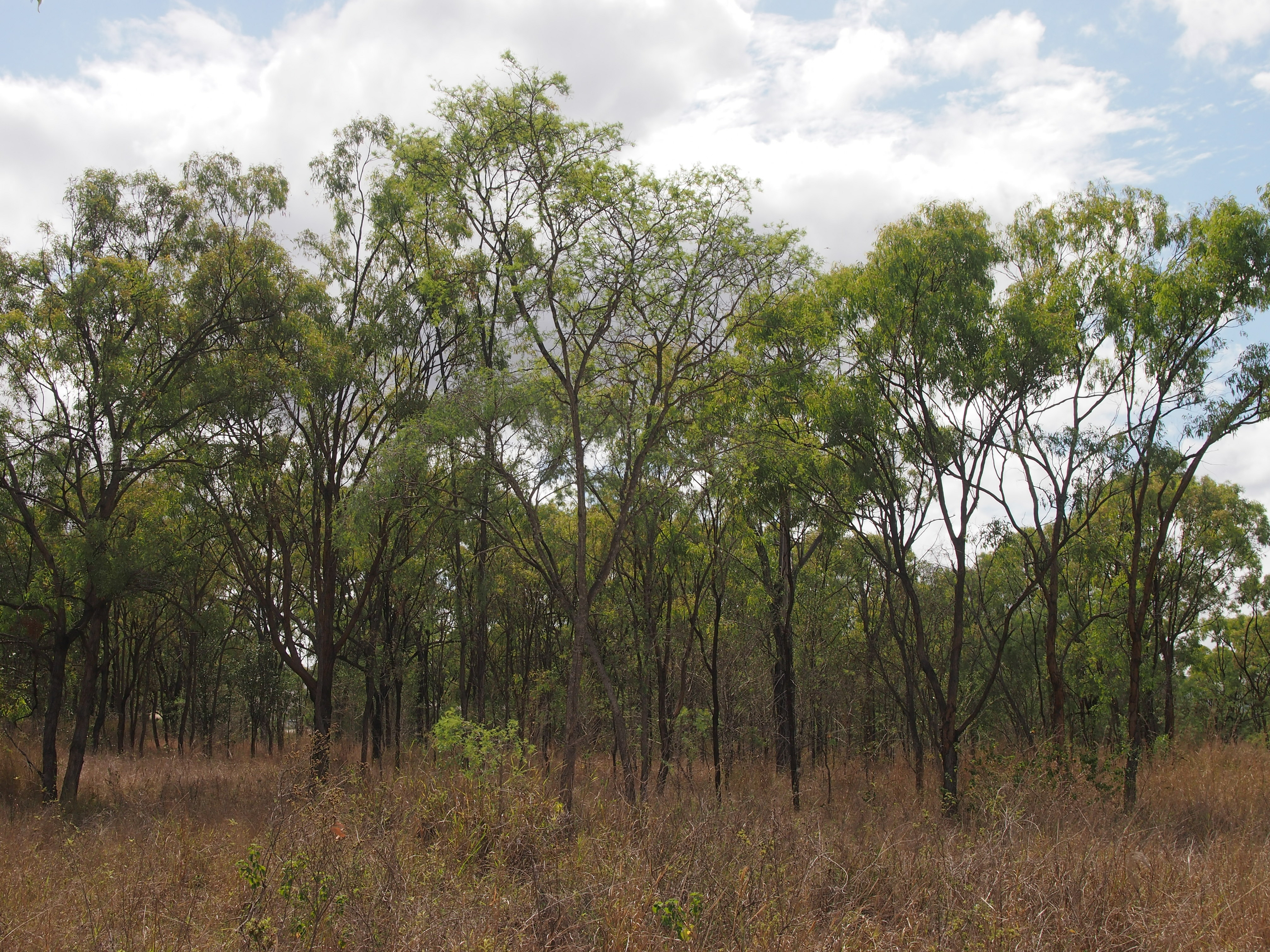
Savannah woodland with C. erythrophloia, Eucalyptus crebra and Vachellia bidwillii

Corymbia erythrophloia, commonly known as red bloodwood, variable-barked bloodwood, red-barked bloodwood or gum-topped bloodwood, is a species of tree that is endemic to Queensland. It has rough bark on the trunk and branches, egg-shaped or lance-shaped adult leaves, flower buds in groups of seven, creamy white flowers and urn-shaped to spherical fruit.

== Description ==
The tree typically grows to a height of 15 metres (49 ft) with tessellated, red-brown, dull, grey or pink bark that is persistent on the trunk and lower branches. The bark sheds in small polygonal flakes giving the tree a mottled appearance. Young plants and coppice regrowth have elliptical to egg-shaped, later lance-shaped leaves that are 55–125 mm (2.2–4.9 in) long and 20–55 mm (0.79–2.17 in) wide and petiolate. Adult leaves are arranged alternately, more or less the same shade of dull grey-green on both sides, lance-shaped to broadly lance-shaped or curved, 90–236 mm (3.5–9.3 in) long and 20–35 mm (0.79–1.38 in) wide, tapering at the base to a narrowly flattened petiole 9–28 mm (0.35–1.10 in) long.

The flower buds are arranged on the ends of branchlets on a branched peduncle 4–21 mm (0.16–0.83 in) long, each branch of the peduncle with seven buds on thin pedicels 3–10 mm (0.12–0.39 in) long. Mature buds are oval or pear-shaped, 6–10 mm (0.24–0.39 in) long and 5–7 mm (0.20–0.28 in) wide with a rounded, sometimes pointed operculum. The tree will bloom between January and April and the flowers are creamy white. The fruit is a woody urn-shaped to more or less spherical capsule 11–21 mm (0.43–0.83 in) long and 10–16 mm (0.39–0.63 in) wide. The seeds are boat-shaped or oval and reddish brown with a wing on the end.

== Taxonomy and naming ==
The first formal description of this species was by William Blakely in 1934 who published the description in his book A Key to the Eucalypts and gave it the name Eucalyptus erythrophloia. The type specimens were collected by Thomas Lane Bancroft (1860–1933) near Eidsvold in 1919. In 1995, botanists Ken Hill and Lawrie Johnson defined the genus Corymbia, identifying the bloodwoods, ghost gums and spotted gums as a group distinct from Eucalyptus and they changed the name Eucalyptus erythrophloia to Corymbia erythrophloia.

== Distribution and habitat ==
Corymbia erythrophloia is found down the east coast of Queensland as far north as Queenstown on the Cape York Peninsula where it is found as far west as the Gulf of Carpentaria. The range then extends as far south as the Hervey Bay with an isolated population found further south to the west of Brisbane. It is found on grassy woodlands or low rolling hills containing clayey or stony soils mostly of volcanic origin. It is often found in association with mountain coolibah or the silver-leaved ironbark.

== Conservation status ==
This eucalypt is classified as of "least concern" under the Queensland Government Nature Conservation Act 1992.

== Use in horticulture ==
The tree can be grown as a shade tree that is a bird attractor in gardens where it can tolerate a hot overhead sun and dry soils. Soils can be ordinary or enriched, containing clay and mildly acidic to mildly alkaline. Trees are pruned to retain one main trunk sometimes are allowed multiple trunks which are well-spaced to develop.

== See also ==
- List of Corymbia species
