= Maisie Carr =

Australian ecologist

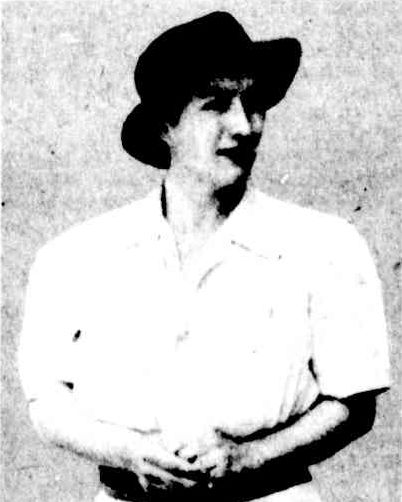
- Maisie Carr (née Fawcett), 1944
- Born: 26 February 1912; Footscray, Victoria
- Died: 9 September 1988 (aged 76); Canberra
- Resting place: Gungahlin Cemetery
- Education: University of Melbourne
- Spouse: Denis John Carr
- Scientific career
- Fields: Botany, ecology
- Workplaces: University of Melbourne

Maisie Carr (née Fawcett; 1912–1988) was an Australian ecologist and botanist who contributed much to the understanding of the uniqueness of Australian plants and their environmental systems.

== Foundation years ==
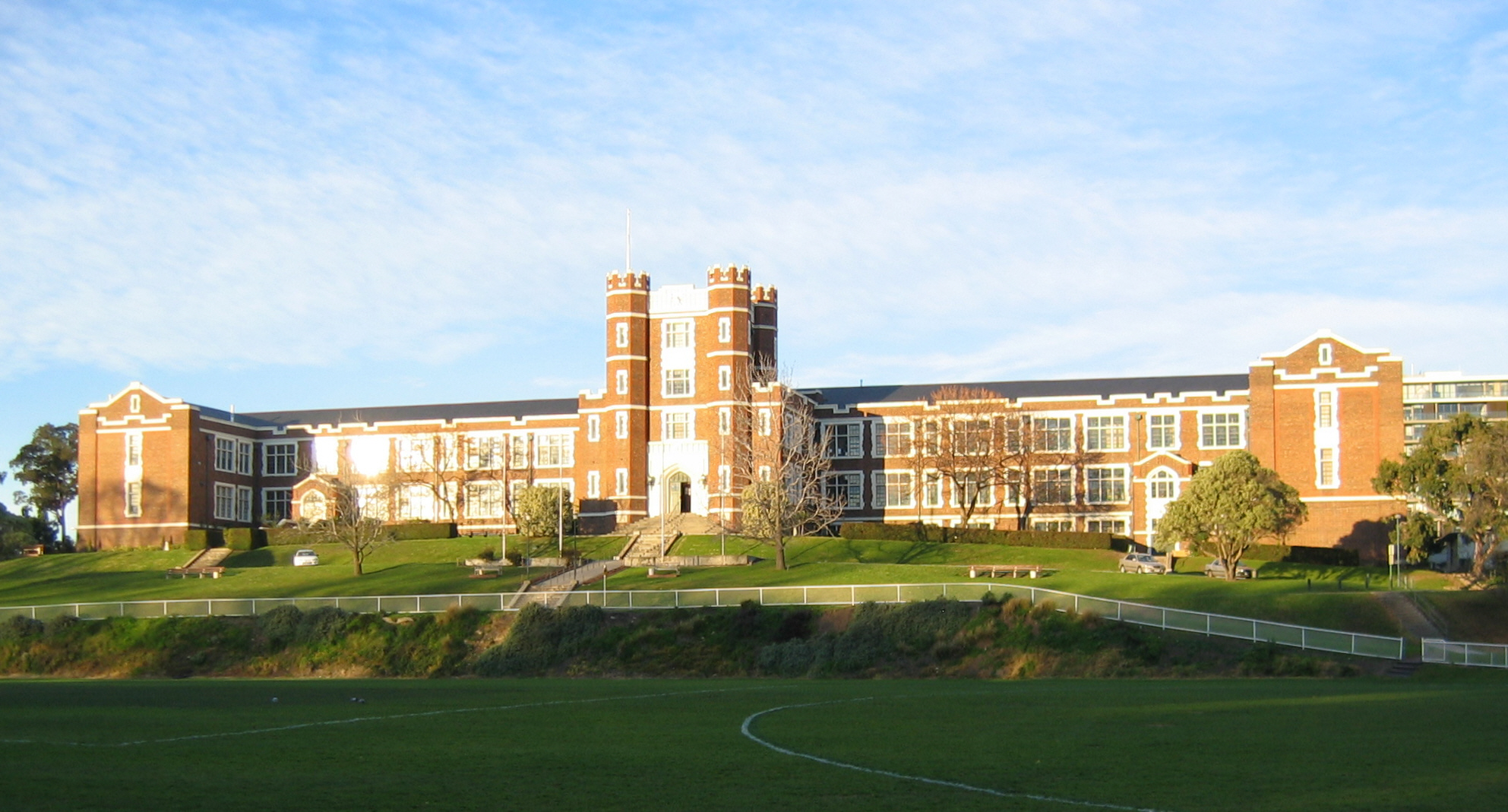
Melbourne High School, 2006

Maisie Carr was born Stella Grace Maisie Fawcett in Footscray, Melbourne. Neither of her parents had a science background but her love of plants was likely fostered by visits to nearby salt-marshes, her grandmother's garden and in nature study classes.

Carr attended Footscray's Hyde Street State School where she was first in her class and Dux in 1924 and then attended Melbourne High School. Her diligence was evident at an early age; in 1920 she won £2 in a competition for finding the largest number (87) of Australian postal towns within the letters of AUSTRALBA TOOTH PASTE (the sponsor of the competition).

After graduation she returned to her old primary school as a junior teacher while at night studying zoology and geology at Austral Coaching College. Carr attended University of Melbourne (on a Teachers' College secondary studentship) being awarded B.Sc., 1935 and M.Sc. in Botany, 1936.

Carr's academic abilities won her a number of scholarships. In March 1935, she was awarded the Howitt natural history scholarship, established from a bequest of entomologist Godfrey Howitt.

In December 1936, Carr was awarded the Wyselaskie Scholarship, established by John Dickson Wyselaskie in 1883.

In April 1937, Carr was awarded the Caroline Kay scholarship in Botany; the scholarship was established by the Reverend David Kay in memory of his daughter Caroline.

== Major research interests ==
=== Ecology of Australian Alps ===
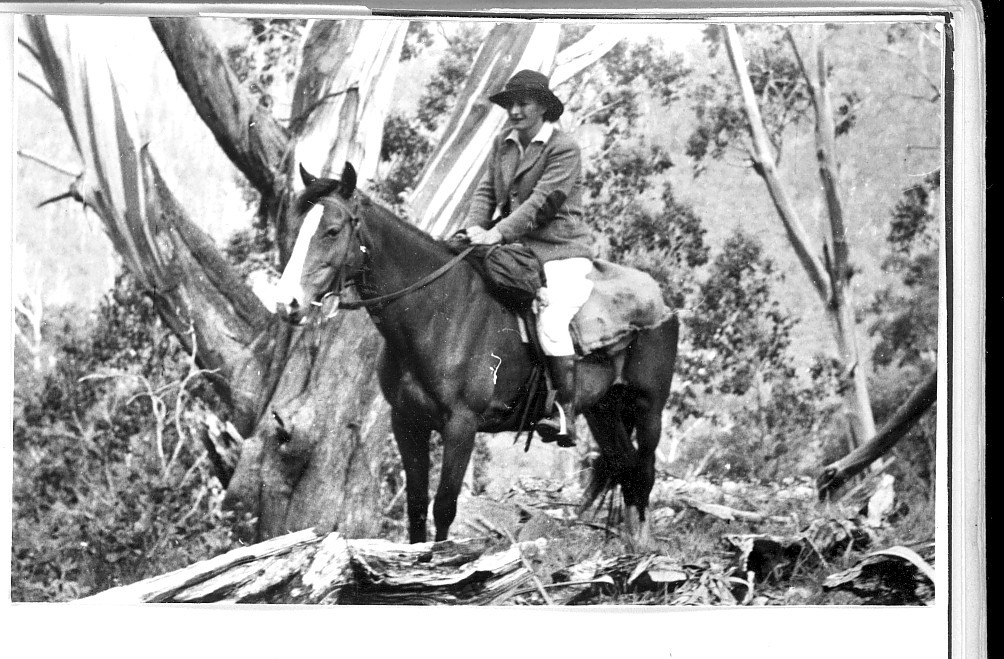
Maisie Carr on her horse "Sheila", Bogong High Plains, 1949

Although her initial research activities focused on coral fungi, she studied fungal and nematode diseases of plants as well. As a student, attending field-trips with the McCoy Society for Field Investigation and Research proved to be a harbinger for decades of her subsequent professional life. In 1936, Carr participated in one of the society's expeditions to Sir Joseph Banks Islands in the Spencer Gulf of South Australia to undertake a full scientific survey of the islands.

In 1940, Carr was appointed the secretary of the committee to award the Isabella D. Marshall scholarship to enable a female student to live away from home in order to study at the University of Melbourne. Marshall was the mistress of method of English in the School of Education at the University of Melbourne until her death in 1938. Marshalls friends raised £500 to fund the scholarship.

From 1941 onward, Carr conducted extensive innovative ecology research in the Australian alpine environment where extensive over-grazing by cattle and sheep was causing soil erosion and degradation of a delicate ecosystem. Permits to graze these high plains commenced in the late 1880s and the changes wrought by the hooved animals facilitated the arrival (in 1920s) of rabbits which caused further change.

Additional motivation for the studies was prompted by the soil siltation threat to the soon to be constructed Kiewa Hydroelectric Scheme. Carr was the first research officer of the Soil Conservation Board and was responsible for establishing exclusion fencing on reference plots in Bogong High Plains. Having excluded grazing from select high-plains plots (and not from adjacent plots), Carr and team members recorded changes in regrowth vegetation (both type and density) over decades.

In the early years, Carr surveyed these plots via horseback on her own but over subsequent years with teams of participants (from department of botany, University of Melbourne), these plots have become the longest continuous series of ecological data-sites in Australia. In 2022 "Maisie's plots" were added to the Victorian Heritage Register.

=== Chronology of alpine ecology events ===
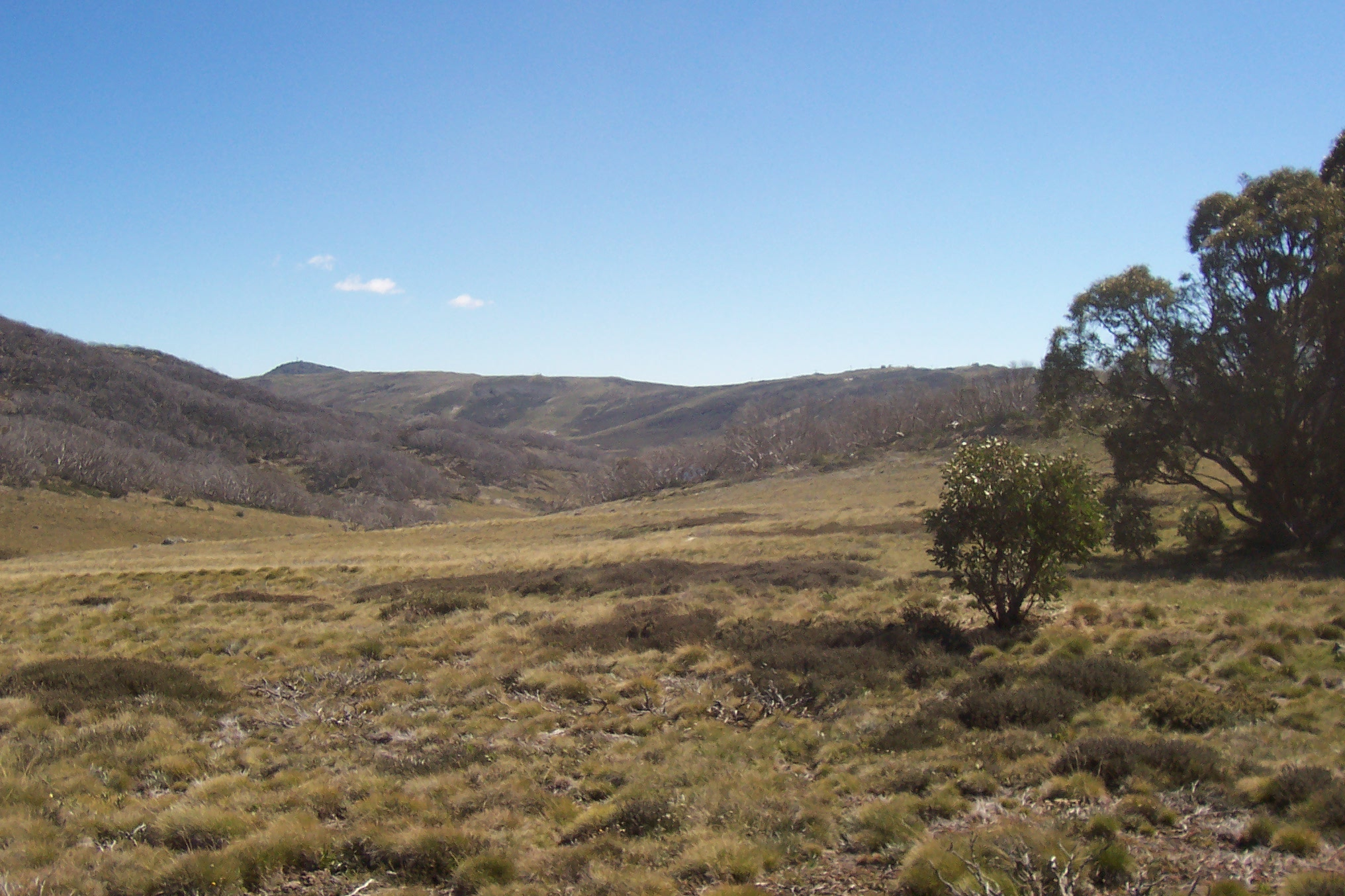
Bogong high plains in summer

The sequence of significant events in alpine ecology and Maisie Carr's role is detailed below:

- 1944: Soil Conservation Board established – Maisie Carr Research Officer
- 1945: Establishment of exclusion plots in Rocky Valley
- 1946: Establishment of exclusion plots in Pretty Valley
- 1947: Publication of Report on the Ecology of Hume Catchment
- 1966: One of Carr's final High Plains expeditions
- 1968: Grazing gradually withdrawn from Kosciuszko National Park
- 1991: Grazing phased out to 20% of Bogong High Plains
- 2005: Grazing banned from Victorian Alpine National Park

=== Eucalypt taxonomy ===
While initiating foundation alpine ecology studies, Carr became frustrated with the inadequacy of published floras and responded by preparing a botanical key. This has evolved into a teaching collection of 100-200 plant specimens from that region of north-east Victoria which is still in use for teaching and research field work purposes today.

Much of this early taxonomy work was undertaken while she was employed at University of Melbourne (beginning in 1949) in the Botany Department headed at the time by Prof. J. S. Turner. In addition to her research interests, she lectured on plant taxonomy as well as ecology (to science and agricultural students) becoming a senior lecturer in that department three years later.

Together with Professor John Stewart Turner she published academic reports of the results of the exclusion fencing experiments and more broadly the destructive impact of grazing on the ecology (of plant life as well as soil degradation) of the Victorian alpine region.

Carr's interest in the taxonomy of Australian plants (particularly the Genus Eucalyptus) extended beyond the alpine species and this interest was fostered by her marriage (in 1955) to Denis John Carr, who was also an academic in the botany department at University of Melbourne. Their marriage was the start of decades of collaborative efforts studying plant morphology and taxonomy. Their studies continued during academic appointments (of DJ Carr) in Belfast (1960-1967) and later back in Australia (in Canberra, Australian National University from 1968) where Carr was a visiting fellow. Their academic contributions together resulted in dozens of articles, often in highly specialist publications.

The couple was opposed to any splitting of the genus Eucalyptus into smaller groupings. They did, however, make significant contributions to descriptions of the morphology of eucalypts. Published phylogenetic analyses (based on DNA sequences and morphology) would later show that Eucalyptus was not a particularly uniform genus and that the classification needed to be revised. The current definitive electronic identification and information system covering 894 Australian eucalypts is EUCLID.

== Later life ==
Carr was a chain smoker (of cigarettes) and developed chronic bronchitis. She was eventually hospitalized for this (and related conditions); she died on Friday 9 September 1988 in the Royal Canberra Hospital. She was buried in Gungahlin cemetery on Tuesday 13 September 1988. Her husband Denis died on Saturday 19 July 2008 and was buried with Maisie on Monday 28 July 2008.

== Legacy ==
The University of Melbourne has established a set of scholarships, called the Maisie Fawcett Scholarships, in her honour.
