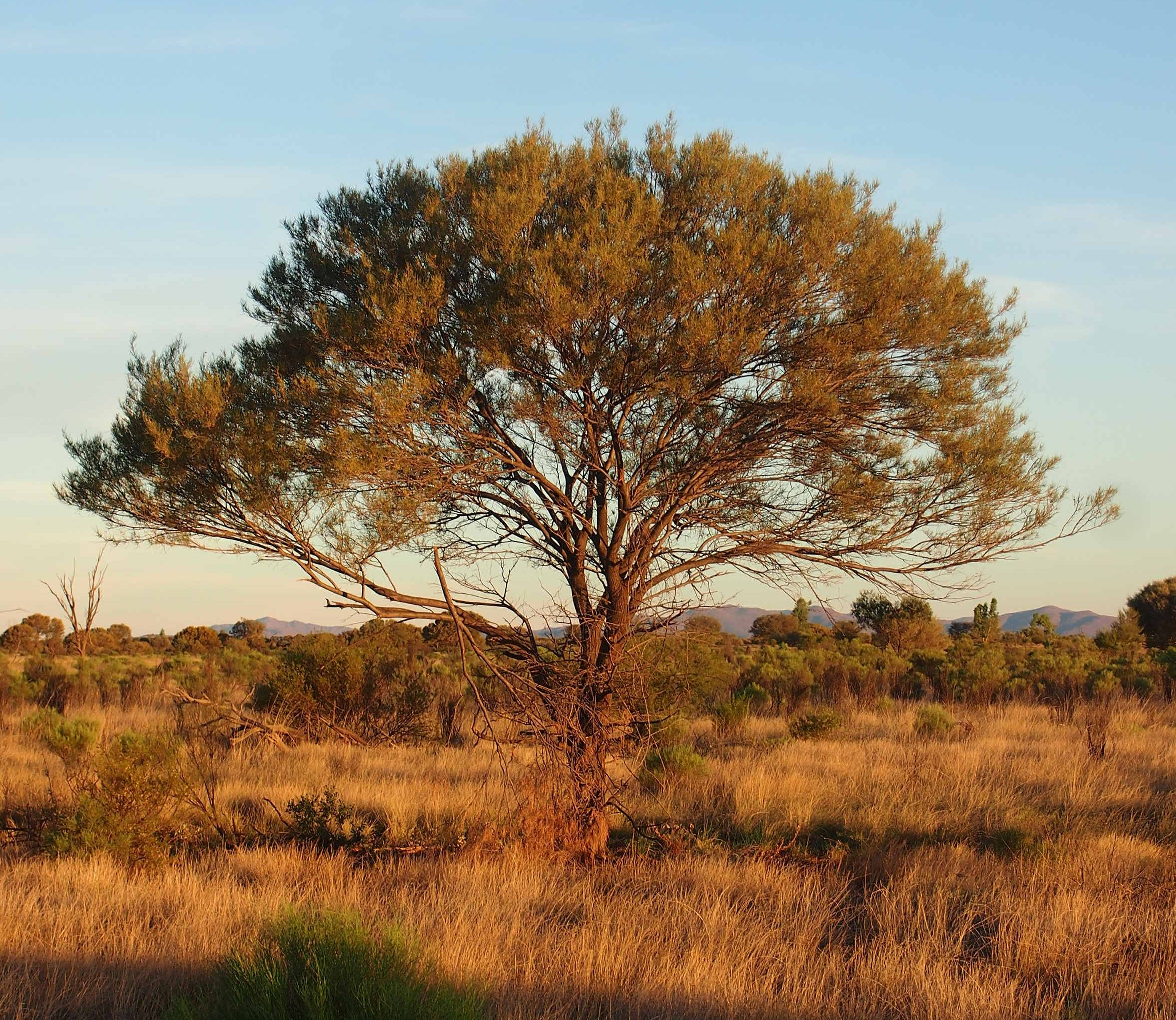

Conservation status
- Least Concern (IUCN 3.1)

Scientific classification
- Kingdom: Plantae
- Clade: Tracheophytes
- Clade: Angiosperms
- Clade: Eudicots
- Clade: Rosids
- Order: Fabales
- Family: Fabaceae
- Subfamily: Caesalpinioideae
- Clade: Mimosoid clade
- Genus: Acacia
- Species: A. aneura

Binomial name
- Acacia aneura F.Muell. ex Benth.

Synonyms
- List: Acacia aneura var. (Napperby S.L.Everist 4226); Acacia aneura var. (Thargomindah D.E.Boyland 8099); Acacia aneura var. intermedia Pedley; Racosperma aneurum (Benth.) Pedley; Racosperma aneurum var. intermedium (Pedley) Pedley; Acacia aneura var. conifera auct. non Randell: Holland, A.E. & Pedley, L. in Henderson, R.J.F. (2002) p.p.; Acacia aneura var. conifera auct. non Randell: Pedley, L. in Bostock, P.D. & Holland, A.E. (ed.) (2007) p.p.; Acacia aneura var. conifera auct. non Randell: Pedley, L. in Bostock, P.D. & Holland, A.E. (ed.) 2010 p.p.

= Acacia aneura =

Mulga

Species of shrub or small tree

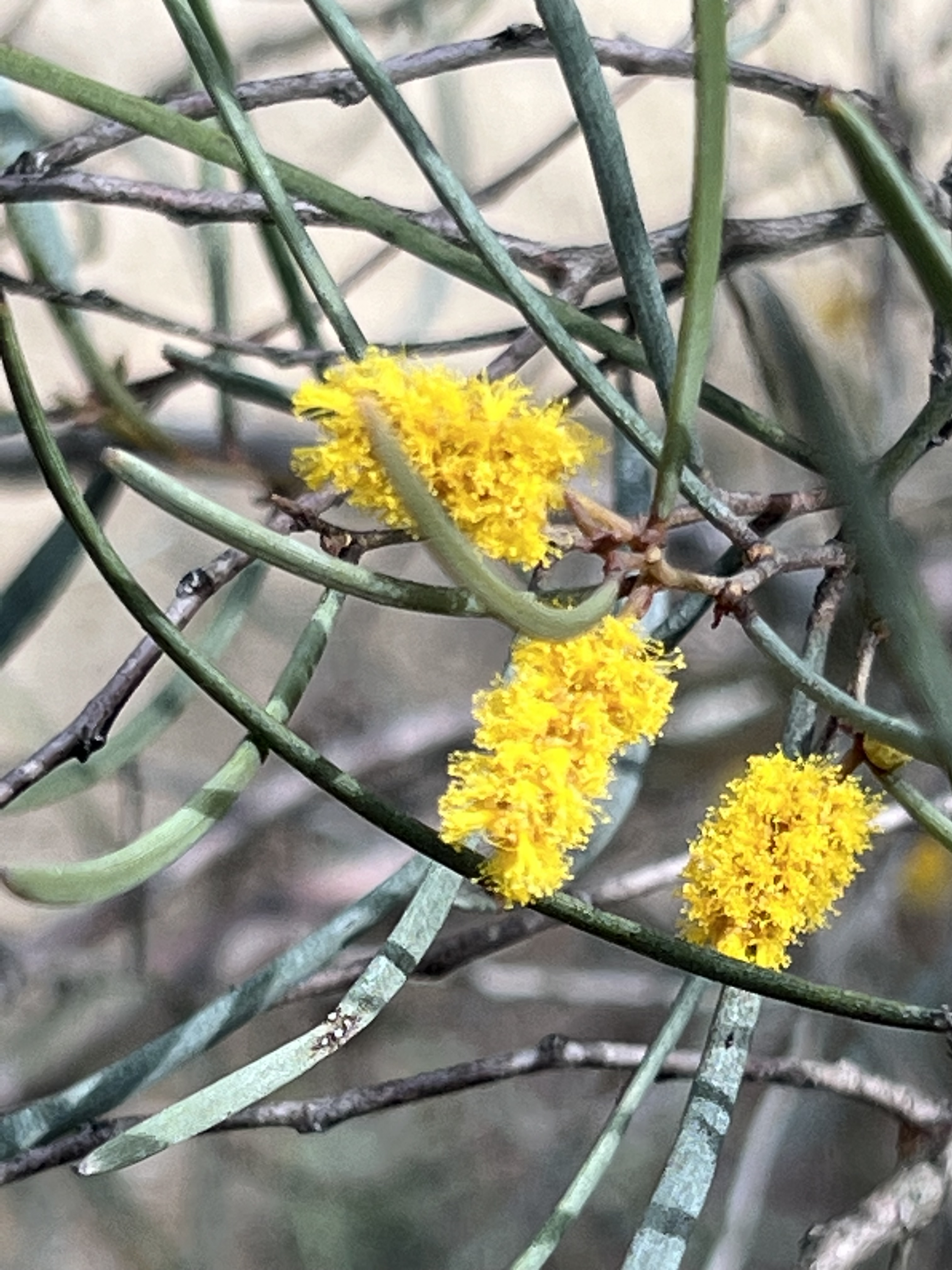
Acacia aneura var. aneura leaves and flowers

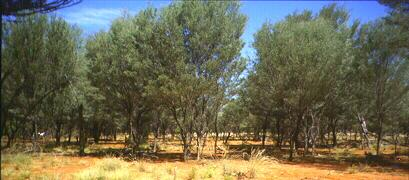
Mulga woodland in Southwestern Queensland

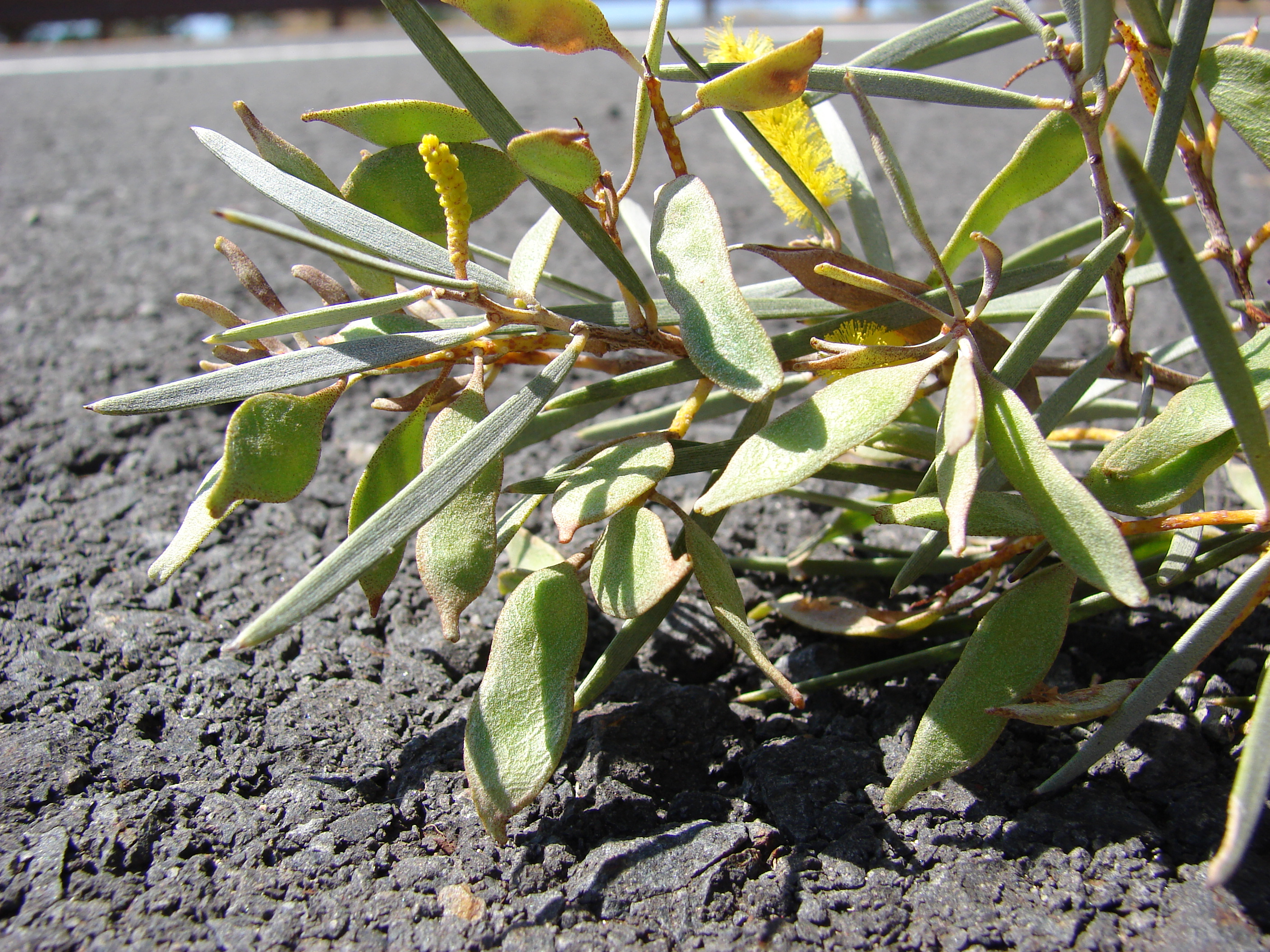
Acacia aneura branch with seed pods

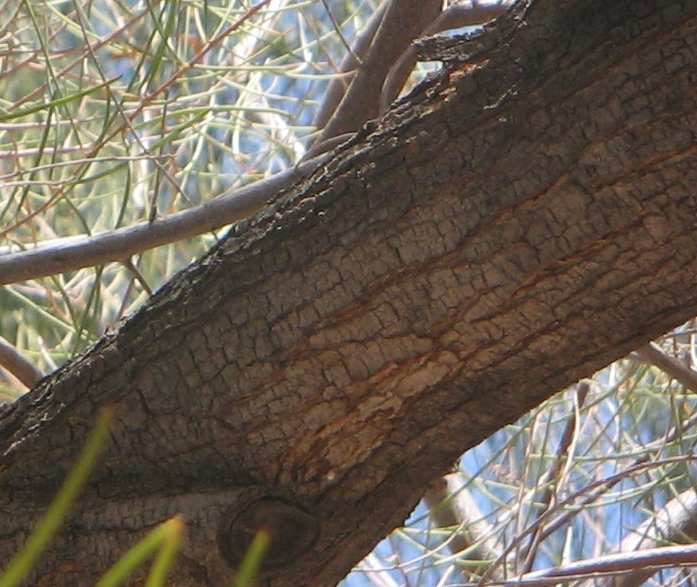
Acacia aneura bark

Mulga heath in Southwestern Queensland

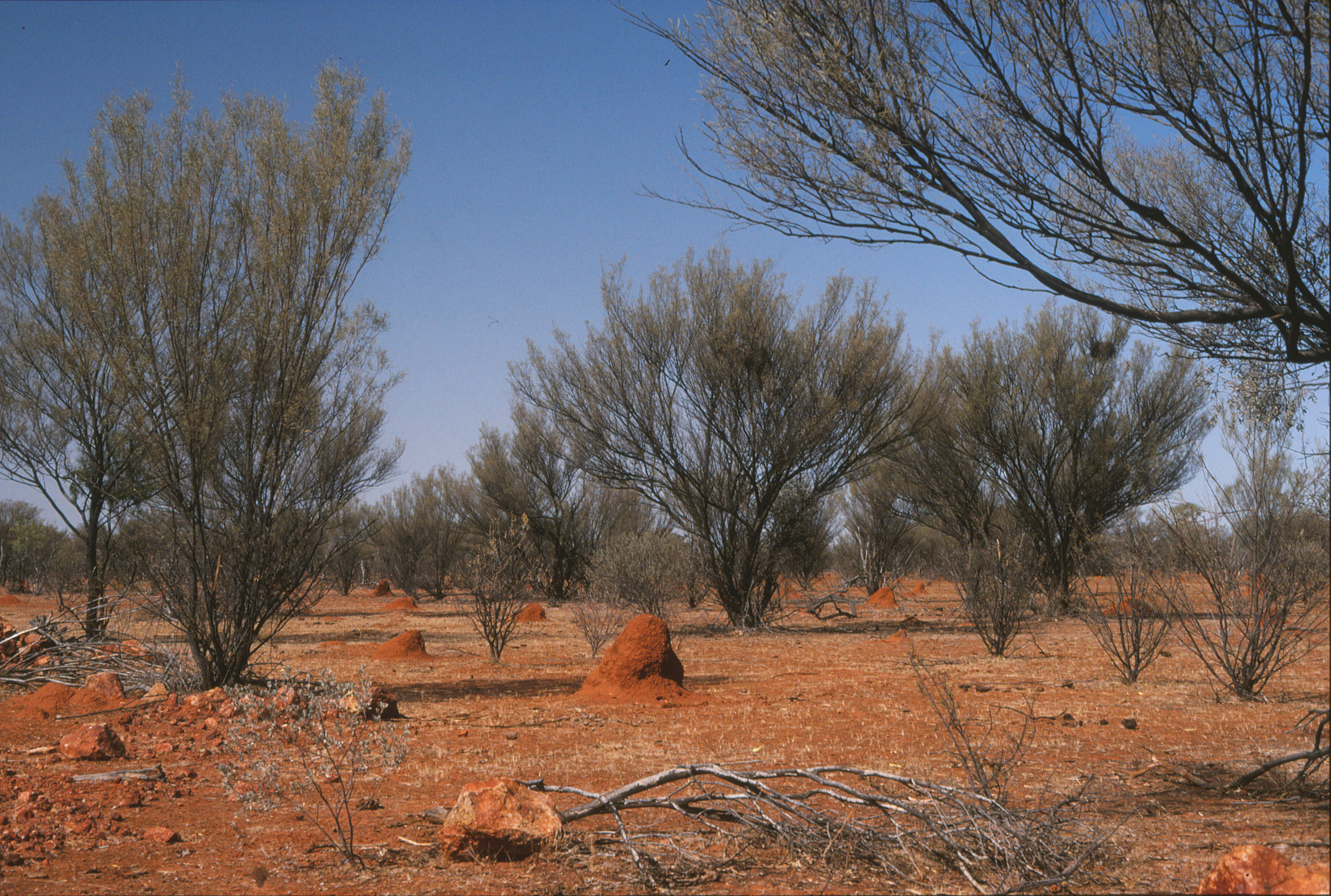
Acacia aneura woodland

Acacia aneura, commonly known as mulga, is a species of flowering plant in the family Fabaceae and is endemic to inland Australia. It is a variable shrub or small tree with flat, narrowly linear to elliptic phyllodes, cylindrical spikes of bright yellow flowers and more or less flat and straight, leathery pods.

== Description ==
Acacia aneura is a variable shrub or small tree that typically grows to a height of 2.5–7 m (8 ft 2 in – 23 ft 0 in), sometimes up to 10 m (33 ft) and is often multistemmed with a bushy crown. Its phyllodes are flat, narrowly linear to narrowly elliptic, 40–100 mm (1.6–3.9 in) long and mostly 1.5–3 mm (0.059–0.118 in) wide, straight or slightly curved. The flowers are borne in a cylindrical head in the axils of phyllodes on a hairy peduncle 3–10 mm (0.12–0.39 in) long. The heads are 15–25 mm (0.59–0.98 in) long and bright yellow. Flowering occurs from March to May or August and the pod is more or less straight and flat, 20–40 mm (0.79–1.57 in) long and 7–15 mm (0.28–0.59 in) wide with a winged edge. The pods are papery, brown to greyish-brown, containing elliptic to oblong or egg-shaped seeds 3.5–5 mm (0.14–0.20 in) long and 2.5–3.0 mm (0.098–0.118 in) with a small whitich or cream-coloured aril.

Aboriginal peoples of the Coober Pedy area in South Australia refer to mulga trees as Umoona, which means "long life".

== Taxonomy ==
Acacia aneura was first formally described in 1855 by George Bentham from an unpublished description by Ferdinand von Mueller. Bentham's description was published in Linnaea: Ein Journal für die Botanik in ihrem ganzen Umfange, oder Beiträge zur Pflanzenkunde. The specific epithet (aneura) means 'without nerves', referring to the phyllodes.

== Distribution and habitat ==
Mulga is endemic to Australia, and is found in Western Australia, the Northern Territory, South Australia, Queensland and New South Wales. In Western Australia it grows in a variety of soils and habitats in the Central Ranges, Coolgardie, Gascoyne, Gibson Desert, Great Sandy Desert, Great Victoria Desert, Little Sandy Desert, Murchison, Nullarbor, Pilbara and Tanami bioregions.

In the Northern Territory it occurs in the Burt Plain, Central Ranges, Channel Country, Davenport Murchison Ranges, Finke, Gawler, Gibson Desert, Great Sandy Desert, Great Victoria Desert, Little Sandy Desert, MacDonnell Ranges, Mitchell Grass Downs, Mount Isa Inlier, Murchison, Pilbara, Simpson Strzelecki Dunefields, Stony Plains and Tanami bioregions.

In South Australia, mulga occurs in scattered population in the north-west of that state and in Queensland it is found in the south-west, but also extend northwards through the Mitchell Grass Downs bioregion and west into the Channel Country.

In New South Wales, Acacia aneura is mainly found west from Nyngan and Griffith and possibly as far east as the Hunter Valley.

== Habitat and ecology ==
Mulga savanna and mulga codominant tussock grasslands cover roughly 20% of the Australian continent, or about 1.5 million square kilometres. The mean rainfall for much of the habitat for A. aneura in Australia is roughly 200–250 mm/year, but it goes to as high as 500 mm/year in New South Wales and Queensland. The lowest mean rainfall where it grows is about 50–60 mm/year. Both summer and winter rainfall are necessary to maintain mulga, and the species is absent from semiarid regions that experience summer or winter drought.

Mulga scrub is distinctive and widespread, with the Mulga Lands of eastern Australia defined as a specific bioregion. The dominant species in these woodlands is mulga, with poplar box (Eucalyptus populnea) forming an increasingly important codominant in the eastern districts. The extent of ground cover in mulga woodlands varies with canopy density of the overstorey, becoming almost nonexistent in extremely dense stands. In more open stands, the herbaceous layer consists of wire grasses (Aristida spp.), mulga oats (Monocather sp.), mulga mitchell (Thyridolepis sp.), wanderrie (Eriachne spp.), finger grasses (Digitaria spp.) and love grasses (Eragrostis spp.). Various other woody species are also significant in mulga woodlands, particularly hop bushes (Dodonaea spp.), Eremophila and cassia (Senna spp.).

In contrast to the eucalypt woodlands that dominate much of Australia, mulga woodlands are not well adapted to regular fire and species in mulga communities vary in their ability to survive fires. Many species, including mulga, have a very limited ability to resprout after fire, and rely instead on mechanisms of seed production for species survival. Many plants produce hard, woody fruits or seeds, which can not only survive intense heat, but also may require the stimulus of fire to scarify and promote germination. Long-lived seed stores in soil is also common in these woodlands.

== Uses ==
=== Agriculture ===
Mulga can be planted with sandalwood in plantations as a host tree. The flowers provide forage for bees, especially when there is enough water available.

Mulga is of great economic importance to the Australian pastoral industry. Despite containing considerable amounts of indigestible tannins, mulga leaves are a valuable fodder source, particularly in times of drought, as they are palatable to stock and provide up to 12% crude protein.

The seeds of Acacia aneura are traditionally used to make seedcakes. The mulga apple is an insect gall commonly eaten by Aboriginal people. Mulga tree gum (ngkwarle alkerampwe in the Arrernte language) is a type of lerp scale found on mulga branches. It provides a honey-like treat.

=== Wood ===
Wood from Acacia aneura stands up very well to being buried in soil, so it is used for posts. The wood has a density of about 850–1100 kg/m^{3}. It is also good as firewood, and good-quality charcoal can be produced from it.

Mulga is a vital tree to Aboriginal Australians in central and Western Australia; the wood is a good hardwood for making various implements, such as digging sticks, woomeras, shields and wooden bowls.
