= Bush tucker =

Food used as sustenance by Indigenous Australians

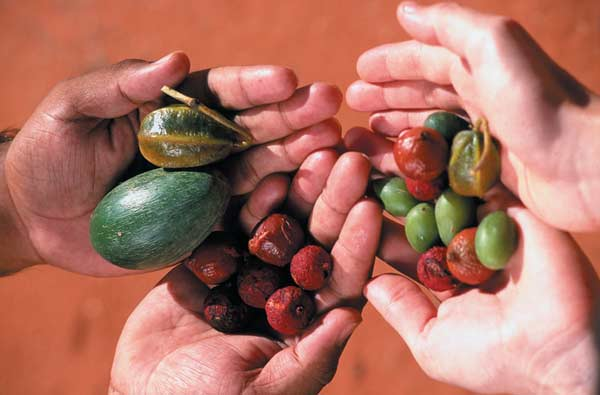
- Bush tucker in Alice Springs
- Country or region: Australia
- Ethnic group: Aboriginal Australians; Torres Strait Islanders

Bush tucker, also called bush food, is any food native to Australia and historically eaten by Aboriginal Australians and Torres Strait Islanders, but it can also describe any native flora, fauna or fungi used for culinary or medicinal purposes, regardless of the continent or culture. Animal native foods include kangaroo, emu, witchetty grubs and crocodile. Plant foods include fruits such as quandong, kutjera, spices such as lemon myrtle and vegetables such as warrigal greens and various native yams.

Traditional Indigenous Australians' use of bush foods has been severely affected by the British colonisation of Australia beginning in 1788 and subsequent settlement by non-Indigenous peoples. The introduction of non-native organisms, together with the loss of and destruction of traditional lands and habitats, has resulted in reduced access to native foods by Aboriginal and Torres Strait Islander people.

Since the 1970s, there has been recognition of the nutritional and gourmet value of native foods by non-Indigenous Australians, and the bushfood industry has grown enormously. Kangaroo meat has been available in supermarkets since the 1980s, and many other foods are sold in restaurants or packaged as gourmet foods, which has led to expansion of commercial cultivation of native food crops.

== History ==
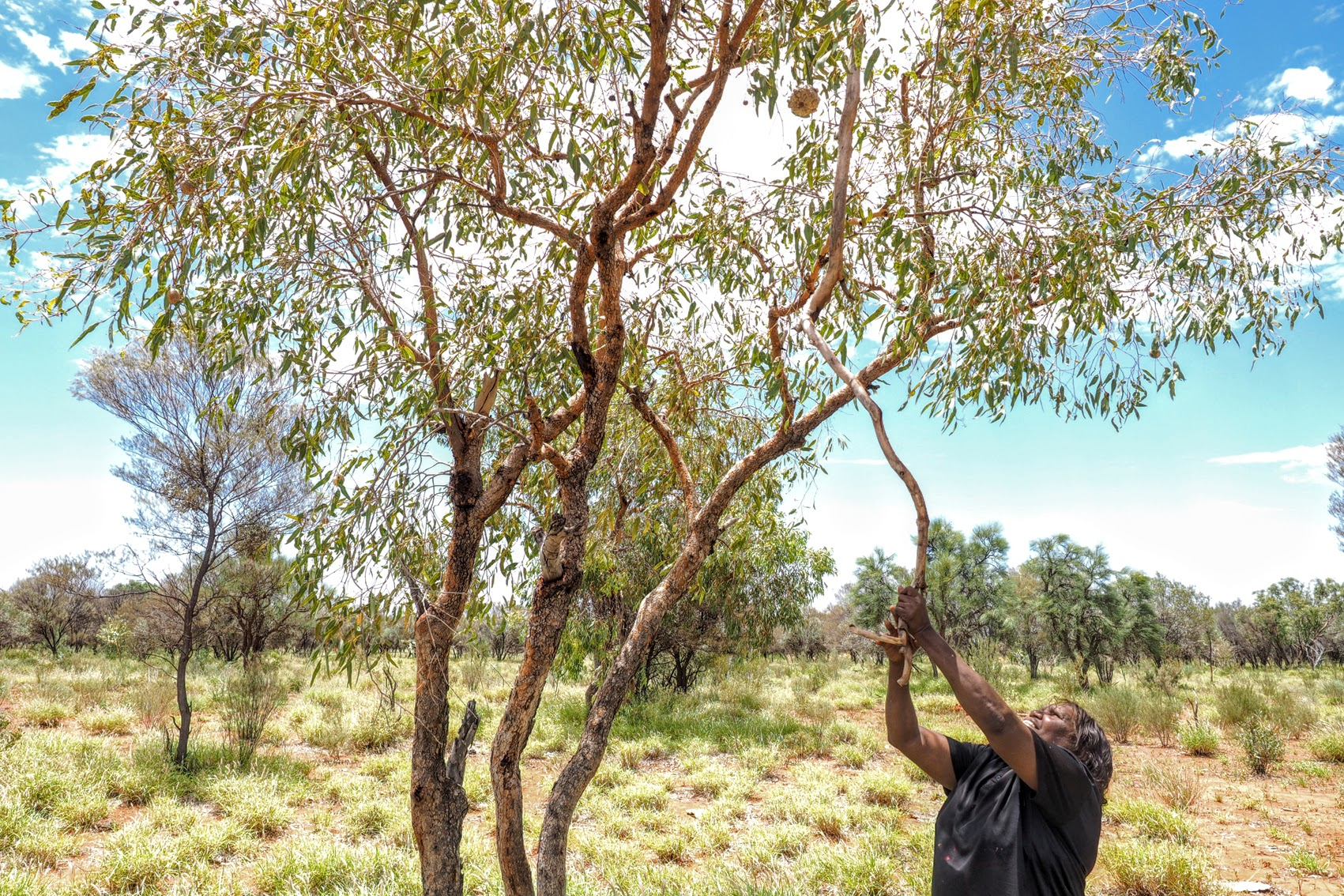
Collecting bush tucker near Yuendumu

Aboriginal Australians have eaten native animal and plant foods for the estimated 60,000 years of human habitation on Mainland Australia and Tasmania, using various traditional methods of processing and cooking. An estimated 4,999 species of native food were used by Aboriginal peoples. With much of it unsafe or unpalatable raw, food was processed by cooking on open fires, boiling in bark containers, pounding vegetables and seeds, or hanging bags in running water.

=== Colonisation ===
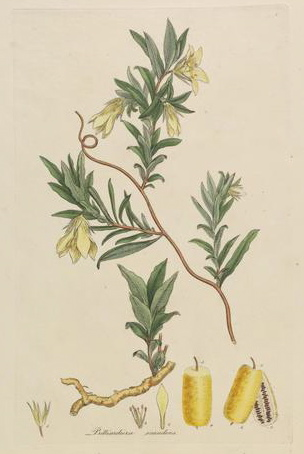
Billardiera scandens

Bush tucker provided a source of nutrition to the non-indigenous colonial settlers, often supplementing meagre rations. However, bushfoods were often considered to be inferior by British and Irish colonists unfamiliar with Australia, generally preferring familiar foods from their homelands.

Especially in the more densely colonised areas of south-eastern Australia, the introduction of non-native foods to Aboriginal and Torres Strait Islander people resulted in an almost complete abandonment of native foods by them. This impact on traditional foods was further accentuated by the loss of traditional lands, which has resulted in reduced access to native foods by Indigenous Australians, and destruction of native habitat for agriculture.

The 19th century English botanist Joseph Dalton Hooker, writing of Australian plants, remarked that although bushtucker is "eatable," it is not "fit to eat". In 1889, botanist Joseph Maiden reiterated this sentiment with the comment on native food plants being "nothing to boast of as eatables." The first monograph to be published on the flora of Australia reported the lack of edible plants on the first page, where it presented Billardiera scandens as, "... almost the only wild eatable fruit of the country".

== Modern use ==
Apart from the macadamia nut, with the first small-scale commercial plantation being planted in Australia in the 1880s, no native food plants were produced commercially until the 1990s. The macadamia was the only Australian native plant food developed and cropped on a large scale. Hawaii, however, was where the macadamia was commercially developed to its greatest extent.

From the 1970s, non-Indigenous Australians began to recognise previously overlooked native Australian foods. Textbooks such as Wildfoods in Australia (1981) by botanists Alan and Joan Cribb were popular. In the late 1970s, horticulturists started to assess native food-plants for commercial use and cultivation.

In 1980, South Australia legalised the sale of kangaroo meat for human consumption, and it is now commonly found in supermarkets and prized for its nutritional value as a lean meat. Analysis shows that a variety of bushfoods are exceptionally nutritious. In the mid-1980s, several Sydney restaurants began using native Australian ingredients in recipes more familiar to non-Indigenous tastes, providing the first opportunity for bushfoods to be tried by non-Indigenous Australians on a gourmet level.

Following popular TV programs on "bush tucker", a surge in interest in the late 1980s saw the publication of books like Bushfood: Aboriginal Food and Herbal Medicine by Jennifer Isaacs, The Bushfood Handbook and Uniquely Australian by Vic Cherikoff, and Wild Food Plants of Australia by Tim Low.

An advantage of growing the native foods is that they are well adapted to Australia's environment, in particular at the extreme ends, and are ecologically sound. Bush-tucker ingredients were initially harvested from the wild, but cultivated sources have become increasingly important to provide sustainable supplies for a growing market, with some Aboriginal communities also involved in the supply chain. However, despite the industry being founded on Aboriginal knowledge of the plants, Aboriginal participation in the commercial sale of bush tucker is currently still marginal, and mostly at the supply end of value chains. Organisations are working to increase Aboriginal participation in the bush-tucker market. Gourmet-style processed food and dried food have been developed for the domestic and export markets.

The term "bushfood" is one of several terms describing native Australian food, evolving from the older-style "bush tucker" which was used in the 1970s and 1980s.

In the 21st century, many restaurants are serving emu, crocodile, yabbies and locally sourced eels, and using native plant spices for flavour. Producers have sprung up across the country to serve the new markets, including Tasmanian pepper, Victorian eel farms and South Australian plantations of quandongs, bush tomatoes, and native citrus.

In 2020, researchers at the University of Queensland were researching a fruit native to Arnhem Land in the Northern Territory, Buchanania obovata, known as the green plum. Eaten for more than 53,000 years but previously little-known among non-Indigenous people, the scientists learnt about the plum from people at the remote community of Yirrkala. It is harvested some time after the Kakadu plum harvests. Nutritional analysis showed high levels of protein, dietary fibre and the minerals potassium, phosphorus and magnesium. In addition, the folate level is among the highest of commercially available fruits. Its potential as a commercial crop for Indigenous communities is being investigated.

== Types of foods ==
Toxic seeds, such as Cycas media and Moreton Bay chestnut, are processed to remove the toxins and render them safe to eat. Many foods are also baked in the hot campfire coals, or baked for several hours in ground ovens. "Paperbark", the bark of Melaleuca species, is widely used for wrapping food placed in ground ovens. Bush bread was made by women using many types of seeds, nuts and corns to process a flour or dough. Some animals, such as kangaroos, were cooked in their own skins, and others, such as turtles, were cooked in their own shells.

Kangaroo is quite common and can be found in Australian supermarkets, often cheaper than beef. Other animals, for example, jimba (sheep), emu, goanna and witchetty grubs, are eaten by Aboriginal Australians. Fish and shellfish are culinary features of the Australian coastal communities.

Examples of Australian native plant foods include the fruits quandong, kutjera, muntries, riberry, Davidson's plum, and finger lime. Native spices include lemon myrtle, mountain pepper, and the kakadu plum. Various native yams are valued as food, and a popular leafy vegetable is warrigal greens. Nuts include bunya nut and the most identifiable bush tucker plant harvested and sold in large-scale commercial quantities, the macadamia nut. Knowledge of Aboriginal uses of fungi is meagre, but beefsteak fungus and native "bread" (a fungus also) were certainly eaten.

== Native Australian food-plants listed by culinary province and plant part ==
Australian bush tucker plants can be divided into several distinct and large regional culinary provinces. Some species listed grow across several climatic boundaries.

Adansonia gregorii	boab
Buchanania arborescens	sparrow's mango
Citrus gracilis	kakadu lime
Eugenia carissoides	Cedar Bay cherry
Ficus racemosa	cluster fig
Manilkara kauki	wongi
Melastoma affine	blue tongue
Mimusops elengi	tanjong
Morinda citrifolia	great morinda
Physalis minima	native gooseberry
Terminalia ferdinandiana	kakadu plum
Syzygium erythrocalyx	Johnstone's River satinash
Syzygium fibrosum	fibrous satinash
Syzygium suborbiculare	lady apple

=== Vegetables ===
Dioscorea alata	purple yam
Dioscorea bulbifera	round yam
Dioscorea transversa	pencil yam, long yam
Eleocharis palustris	spikerush
Ipomoea aquatica	water spinach
Nelumbo nucifera	lotus
Nymphaea macrosperma	water lily

=== Nuts ===
Cycas media	cycad palm seeds (requires detoxification: see Bush bread )
Semecarpus australiensis	Australian cashew
Terminalia catappa	sea almond

=== Spices ===
Eucalyptus staigeriana	lemon ironbark
Melaleuca leucadendra	weeping paperbark
Melaleuca viridiflora	kitcha-kontoo
Ocimum tenuiflorum	native basil

=== Outback Australia ===
Arid and semi-arid zones of the low rainfall interior.

==== Fruits ====
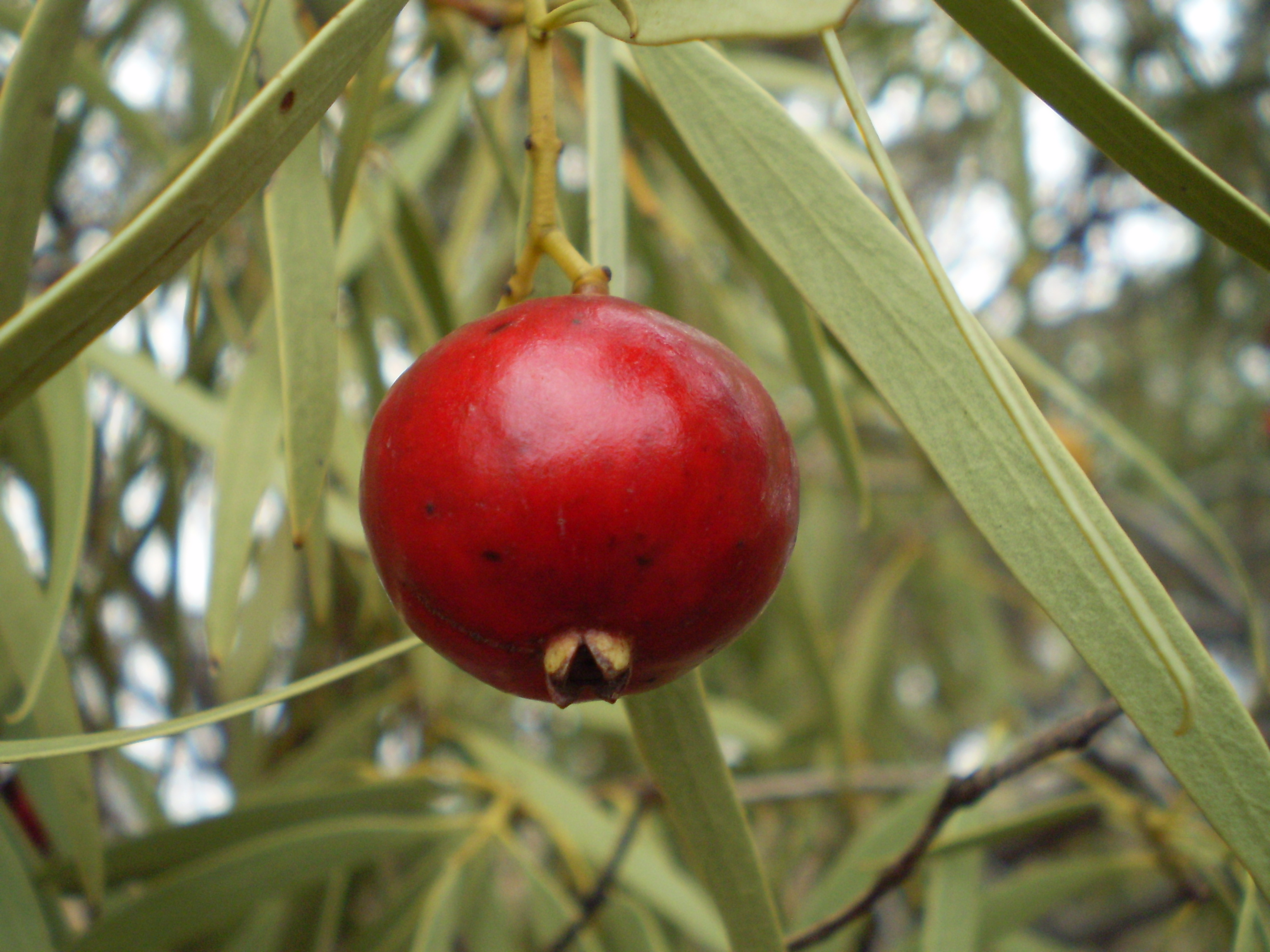
Desert quandong

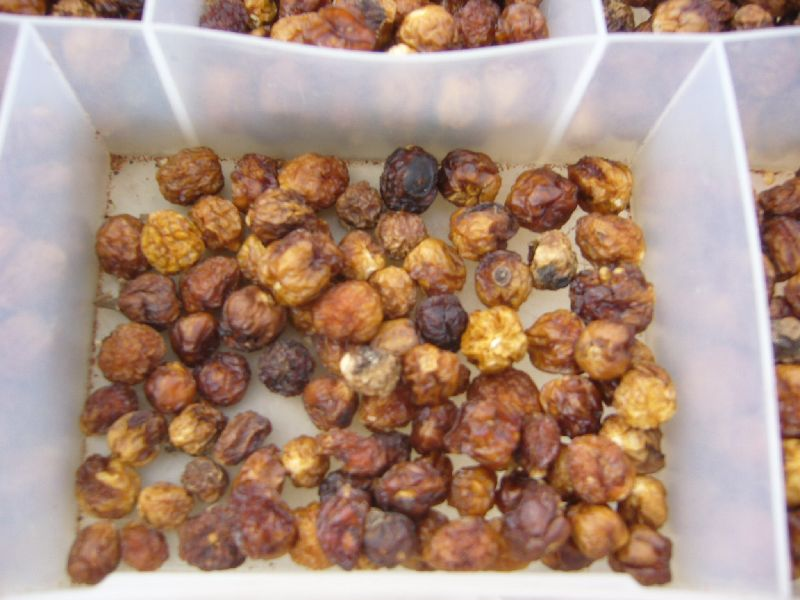
Bush tomatoes

Capparis spp.	native caper, caperbush
Capparis mitchellii	wild orange
Capparis spinosa subsp. nummularia	wild passionfruit
Carissa lanceolata	bush plum, conkerberry
Citrus glauca	desert lime
Enchylaena tomentosa	ruby saltbush
Ficus platypoda	desert fig
Marsdenia australis	doubah, bush banana
Owenia acidula	emu apple
Santalum acuminatum	quandong, desert or sweet quandong
Santalum murrayanum	bitter quandong
Solanum centrale	akudjura, Australian desert raisin, bush tomato
Solanum cleistogarnum	bush tomato
Solanum ellipticum	bush tomato

==== Vegetables ====
Calandrinia balonensis	parakeelya
Ipomoea costata	bush potato
Vigna lanceolata	pencil yams
Lepidium spp.	peppercresses
Portulaca intraterranea	large pigweed

==== Seeds ====
Acacia aneura	mulga
Acacia colei
Acacia coriacea	dogwood
Acacia holosericea	strap wattle
Acacia kempeana	witchetty bush
Acacia murrayana
Acacia pycnantha
Acacia retinodes
Acacia tetragonophylla	dead finish seed
Acacia victoriae	gundabluey, prickly wattle
Brachychiton populneus	kurrajong
Panicum decompositum	native millet
Portulaca oleracea	pigweed
Triodia spp.	commonly known as spinifex

==== Spices ====
Eucalyptus polybractea	blue-leaved mallee

==== Insects in gall ====
- Bush coconut
- Mulga apple

=== Eastern Australia ===
Subtropical rainforests of New South Wales to the wet tropics of Northern Queensland.

==== Fruit ====
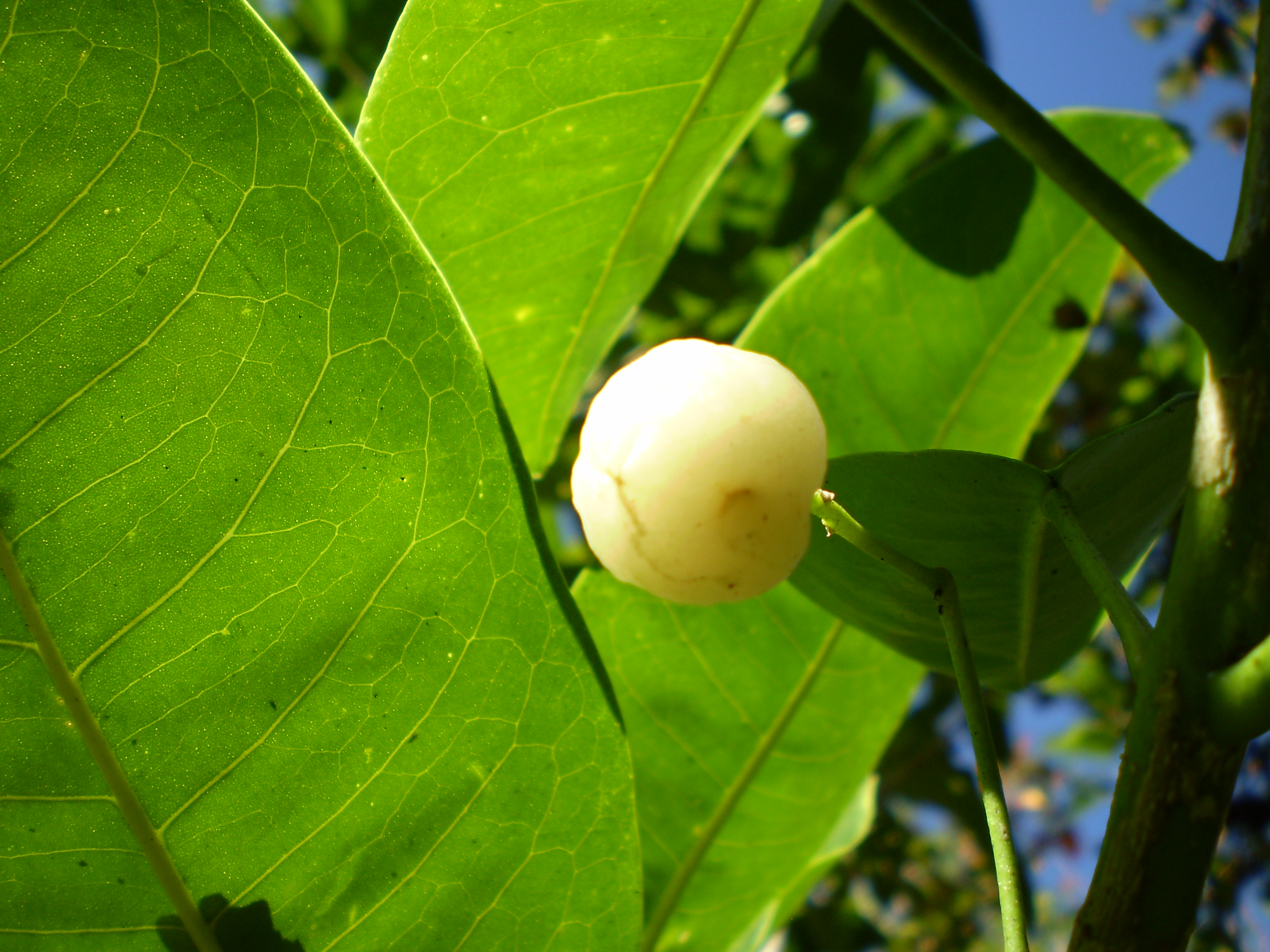
Lemon aspen

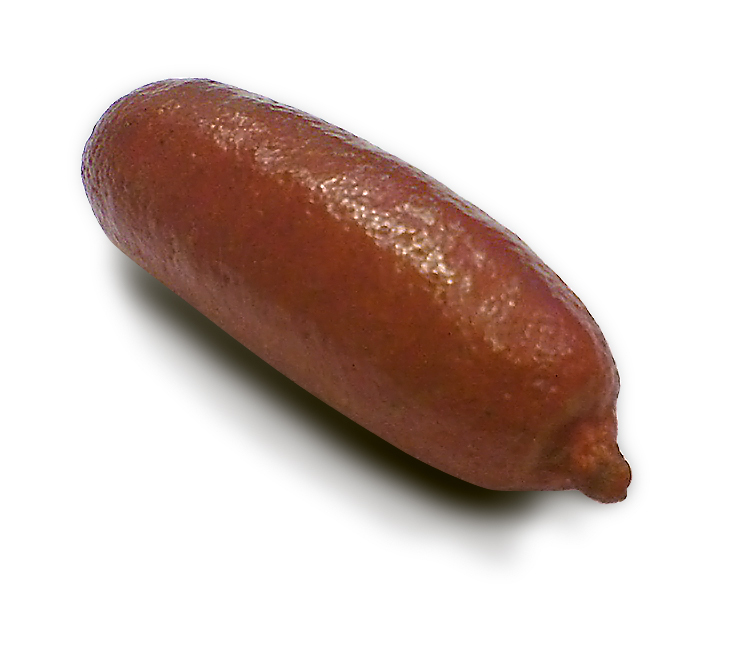
Finger lime

Acronychia acidula	lemon aspen
Acronychia oblongifolia	white aspen
Antidesma bunius	Herbet River cherry
Archirhodomyrtus beckleri	rose myrtle
Austromyrtus dulcis	midyim
Carpobrotus glaucescens	pigface
Citrus australasica	finger lime
Citrus australis	dooja
Davidsonia jerseyana	New South Wales Davidson's plum
Davidsonia johnsonii	smooth davidsonia
Davidsonia pruriens	North Queensland Davidson's plum
Diploglottis campbellii	small-leaf tamarind
Eupomatia laurina	bolwarra
Ficus coronata	sandpaper fig
Melodorum leichhardtii	zig zag vine
Pandanus tectorius	Hala fruit
Pleiogynium timoriense	Burdekin plum
Podocarpus elatus	Illawarra plum
Planchonella australis	black apple
Rubus moluccanus	broad-leaf bramble
Rubus probus	Atherton raspberry
Rubus rosifolius	rose-leaf bramble
Syzygium australe	brush cherry
Syzygium luehmannii	riberry
Syzygium paniculatum	magenta lilly pilly
Ximenia americana	yellow plum

==== Vegetable ====
Apium prostratum	sea celery
Commelina cyanea	scurvy weed
Geitonoplesium cymosum	scrambling lily
Tetragonia tetragonoides	warrigal greens
Trachymene incisa	wild parsnip
Urtica incisa	scrub nettle

==== Spices ====
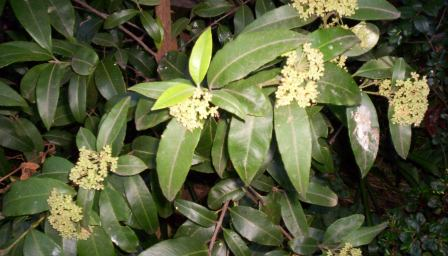
Lemon myrtle

Alpinia caerulea	native ginger
Backhousia citriodora	lemon myrtle
Backhousia myrtifolia	cinnamon myrtle
Backhousia anisata	aniseed myrtle
Leptospermum liversidgei	lemon tea-tree
Prostanthera incisa	cut-leaf mintbush, native thyme
Smilax glyciphylla	sweet sarsaparilla
Syzygium anisatum	aniseed myrtle
Tasmannia stipitata	Dorrigo pepper (leaf and pepperberry)

==== Nut ====
Araucaria bidwillii	bunya nut
Athertonia diversifolia	Atherton almond
Macadamia integrifolia	macadamia nut
Macadamia tetraphylla	bush nut
Sterculia quadrifida	peanut tree

=== Temperate Australia ===
Warm and cool temperate zones of southern Australia, including Tasmania, South Australia, Victoria and the highlands of New South Wales.

==== Tasmania ====
Scientific name	Common name	Edible part of plant	Use	Details	Citation
Acacia mearnsii	Black wattle	Bark	Tea	Bark can be soaked to make a tea, which is claimed to be good for indigestion.	
Kennedia prostrata	Running postman's	Flower	Garnish	The nectar from the flowers is edible.	
Lomandra longifolia	Sagg	Flower	Garnish	Young leaves, flowers and seeds are ideal	
Wahlenbergia multicaulis	Bushy bluebell	Flower	Garnish		
Wahlenbergia stricta		Flower	Garnish		
Xanthorrhoea australis	Grass tree	Flower	Garnish	The nectar from the flowers is edible.	
Viola hederacea	Wild violet	Flower	Salad	The flowers are edible and can be used in salads.	
Astroloma humifusum	Native cranberry	Fruity loops	Fruit	The berries can be consumed, when ripe.	
Astroloma pinifolium	Pine heath	Fruit	Fruit	The berries can be consumed, when ripe.	
Billardiera longiflora	Mountain blue berry	Fruit	Fruit	Edible fruit when ripe	
Billardiera scandens	Apple dumplings	Fruit	Fruit	The berries can be consumed, when ripe.	
Coprosma nitida	Mountain currant	Fruit	Fruit	The berries can be consumed, when ripe.	
Coprosma quadrifida	Native currant	Fruit	Fruit	Edible berries – raw or stewed	
Dianella brevicaulis	Shortstem flaxlily	Fruit	Fruit	The berries can be consumed, when ripe.	
Dianella revoluta	Spreading flaxlily	Fruit	Fruit	The berries can be consumed, when ripe.	
Dianella tasmanica	Blue flax lily	Fruit	Fruit	The berries can be consumed, when ripe.	
Chenopodium nutans (Syn Einardia nutans, Rhagodia nutans)	Climbing saltbush	Fruit	Fruit	The fruit can be consumed, when ripe.	
Solanum laciniatum	Kangaroo apple	Fruit	Fruit	Only the very ripe fruit is edible... Note: the green fruit is POISONOUS.	
Tasmannia lanceolata	Native pepper	Fruit	Fruit	If the berries are dried, they can be consumed.	
Acmena smithii	Lilly pilly	Fruit	Jam/compote	Berries can either be eaten raw or made into a jam or compote.	
Carpobrotus rossii	Native pigface	Fruit	Jam/compote	The ripe fruit eaten raw or made into a compote.	
Acacia mearnsii	Black wattle	Gum	Condiment		
Eucalyptus gunnii	Cider gum	Gum	Condiment	The gum is sweet and edible and was used to make a fermented beverage, called way-a-linah	
Lomandra longifolia	Sagg	Leaf/shoot	Salad	Consume the young leaves	
Phragmites australis	Common reed	Leaf/shoot	Salad		
Suaeda australis	Seablite	Leaf/shoot	Salad		
Tasmannia lanceolata	Native pepper	Leaf/shoot	Salad	Dry the leaves before consumption.	
Xanthorrhoea australis	Grass tree	Leaf/shoot	Salad	The young leaves can be consumed.	
Ozothamnus obcordatus	Native thyme	Leaf/shoot	Seasoning	When the leaves are dried, their taste resembled that of thyme. It can be used as a seasoning.	
Correa alba	White correa	Leaf/shoot	Tea	The leave may be used to prepare a tea.	
Hardenbergia violacea	Sarsparilla vine	Leaf/shoot	Tea	In order to make a tea, the leaves need to be initially boiled, then dried.	
Kunzea ambigua	White kunzea	Leaf/shoot	Tea	A refreshing tea can be made from the dried leaves.	
Atriplex cinerea	Grey saltbush	Leaf/shoot	Vegetable	In order to remove some of the salt from the leaves, the leaves need to be thoroughly soaked in water. After rinsing, the leaves can be used as a type of vegetable / salad.	
Tetragonia implexicoma	Bower spinach	Leaf/shoot	Vegetable	The leaves are edible in both a raw or cooked state.	
Cycnogeton procerum (formerly: Triglochin procera)	Water ribbons	Leaf/shoot	Vegetable	The leaves are edible in both a raw or cooked state.	
Typha domingensis	Bulrush	Leaf/shoot	Salad	Consume the young shoots from the plant.	
Typha orientalis	Broad-leafed, bulrush	Leaf/shoot	Salad	Consume the young shoots from the plant.	
Arthropodium milleflorum	Vanilla lily	Root/tuber/bulb	Vegetable	The tubers can be consumed in both a raw or roasted state.	
Arthropodium strictum	Chocolate lily	Root/tuber/bulb	Vegetable	The tubers can be consumed in both a raw or roasted state. NOTE: the chocolate scented flowers are NOT edible, however.	
Bolboschoenus caldwellii	Sea clubsedge	Root/tuber/bulb	Vegetable	The roots are edible once they have been roasted.	
Bulbine bulbosa	Golden rock lily	Root/tuber/bulb	Vegetable	The bulb of the plant can be consumed after it has been roasted. It is particularly nutritious.	
Burchardia umbellata	Milk maids	Root/tuber/bulb	Vegetable	The tuber of the plant can be consumed once it has been roasted.	
Clematis aristata	Travellers joy	Root/tuber/bulb	Vegetable	Once the taproot has been roasted, it is edible.	
Clematis microphylla	Small Leaf Clematis	Root/tuber/bulb	Vegetable	Once the taproot has been roasted, it is edible.	
Convolvulus angustissimus	Pink moonflower	Root/tuber/bulb	Vegetable	Once the taproot has been roasted, it is edible.	
Eleocharis sphacelata	Tall rush spike	Root/tuber/bulb	Vegetable	The roots are edible	
Geranium solanderi	Southern cranesbill	Root/tuber/bulb	Vegetable	Once the taproot has been roasted, it is edible.	
Microseris walteri	Yam daisy, murnong	Root/tuber/bulb	Vegetable	The tubers can be consumed in both a raw or roasted state.	
Phragmites australis	Common reed	Root/tuber/bulb	Vegetable		
Xanthorrhoea australis	Grass tree	Root/tuber/bulb	Vegetable	The young roots are edible	
Typha domingensis	Bulrush	Root/tuber/bulb	Vegetable		
Typha orientalis	Broad-leafed, bulrush	Root/tuber/bulb	Vegetable		
Dodonaea viscosa	Native hop	Seed	Alcohol	Seeds can be used instead of hops to brew beer	
Acacia melanoxylon	Blackwood	Seed	Nuts		
Acacia retinodes	Wirilda	Seed	Nuts	Both the seeds and green pods can be consumed.	
Acacia sophorae	Boobyalla/coast wattle	Seed	Nuts	The seeds can be consumed in both the raw or roasted state.	
Brachychiton populneus	Kurrajong (tas prov)	Seed	Nuts	The seeds of this plant are particularly nutritious. The seeds can be consumed in both the raw or roasted state.	
Lomandra longifolia	Sagg	Seed	Nuts		
Phragmites australis	Common reed	Seed	Nuts		
Acacia mearnsii	Black wattle	Seed	Nuts		
Sarcocornia quinqueflora	Samphire or glasswort	Stem	Fibre	Consumption of the younger stems of the plant is suggested	
Phragmites australis	Common reed	Stem	Fibre		

==== Fruits ====
Acrotriche depressa	native currant
Billardiera cymosa	sweet apple-berry
Billardiera longiflora	purple apple-berry
Billardiera scandens	common apple-berry
Carpobrotus rossii	karkalla
Exocarpus cupressiformis	native cherry
Gaultheria hispida	snow berry
Kunzea pomifera	muntries
Rubus parvifolius	pink-flowered native raspberry
Sambucus gaudichaudiana	white elderberry
Enchylaena tomentosa	ruby saltbush

==== Seeds ====
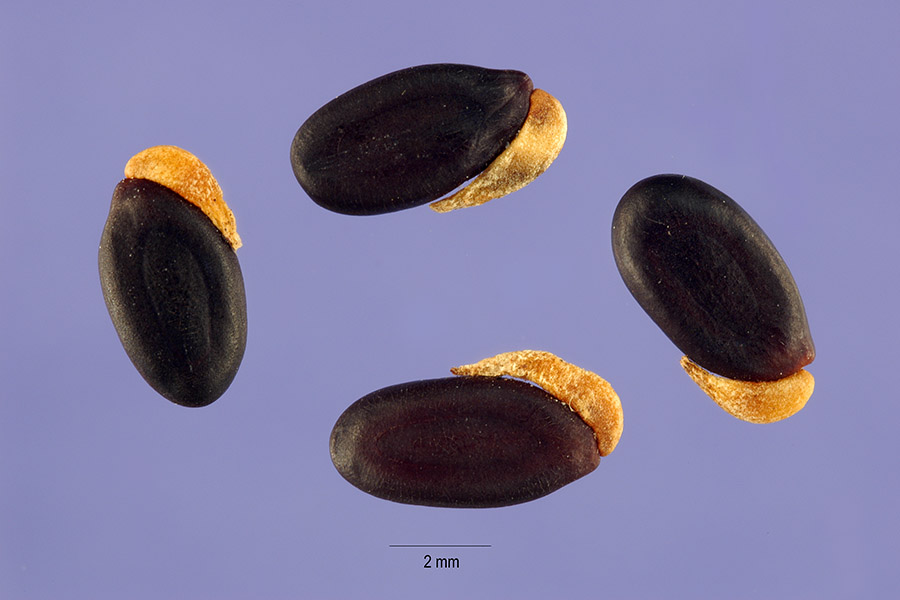
Seeds of Acacia longifolia

Acacia longifolia	golden rods
Acacia sophorae	coast wattle (All Acacia seeds can be ground into a bush flour.)

==== Spices ====
Eucalyptus dives	peppermint gum
Eucalyptus olida	strawberry gum
Eucalyptus globulus	tasmanian blue gum
Mentha australis	river mint
Prostanthera rotundifolia	native thyme
Tasmannia lanceolata	mountain pepper
Tasmannia stipitata	Dorrigo pepper

==== Vegetables ====
Apium insulare	Flinders Island celery
Atriplex cinerea	grey saltbush
Burchardia umbellata	milkmaids
Eustrephus latifolius	wombat berry
Microseris walteri	murnong

==== Leaves ====
Neptune's necklace (the beady seaweed) – the beads are pierced to get rid of the salt water before being cooked
Warrigal greens – tastes like spinach, pest-resistant and spreads easily
Coast sword-sedge – the leaf bases can be eaten raw or roasted

== In media ==
Malcolm Douglas was one of the first TV presenters to show how to 'live off the land' in the Australian Outback. Major Les Hiddins, a retired Australian Army soldier popularised the idea of bush tucker as a food resource. He presented a TV series called The Bush Tucker Man on the ABC TV network in the late 1980s. In the series, Hiddins demonstrated his research for NORFORCE in identifying foods which might sustain or augment army forces in the northern Australian Outback.

Starting in 2002, I'm A Celebrity... Get Me Out of Here! became notorious for its "Bushtucker Trials", some of which involved eating meat-based bush tucker (such as mealworms, locusts and kangaroo testicles) to win meals for the camp.

In early 2003, the first cooking show featuring authentic Australian foods and called Dining Downunder was produced by Vic Cherikoff and Bailey Park Productions of Toronto, Canada. This was followed by the Special Broadcasting Service (SBS) production of Message Stick with Aboriginal chef, Mark Olive.

In 2008, Ray Mears made a survival television series called Ray Mears Goes Walkabout, which focused on the history of survival in Australia with a focus on bush tucker.

In the TV survival series Survivorman, host and narrator Les Stroud spent time in the Australian outback. After successfully finding and eating a witchetty grub raw he found many more and cooked them, stating they were much better cooked. After cooking in hot embers of his fire, he removed the head and the hind of the grub and squeezed out thick yellow liquid before eating.

The SBS documentary series Food Safari featured bush tucker in an episode that went to air, in 2013.

== See also ==
- Australian Aboriginal sweet foods
- Australian cuisine
- Bush bread
- Bushfood industry history
- Bushmeat
- Bush medicine
- Damper
- Indigenous Australian food groups
- Country food, equivalent term in Canada used to refer to food eaten by the Indigenous peoples of Canada
- Medieval cuisine, cuisine of the Middle Ages in Europe
- Pre-Columbian cuisine, ancient cuisine of the Americas
