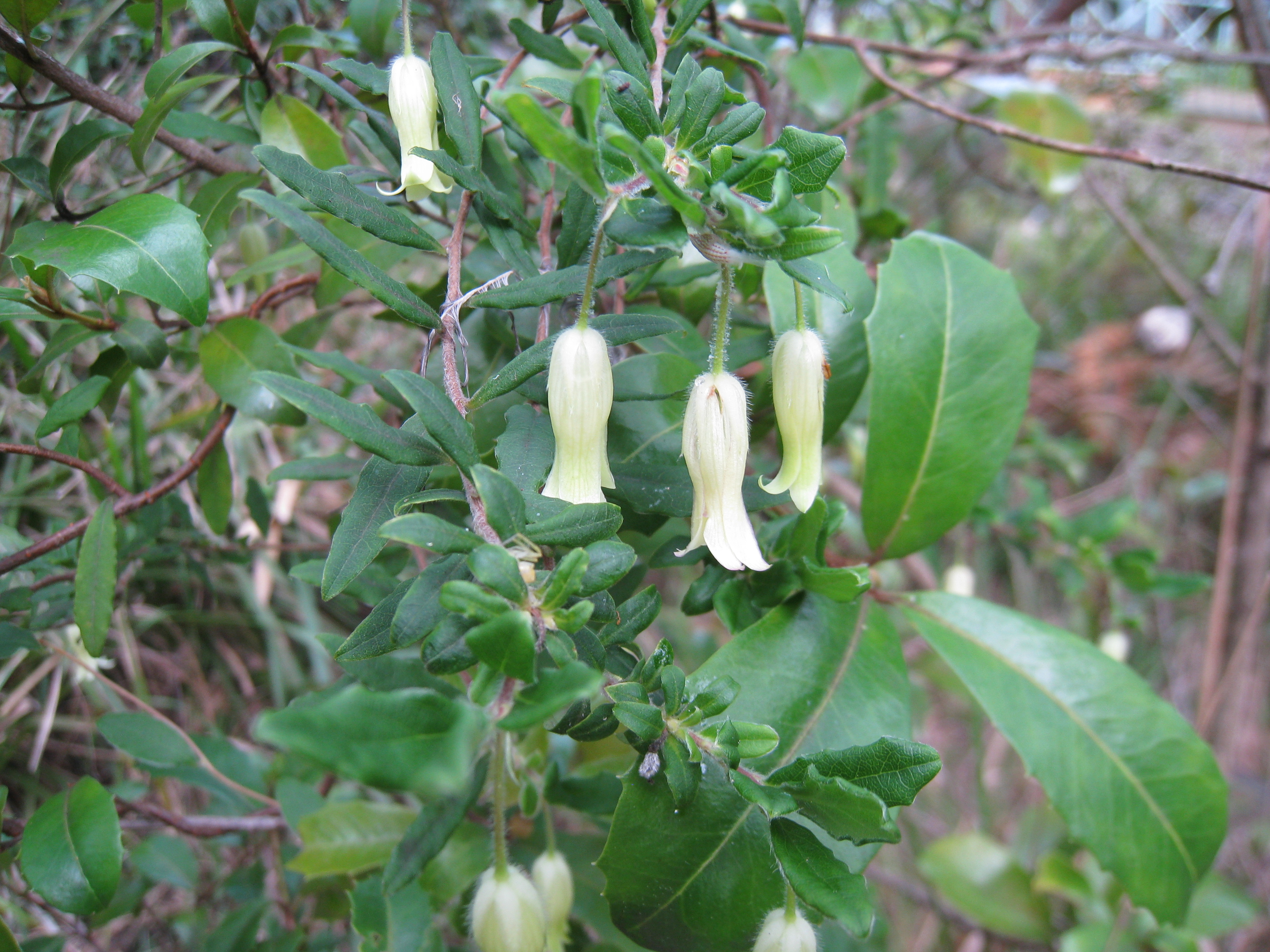
- Billardiera scandens growing in Como
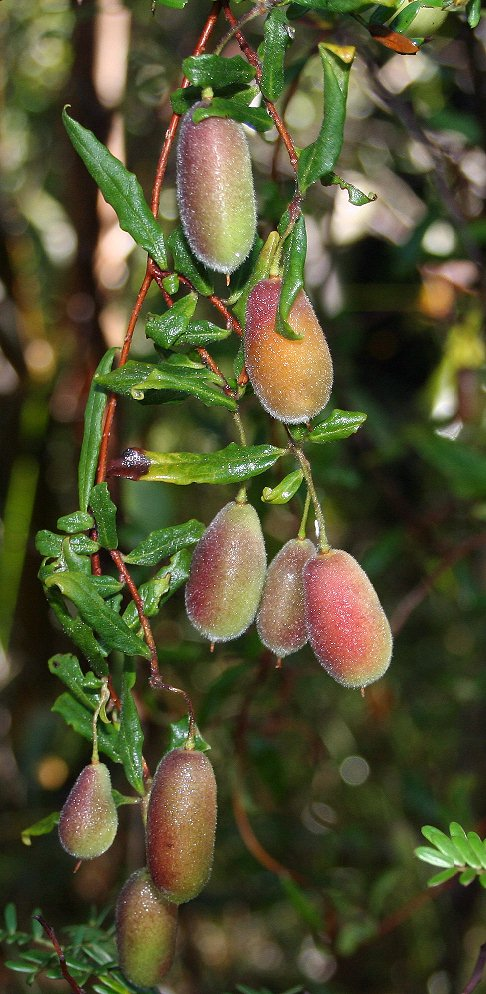
- Fruit

Scientific classification
- Kingdom: Plantae
- Clade: Embryophytes
- Clade: Tracheophytes
- Clade: Spermatophytes
- Clade: Angiosperms
- Clade: Eudicots
- Clade: Asterids
- Order: Apiales
- Family: Pittosporaceae
- Genus: Billardiera
- Species: B. scandens

Binomial name
- Billardiera scandens Sm.
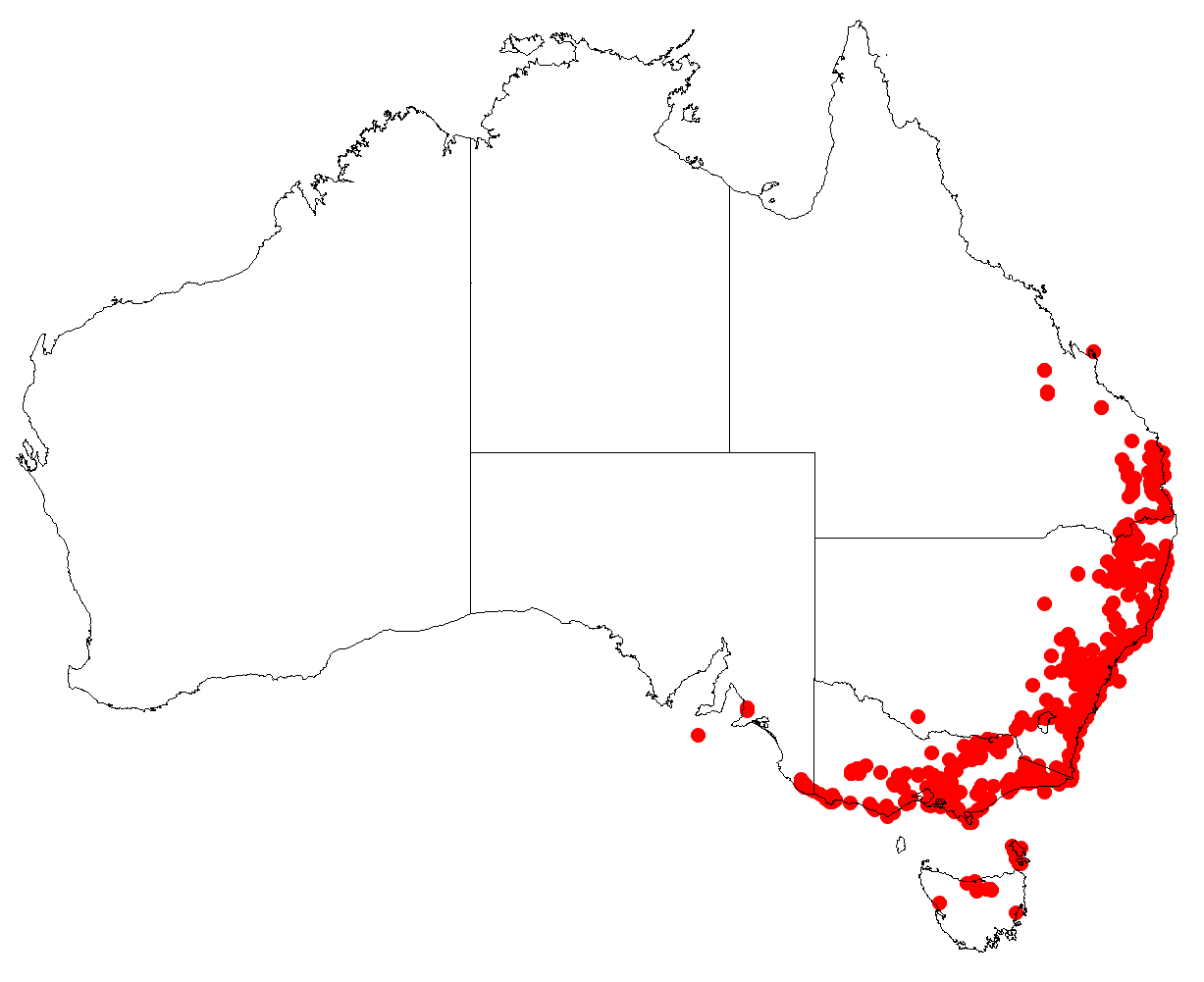
- Occurrence data from Australasian Virtual Herbarium

Synonyms
- List: Billardiera angustifolia DC.; Billardiera brachyantha F.Muell. nom. inval., nom. nud.; Billardiera brachyantha F.Muell. ex Klatt; Billardiera brachyantha F.Muell. ex Klatt var. brachyantha; ? Billardiera brachyantha var. phyllocalyx Klatt; Billardiera canariensis J.C.Wendl.; ? Billardiera daphnoides Knowles & Westc.; Billardiera grandiflora Putt. nom. illeg., nom. superfl.; Billardiera grandiflora Putt.; Billardiera latifolia Putt. nom. illeg., nom. superfl.; Billardiera latifolia Putt.; Billardiera scandens var. brachyantha (F.Muell. ex Klatt) Benth.; Billardiera scandens Sm. var. scandens; Billardiera scandens var. sericata E.M.Benn. p.p.; Labillardiera scandens (Sm.) Schult.

= Billardiera scandens =

Apple berry

Species of flowering plant

Billardiera scandens, commonly known as hairy apple berry or common apple-berry, is a small shrub or twining plant of the Pittosporaceae family which occurs in forests in the coastal and tableland areas of all states and territories in Australia, apart from the Northern Territory and Western Australia. It has a silky touch and appearance that becomes more brittle as the dense growth matures. The inflorescence consists of single or paired yellow flowers, pink-tinged yellow sepals and bright yellow petals and is attached to a hairy drooping peduncle. The summer flush produces fruit of oblong berries up to 30 mm long, initially green in colour and covered in fine hair - somewhat akin to a tiny kiwifruit in appearance.

== Taxonomy and naming ==
Billardiera scandens was first formally described in 1793 by James Edward Smith, and the description was published in his book A Specimen of the Botany of New Holland. In 1819 the genus was renamed Labillardiera by Josef August Schultes, but this was later declared illegal under the laws of botanical nomenclature. A cladistic analysis of the genus in 2004 resulted in an expanded circumscription of this species, encompassing material that was previously placed in B. angustifolia, B. brachyantha, B. daphnoides, B. latifolia and B. canariensis. All of these names are now considered taxonomic synonyms of B. scandens.

== Uses ==
The flowers and fruit of apple berry are attractive to both birds and people. The fruits, which only ripen after dropping to the ground, are valued as an Australian bush food and are variously described as tasting like stewed apples or kiwifruit. Aboriginal Australians eat these as bush food either in their ripened state or by roasting the unripened fruit.

Botanist Joseph Maiden noted in 1898 that children of European settlers in the Port Jackson area, where it is commonly found, had been eating the berries since the foundation of the settlement in 1788. He also noted in 1889 that it was commonly referred to as "Apple Berry" and that "The berries are acid and pleasant when fully ripe. From their shape children call them "dumplings." When unripe, a small quantity of the juice produces very disagreeable and persistent heartburn."

== Use in horticulture ==
Apple berry is a popular choice in Australian gardens, especially those favouring indigenous plants as a rambling yet non-dominant shrub, especially beneath eucalypts and between other native species. The species is also grown in gardens around the world and is easily propagated and maintained. It is an adaptable plant, and will withstand a wide range of conditions, including mild frost, semi-shade and periods of dryness although it performs best in moist conditions. It also tolerates a wide variety of soils, including clay.
