= Vic Cherikoff =

Australian native food authority

Vic Cherikoff is regarded as an authority on Australian native foods and its associated industry, having been involved in the selection and commercialization of many of the 35 or so indigenous Australian plant foods now in the market place.

He is an author of three books and a number of scientific papers. He promotes Australian cuisine through his cooking show, Dining Downunder, which has screened in 48 countries. He funded, produced, and hosted this TV show, along with chefs, Benjamin Christie and Mark McCluskey. Together with Christie, Cherikoff also runs Australian cuisine promotions around the world, often working together with Austrade and international hotels.

In the 1980s, Cherikoff worked in the Human Nutrition Unit of the University of Sydney researching the nutritional value of Australian native foods with Professor Jennie Brand-Miller. Cherikoff has a bachelor's degree in Applied Science from the University of Technology and a background in research in clinical pharmacology as well as nutritional science.

In the mid-1980s he started Bush Tucker Supply Pty Ltd, which later became a division of Vic Cherikoff Food Services Pty Ltd. This wholesaling, and product development, business markets indigenous ingredients to chefs, provides ingredients to manufacturers of food and beverage, the cosmetic industry, and is involved in publishing and television. As a wholesaler, Cherikoff played a role in the early development of the Australian native foods industry by connecting the regional native foods movement with the market place; networking with Aboriginal communities for supply and working with other bushfood industry pioneers.

Cherikoff has authored several books on Australian native food, including The Bushfood Handbook. His next book was a cookbook, Uniquely Australian, a wild food cookbook, and Dining Downunder Cookbook, co-authored with Benjamin Christie.

Cherikoff has continued the development of the ingredients themselves, to suit the modern kitchen and manufacturing processes, soluble essential oils, encapsulated products, infused oils, super-critical CO_{2} extracts, proprietary blends and formulae, etc. He has also expanded into retail products.

== Works ==
- Cherikoff, Vic, The Bushfood Handbook, ISBN 0-7316-6904-5
- Cherikoff, Vic, Uniquely Australian, ISBN 0-646-07470-9
- Cherikoff, Vic and Christie, Benjamin, The Dining Downunder Cookbook, ISBN 0-9752021-0-3
