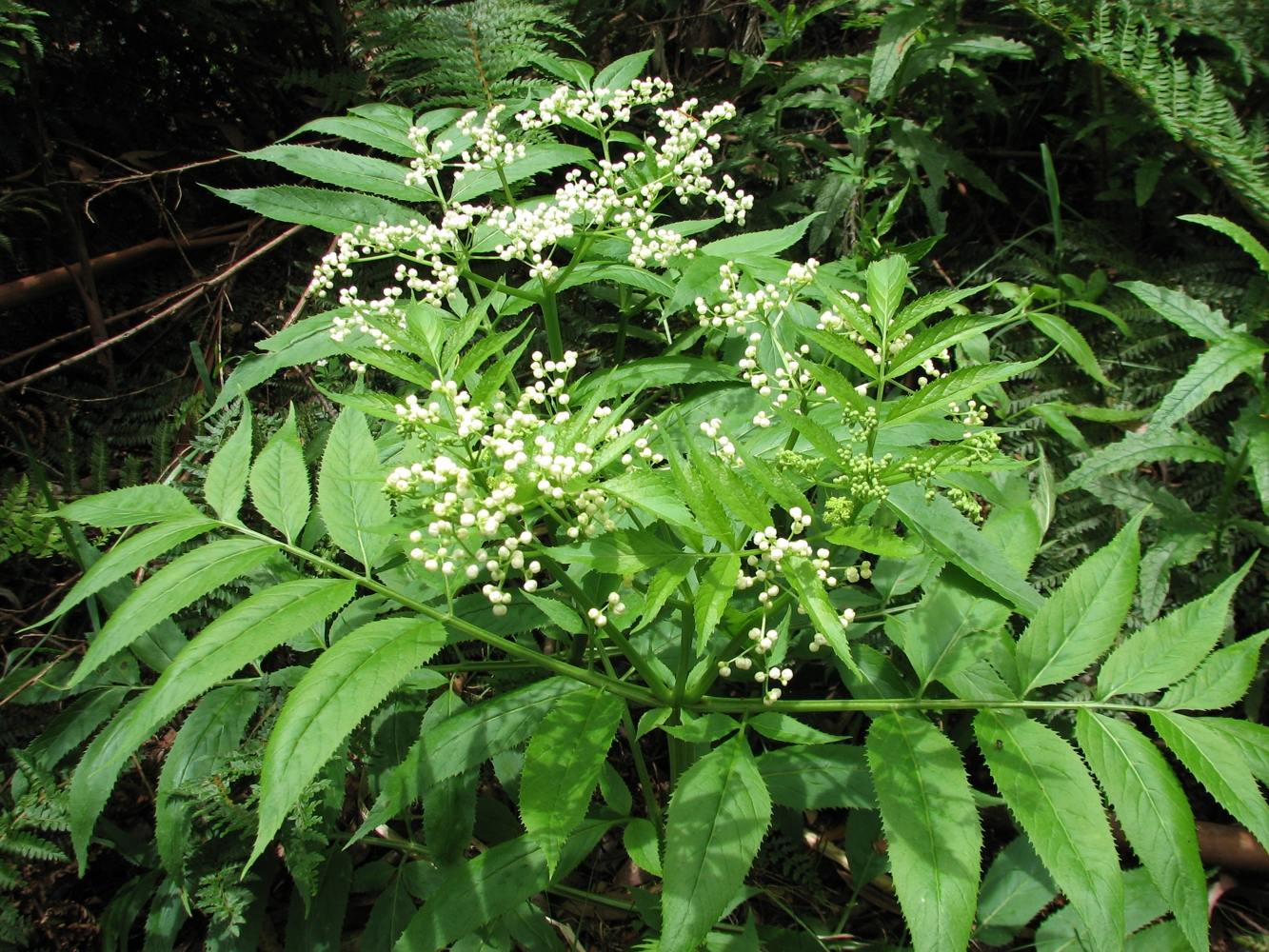
- On Mount Donna Buang, Victoria

Scientific classification
- Kingdom: Plantae
- Clade: Tracheophytes
- Clade: Angiosperms
- Clade: Eudicots
- Clade: Asterids
- Order: Dipsacales
- Family: Viburnaceae
- Genus: Sambucus
- Species: S. gaudichaudiana

Binomial name
- Sambucus gaudichaudiana DC.

= Sambucus gaudichaudiana =

Species of plant

Sambucus gaudichaudiana, commonly known as white elderberry, is a species of flowering plant in the family Viburnaceae and is endemic to eastern Australia. It is a perennial shrub but with stems that are produced annually with pinnate leaves that have three to eleven leaflets, small white flowers and small but edible fruit. It grows in cool forest and shady gorges.

== Description ==
Sambucus gaudichaudiana is a shrub that typically grows to a height of 1–2 m (3 ft 3 in – 6 ft 7 in) from a perennial rootstock but with grooved stems that are renewed each year. The leaves are pinnate, mostly 100–350 mm (3.9–13.8 in) long and sessile with three to eleven narrow lance-shaped to egg-shaped leaflets mostly 30–50 mm (1.2–2.0 in) long and 10–60 mm (0.39–2.36 in) wide with serrated or lobed edges. The flowers are borne in corymb-like groups 8–20 mm (0.31–0.79 in) in diameter, with three or four glabrous, egg-shaped sepals about 1 mm (0.039 in) long and white petals 2–5 mm (0.079–0.197 in) long. Flowering mainly occurs from October to February and the fruit is an edible, white, oval to spherical drupe about 5 mm (0.20 in) long.

== Taxonomy ==
Sambucus gaudichaudiana was first formally described in 1830 by de Candolle in his book Prodromus Systematis Naturalis Regni Vegetabilis.

== Distribution and habitat ==
White elderberry mainly grows in forest, usually in moist or shady sites in south-eastern Queensland, eastern New South Wales as far west as Warren, the Australian Capital Territory, the southern half of Victoria, in Tasmania and the far south-eastern corner of South Australia.

== Use as food ==
The berries of S. gaudichaudiana are edible, juicy, slightly sour and pleasant and can be eaten raw or cooked.
