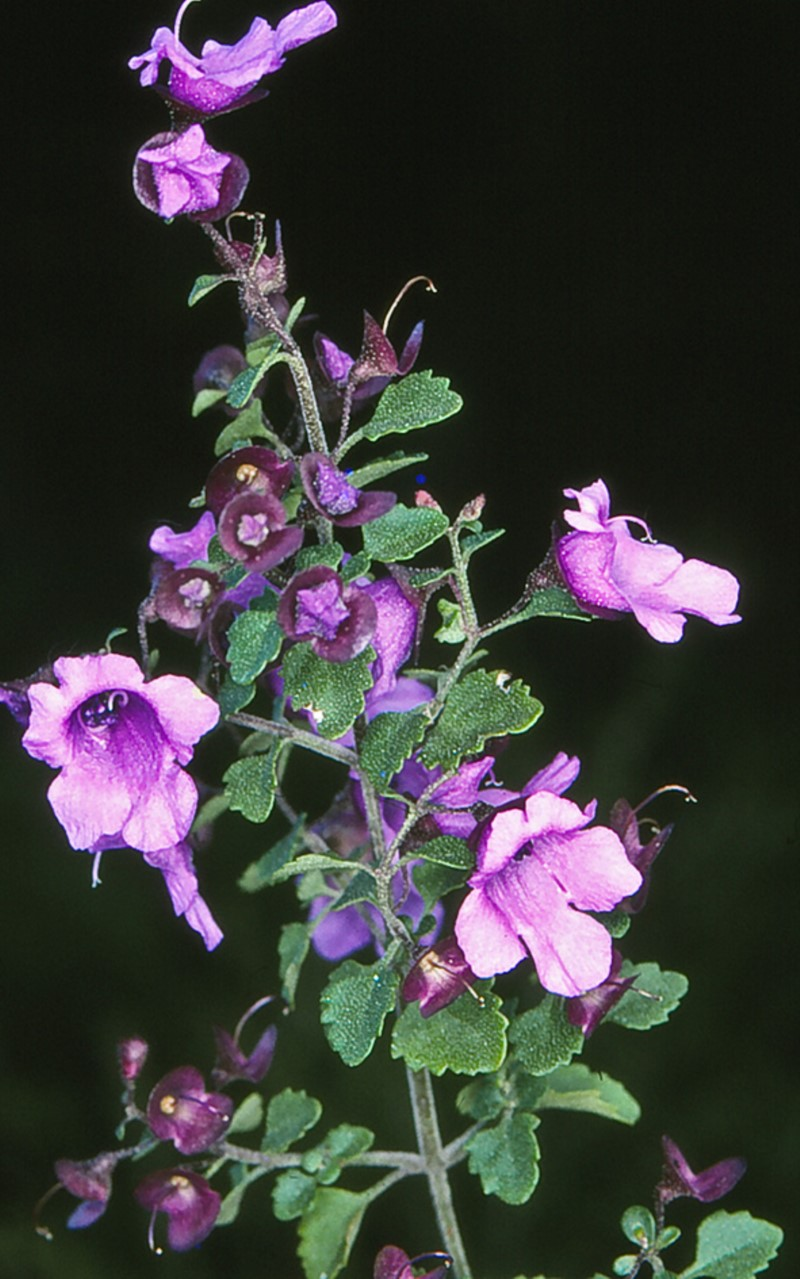
- Near Bega

Scientific classification
- Kingdom: Plantae
- Clade: Tracheophytes
- Clade: Angiosperms
- Clade: Eudicots
- Clade: Asterids
- Order: Lamiales
- Family: Lamiaceae
- Genus: Prostanthera
- Species: P. incisa

Binomial name
- Prostanthera incisa R.Br.
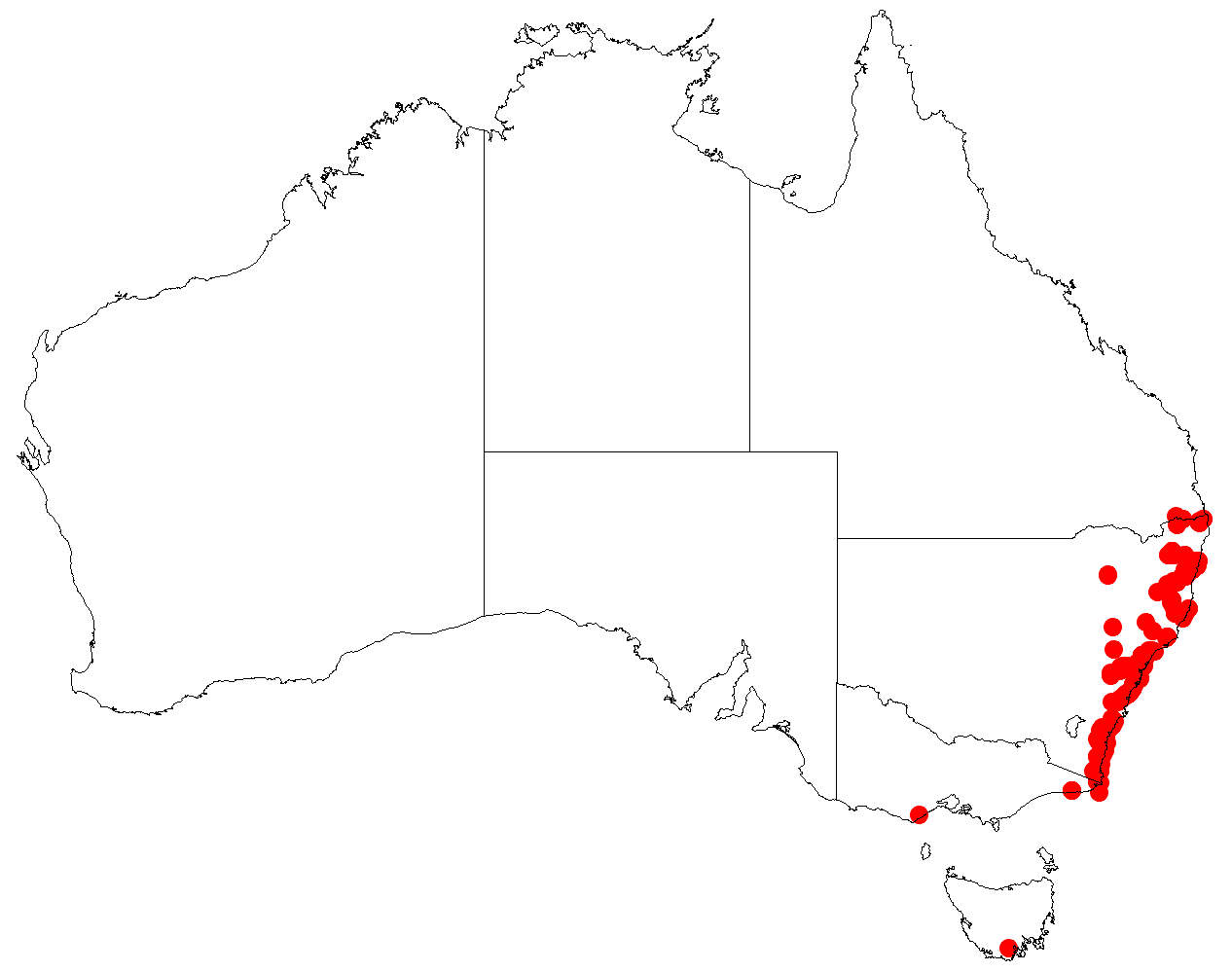
- Occurrence data from AVH

Synonyms
- List: Prostanthera incisa Benth. nom. inval., pro syn.; Prostanthera incisa R.Br. var. incisa; Prostanthera incisa var. pubescens F.Muell. ex Benth.; Prostanthera incisa var. sieberi (Benth.) C.Moore & Betche; Prostanthera sieberi Benth.; Prostanthera sp. aff. melissifolia; Prostanthera violacea auct. non R.Br.: Ewart, A.J. (1931); Prostanthera violacea var. albiflora auct. non Benth.: Ewart, A.J. (1931)

= Prostanthera incisa =

Cut-leaved mint-bush

Species of flowering plant

Prostanthera incisa, commonly known as cut-leaf mint-bush or native thyme, is a species of flowering plant in the family Lamiaceae and is endemic to south-eastern continental Australia. It is an erect, strongly aromatic, openly branched shrub with hairy, densely glandular branches, egg-shaped to oblong leaves, and pale mauve to mauve flowers.

== Description ==
Prostanthera incisa is an erect, openly-branched shrub that typically grows to a height of 0.5–3 m (1 ft 8 in – 9 ft 10 in) and 2–3 m (6 ft 7 in – 9 ft 10 in) wide. It is a "strongly and rather unpleasantly" aromatic shrub or has a "pleasing aroma emanating from the sensitive leaf glands" according to George Althofer. The shrub has ridged, hairy, densely glandular branches. The leaves are hairy, densely glandular, egg-shaped to oblong, paler on the lower surface, 8–30 mm (0.31–1.18 in) long and 4–12 mm (0.16–0.47 in) wide on a petiole 1–10 mm (0.039–0.394 in) long. The edges of the leaves are coarsely toothed and the tip is rounded. The flowers are arranged in bunches near the end of the branches with bracteoles about 1 mm (0.039 in) long but that fall off as the flower develops. The sepals are 3–4.5 mm (0.12–0.18 in) long, forming a tube about 2 mm (0.079 in) long with two lobes, the upper lobe about 2 mm (0.079 in) long. The petals are pale mauve to mauve and 7–10 mm (0.28–0.39 in) long.

== Taxonomy ==
Prostanthera incisa was first formally described in 1810 by Robert Brown in his book Prodromus Florae Novae Hollandiae et Insulae Van Diemen, and it still bears its original name.

== Distribution and habitat ==
Cut-leaved mint-bush is found along the New South Wales coastline from Mount Warning near the Queensland border all the way to Victoria, as well as on the Central Tablelands of New South Wales. It is found in sheltered sites in rainforest margins or sclerophyll forest under such trees as Sydney blue gum (Eucalyptus saligna), cabbage gum (E. amplifolia), Sydney peppermint (E. piperita), red bloodwood (Corymbia gummifera) or turpentine (Syncarpia glomulifera). It can also occur in scrub along watercourses in association with river she-oak (Casuarina cunninghamiana).

== Use in horticulture ==
First grown in England in 1824, P. incisa var. incisa is cultivated on a small-scale commercial basis for essential oil production and for bushfood spice. P. incisa prefers sheltered sites in well-drained acidic soils, and in poorly drained soils it can be susceptible to root-rot. It has reasonable frost tolerance down to −5 °. It is a fast-growing shrub, and consequently can be harvested within the first year. When pruned back to a height of 50 cm it reshoots readily.

Propagation is by seed or cutting material of firm young growth.
