= Dining Downunder =

- Created by: Vic Cherikoff
- Starring: Benjamin Christie; Vic Cherikoff; Mark McCluskey
- Country of origin: Australia
- No. of episodes: 13

Production
- Running time: approx 21 – 23 minutes

Original release
- Network: ABC Asia Pacific
- Release: 2004 – 2006

Dining Downunder is an Australian cooking show hosted by celebrity chefs – Vic Cherikoff (Executive Producer and show host), Benjamin Christie and Mark McCluskey. The series began airing in 2004 on the ABC Asia Pacific, and ended its run in 2006.
