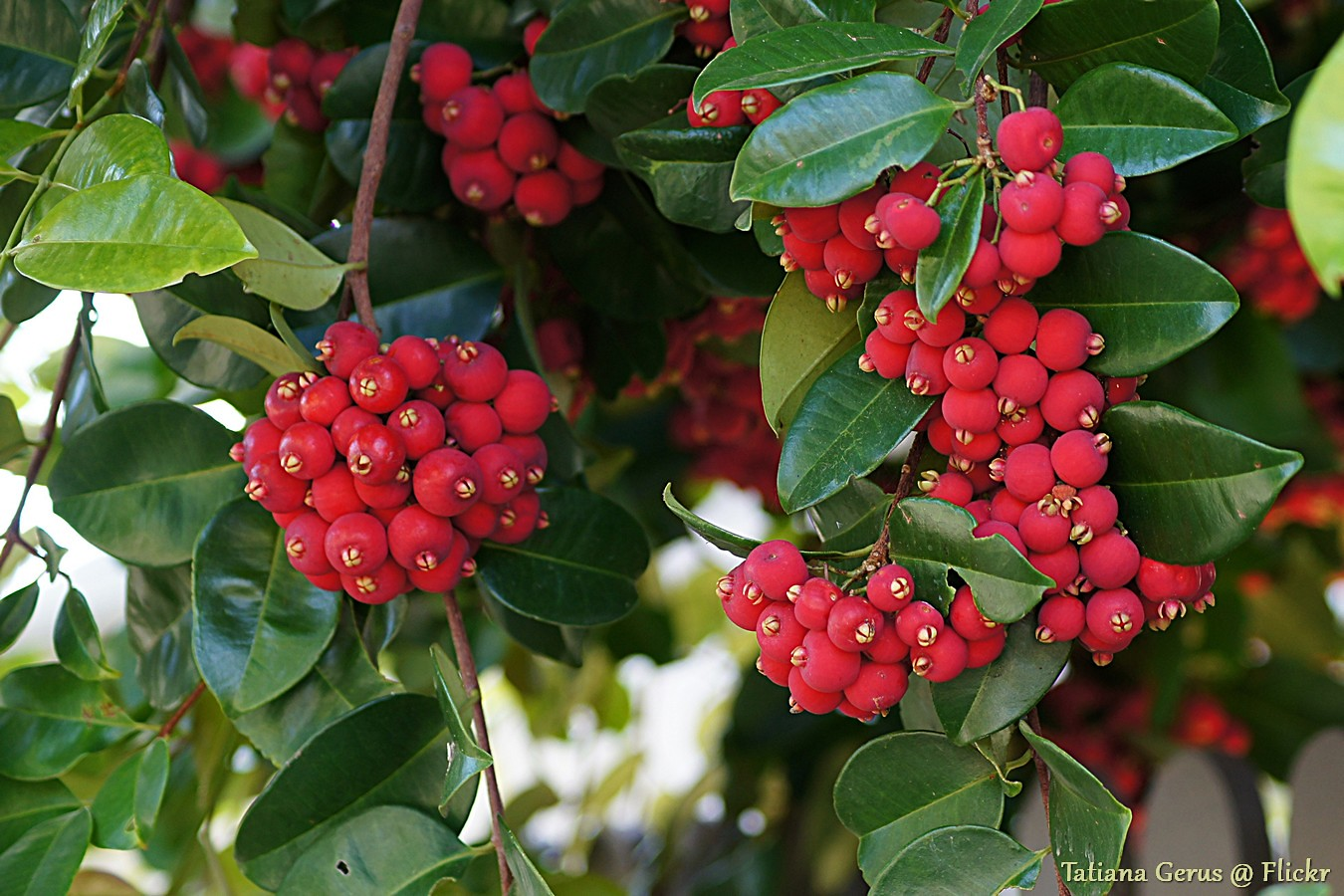

Conservation status
- Data Deficient (IUCN 3.1)
- Least Concern (NCA)

Scientific classification
- Kingdom: Plantae
- Clade: Tracheophytes
- Clade: Angiosperms
- Clade: Eudicots
- Clade: Rosids
- Order: Myrtales
- Family: Myrtaceae
- Genus: Syzygium
- Species: S. fibrosum

Binomial name
- Syzygium fibrosum (F.M.Bailey) T.G.Hartley & L.M.Perry

Synonyms
- Eugenia fibrosa F.M.Bailey

= Syzygium fibrosum =

Species of tree in the myrtle family

Syzygium fibrosum is a species of trees native to rainforest, monsoon forest, and gallery forest of New Guinea and northern Australia. Common names include small red apple, (Bamaga) fibrous satinash and apricot satinash.

== Description ==
Leaves are opposite, smooth, leathery, elliptic, and measure up to 11 cm (4.3 in) long and 5.5 cm (2.2 in) wide. The flowers are cream with numerous stamens. The pink or red fruit have a flattened globular shape and are about 2 cm (0.79 in) wide, containing a singular seed.

== Uses ==
The tree is cultivated to a limited extent for its sour fruit, which are used in jams and confectionery.
