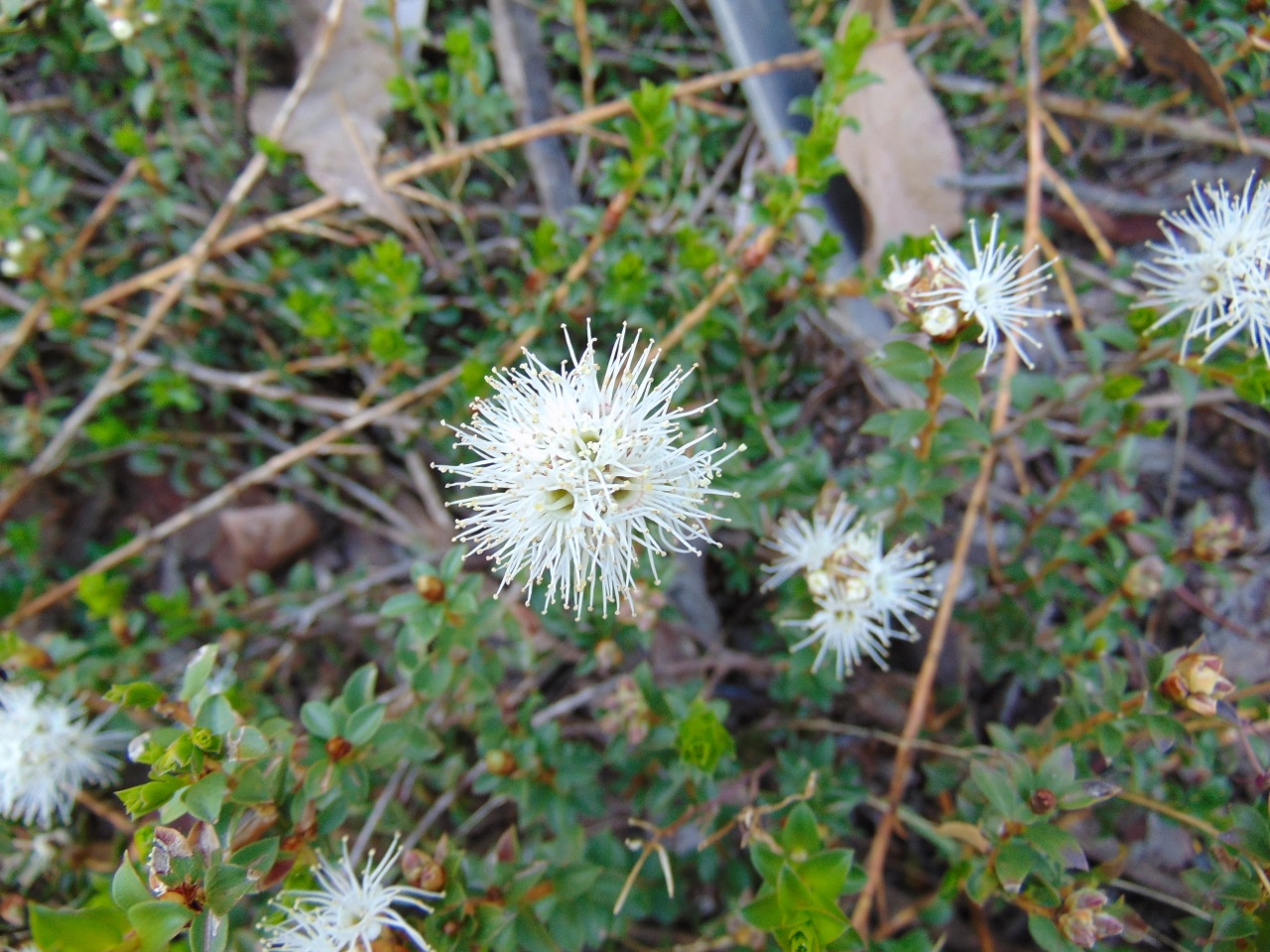
- Kunzea pomifera in the ANBG

Scientific classification
- Kingdom: Plantae
- Clade: Embryophytes
- Clade: Tracheophytes
- Clade: Angiosperms
- Clade: Eudicots
- Clade: Rosids
- Order: Myrtales
- Family: Myrtaceae
- Genus: Kunzea
- Species: K. pomifera

Binomial name
- Kunzea pomifera F.Muell.

= Kunzea pomifera =

Muntries

Species of plant

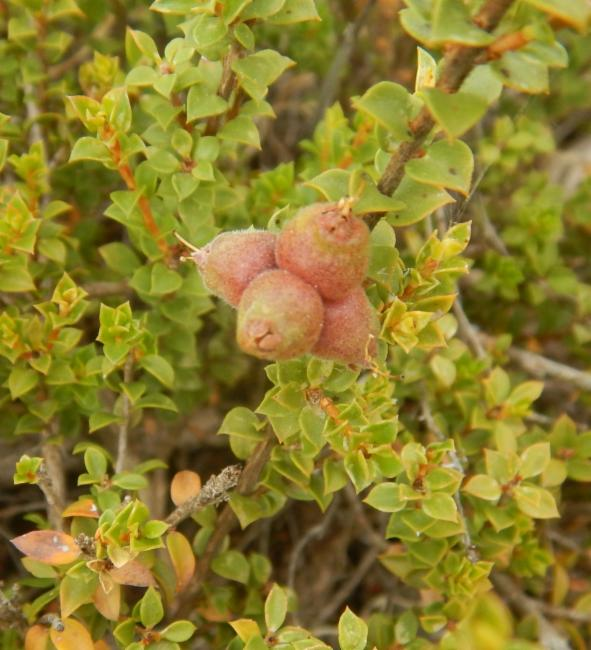
Fruit

Kunzea pomifera, commonly known as muntries, emu apples, native cranberries, munthari, muntaberry or monterry (from Tanganekald Ngarrindjeri mantari), is a flowering plant in the myrtle family, Myrtaceae and is endemic to the south-east of continental Australia. It is a low-growing or prostrate shrub with hairy stems, small, mostly egg-shaped leaves, groups of white flowers on the ends of the branches and fleshy, more or less spherical, edible fruit.

== Description ==
Kunzea pomifera is a low-growing or prostrate shrub with hairy young stems, and that often develops roots along its main branches. Its leaves are arranged alternately and are egg-shaped to elliptic or almost round with a downturned point on the end. The leaves are 3–8 mm (0.1–0.3 in) long, 3–6 mm (0.1–0.2 in) wide on a petiole 0.5–1.5 mm (0.02–0.06 in) long. The flowers are white to cream-coloured, arranged in groups of mainly between three and eight near the ends of the main branches. There are oblong to more or less round bracts covered with silky hairs at the base of the flowers and almost reaching the top of the floral cup. The sepals are brown, triangular and 1.5–2 mm (0.06–0.08 in) long. The petals are egg-shaped to almost round, 1–2 mm (0.04–0.08 in) long. The stamens are white and 4–7 mm (0.2–0.3 in) long and the style is 5–9 mm (0.2–0.4 in) long. The fruit is fleshy, more or less spherical, 8–12 mm (0.3–0.5 in) in diameter, deep red to purple or black when mature.

== Taxonomy and naming ==
Kunzea pomifera was first formally described in 1855 by Ferdinand von Mueller from specimens collected "on the sandy shores and on rocks at St. Vincent's Gulf and Rivoli Bay. The description was published in Mueller's book, Definitions of rare or hitherto undescribed Australian plants. The specific epithet (pomifera) is derived from the Latin words pomum meaning "fruit of any kind" or "apple" and fero meaning "to cover or bear".

== Distribution and habitat ==
Muntries grows in Victoria and South Australia. In Victoria it grows mainly in sandy soil in the Little Desert and Big Desert and small populations between Portland and Nelson. In South Australia it grows in sandy soil, often with limestone, between the Yorke Peninsula and the Victorian border.

== Uses ==
The berries produced by these plants are about 1 centimetre (0.39 in) in diameter, green with a tinge of red at maturity and have a flavour of a spicy apple. Crunchy in texture, muntries contain up to four times more antioxidants than blueberries and provide natural waxes that are good for skin nourishment.

== Cultivation ==
Kunzea pomifera was grown in England in 1889. It was one of the first species of Australian plant introduced into cultivation in England.

=== Trellising ===
While muntries are a groundcover in the wild, commercial growers have successfully managed to trellis the plants. Trellised muntries allow easier access for harvesting and management. It also allows a more efficient use of orchard space.

Muntrie plants can be trained quite easily through weaving the growing plant through and along trellis wires, using plant ties to secure them.

=== Soil requirements ===
Muntries seem to prefer well drained soil of a moderately acid to strongly alkaline pH (6.0–8.0).

=== Water requirements ===
Natural rainfall levels of wild populations range from 500–800 millimetres (20–31 in). For cultivation it is suggested that waterlogging and extremely dry soils should both be avoided. Moderate restriction of water in the early spring may be beneficial in stimulating flowering and reducing competitive vegetative growth.

Anecdotal evidence suggests that overwatering muntries may result in a dilution of flavour in the muntrie berries.
