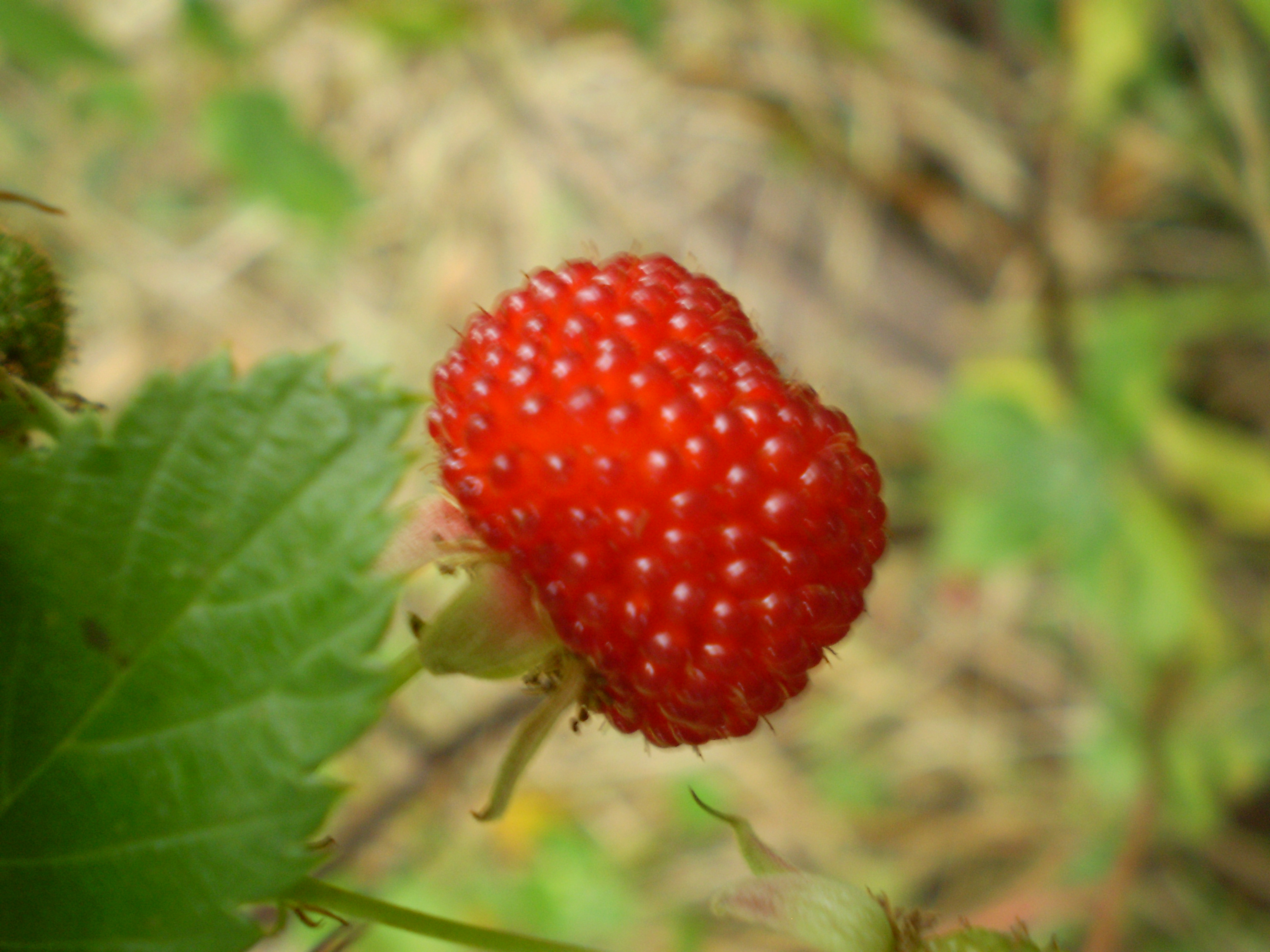

Conservation status
- Least Concern (NCA)

Scientific classification
- Kingdom: Plantae
- Clade: Embryophytes
- Clade: Tracheophytes
- Clade: Spermatophytes
- Clade: Angiosperms
- Clade: Eudicots
- Clade: Rosids
- Order: Rosales
- Family: Rosaceae
- Genus: Rubus
- Species: R. probus

Binomial name
- Rubus probus L.H.Bailey

Synonyms
- Rubus mueller F.M.Bailey; Rubus oigocladus proles muelleri (Lefèvre) Boulay

= Rubus probus =

Atherton raspberry

Species of flowering plant

Rubus probus, commonly known as Atherton raspberry or wild raspberry, is a species of plant in the rose family Rosaceae. It has edible fruit and is native to Queensland, Australia, and nearby islands.

== Description ==
Rubus probus is a scrambling, non-woody shrub growing to about 2 m (6 1/2 ft) high, and has recurved thorns on the undersides of leaves and twigs. The leaves are compound, with five ovate leaflets that are up to 10 cm (4 in) long and 5 cm (2 in) wide. The terminal leaflet is usually larger than the others, and they all have deeply toothed margins.

Flowers are bisexual (i.e. they have both functional stamens and functional carpels) and have five pale green sepals and five white petals. The fruit is an aggregate fruit, composed of numerous small drupes, and they grow up to 15 mm (0.6 in) long and 20 mm (0.8 in) wide. The fruit is edible.

Atherton raspberry is a rampant grower and, like most Rubus species, can form dense thorny thickets.

=== Phenology ===
Flowering and fruiting occurs from April to December.

== Distribution and habitat ==
In Australia the species has been recorded along the Queensland coastal areas from Brisbane as far north as the Daintree National Park, and the Australasian Virtual Herbarium also has records from Bougainville Island. In addition to this, the Global Biodiversity Information Facility includes Papua New Guinea in the species' range and the Australian Tropical Rainforest Plants identification key states that the species also occurs in Malesia.

The plant is favoured by disturbance, and grows in rainforest at altitudes from sea level to about 1,100 m (3,600 ft).

== Taxonomy ==
The plant was first described as Rubus muelleri in 1884 by Frederick Manson Bailey, based on a collection of material from Helidon in southern Queensland, "near waterfalls".

== Conservation status ==
This species is listed as least concern under the Queensland Government's Nature Conservation Act. As of June 2026, it has not been assessed by the International Union for Conservation of Nature (IUCN).

== Gallery ==
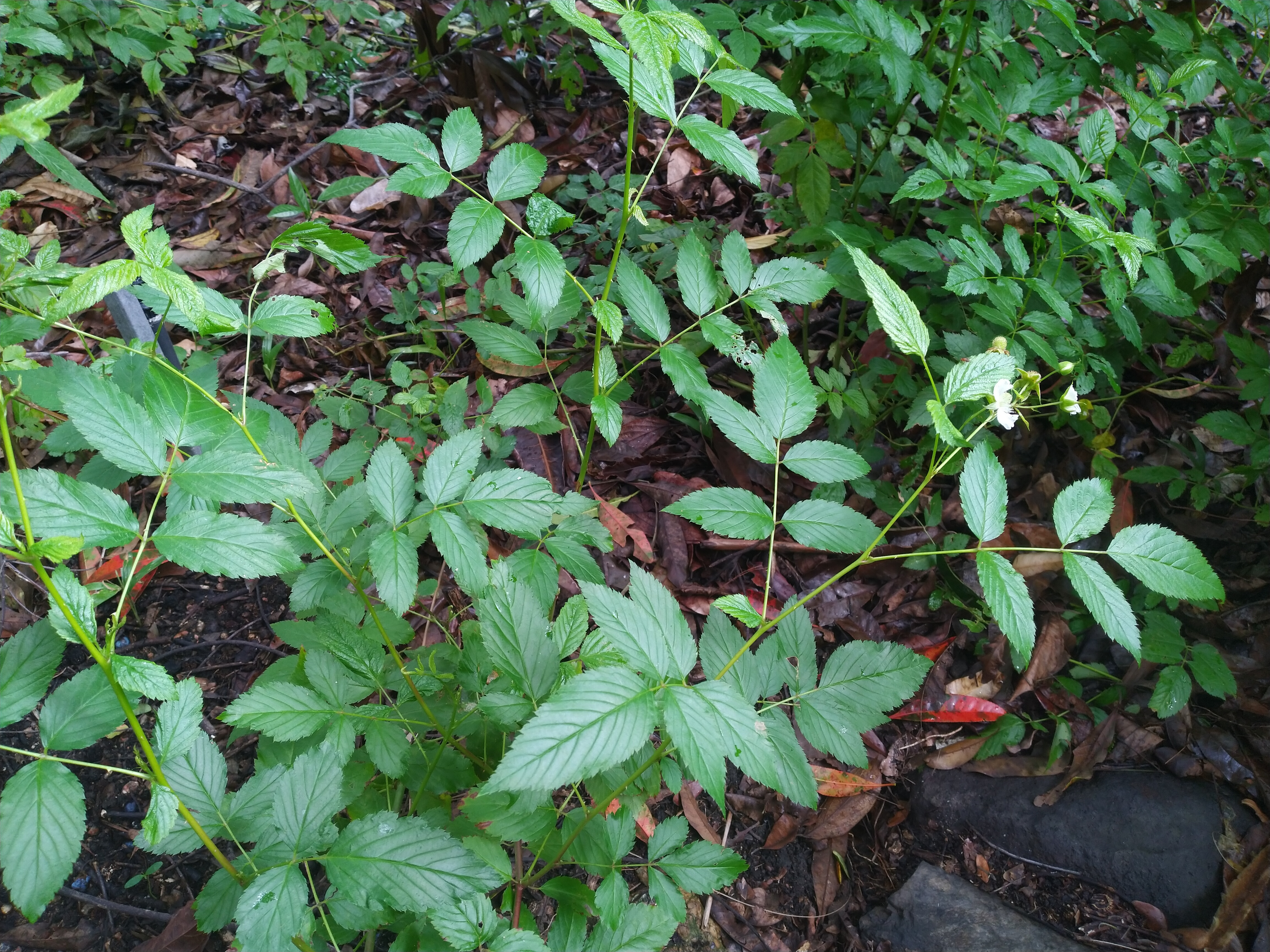
Habit

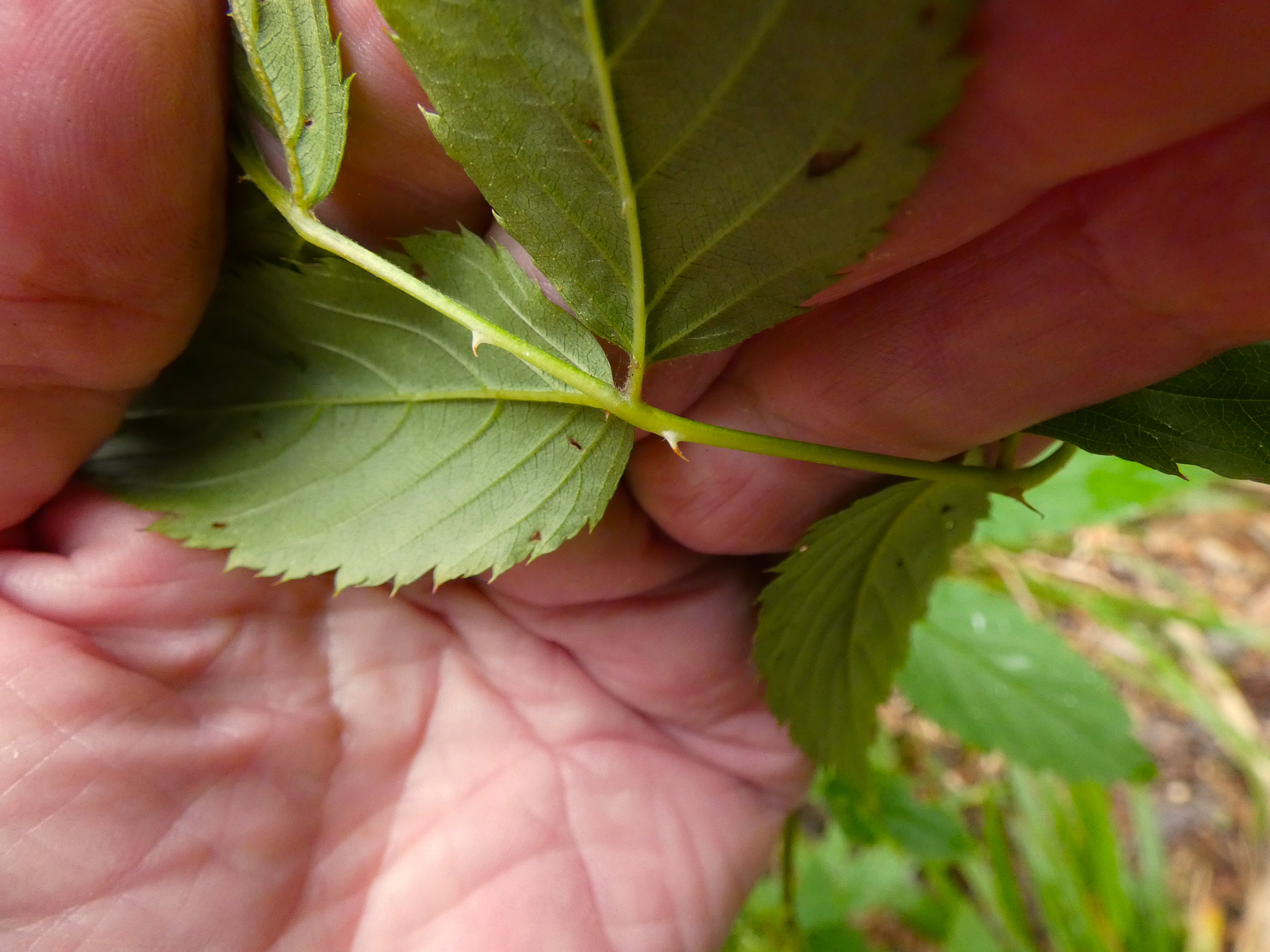
Thorns

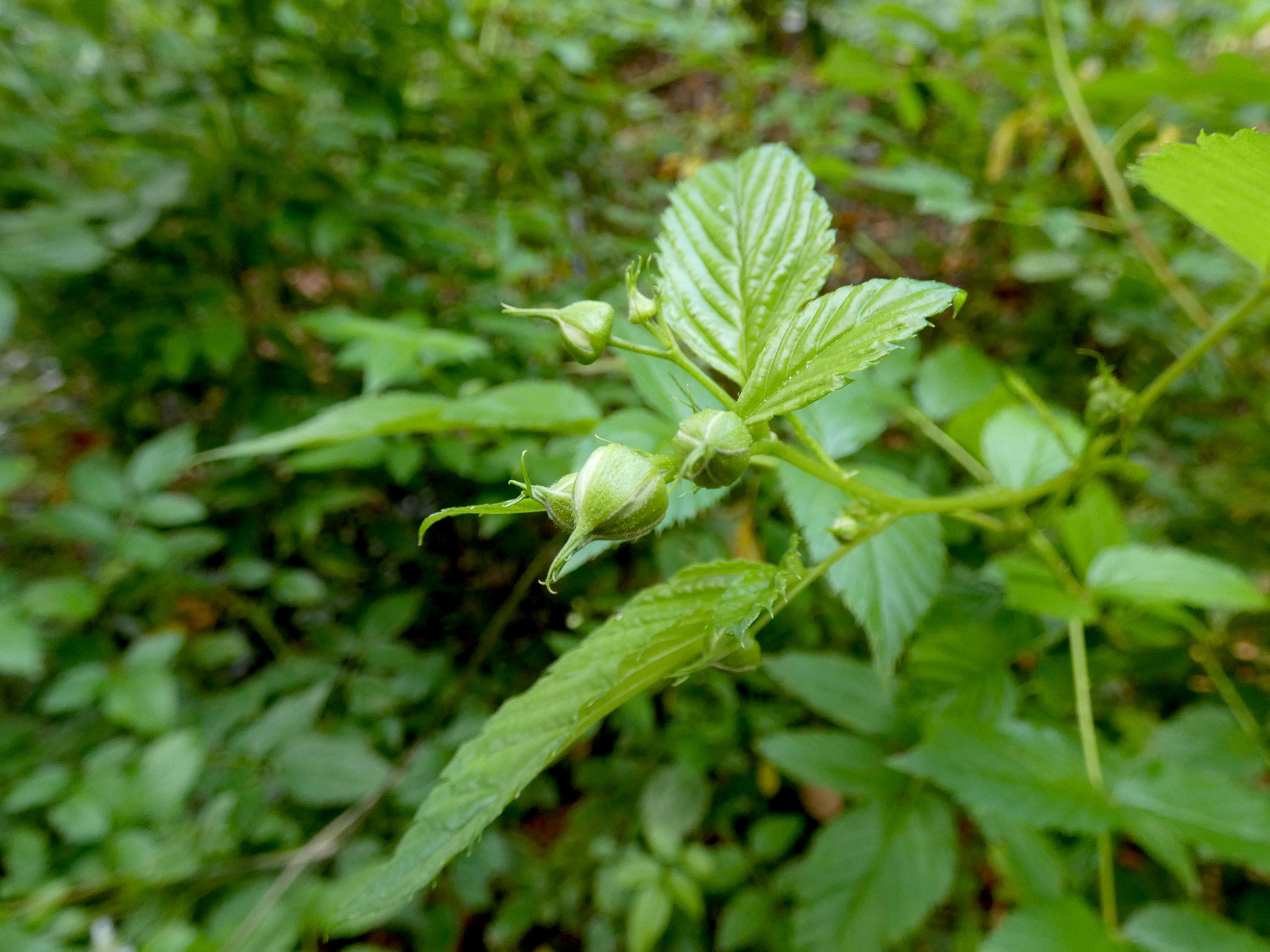
Flower buds

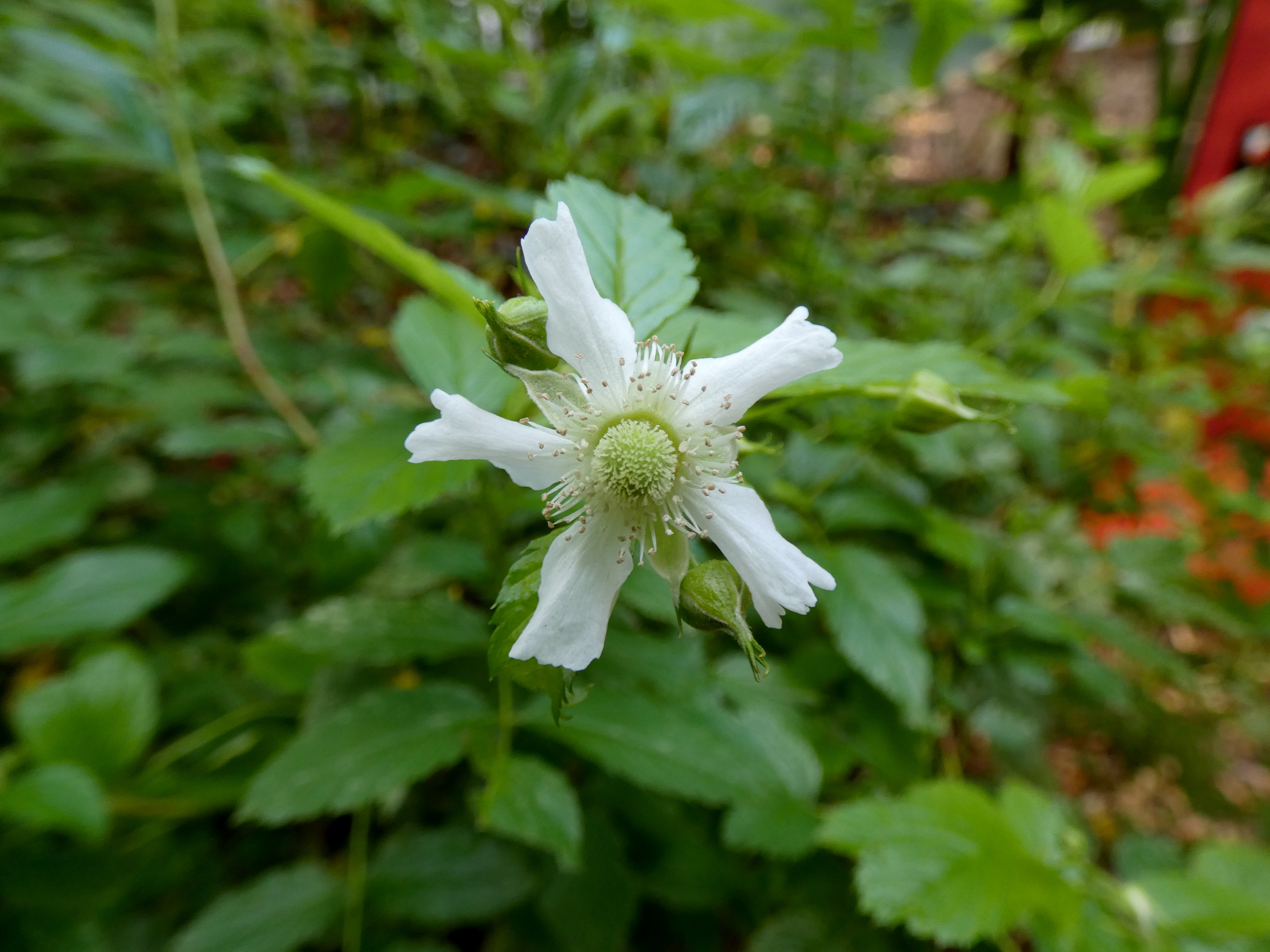
Flower

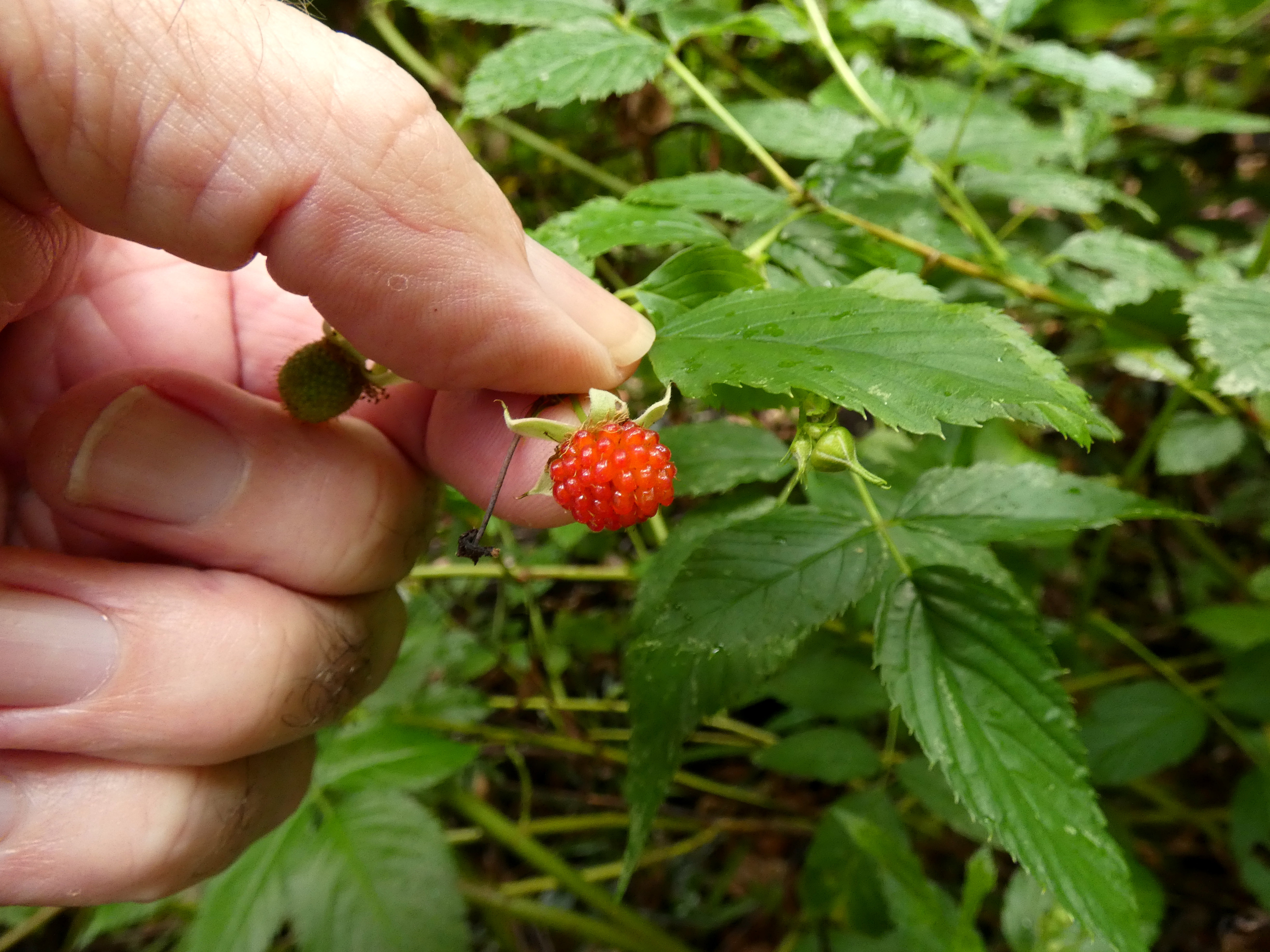
Fruit
