= Syzygium erythrocalyx =

Scientific classification
- Kingdom: Plantae
- Clade: Tracheophytes
- Clade: Angiosperms
- Clade: Eudicots
- Clade: Rosids
- Order: Myrtales
- Family: Myrtaceae
- Genus: Syzygium
- Species: S. erythrocalyx

Binomial name
- Syzygium erythrocalyx (C.T.White) B.Hyland

Species of tree

Syzygium erythrocalyx, commonly known as Johnstone River satinash, is a rainforest tree native to North Queensland, Australia. The tree is up to 30 ft (10 m) in height, with large, broad elliptical leaves to 20 cm long, prominent veined, and red new growth. The edible red fruit is up to 4 cm wide.

It is cultivated in Australia to a limited extent as a feature tree. The edible fruit has a wild apple–like flavour and can be used in preserves, sauces and beverages.
