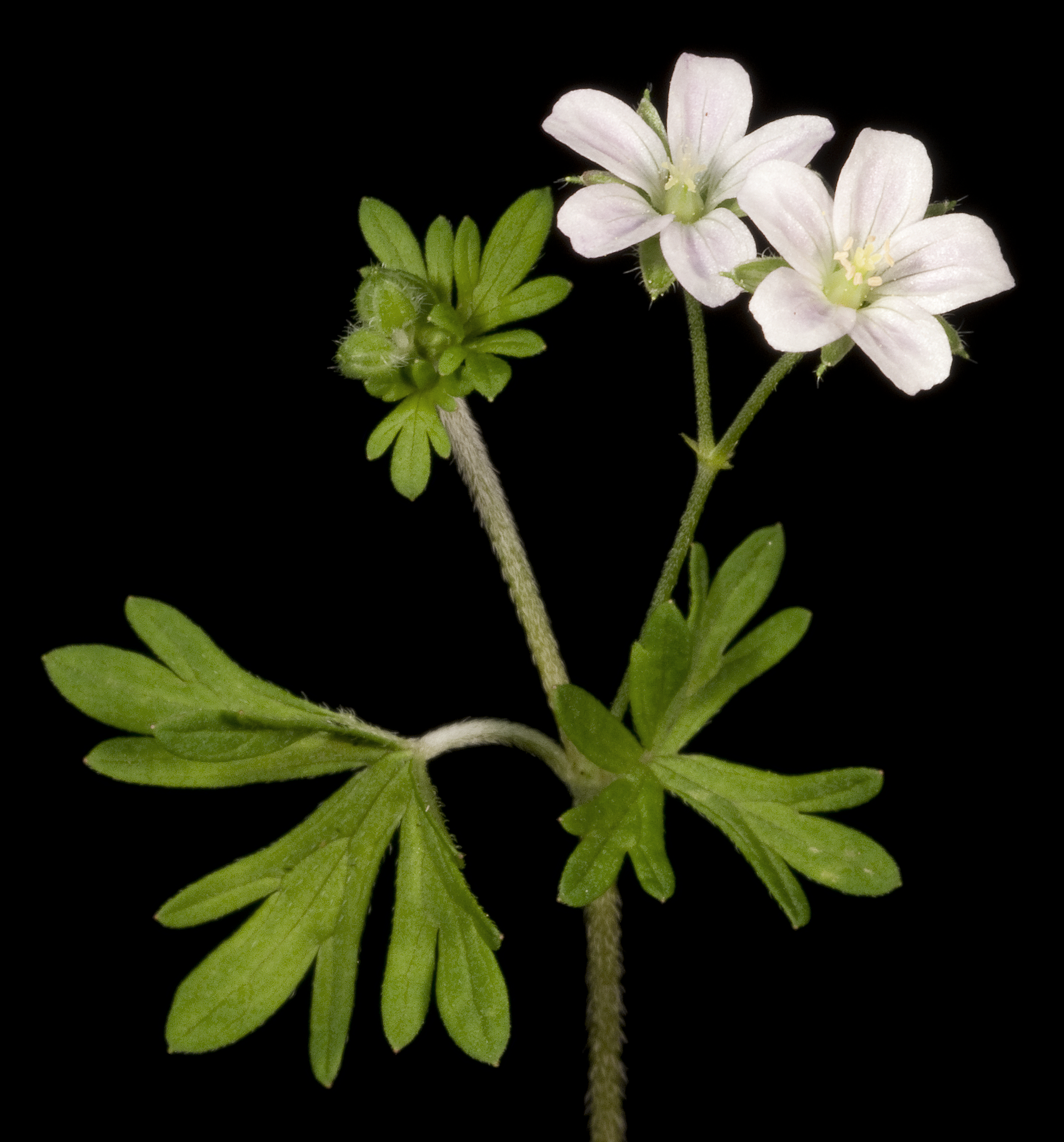

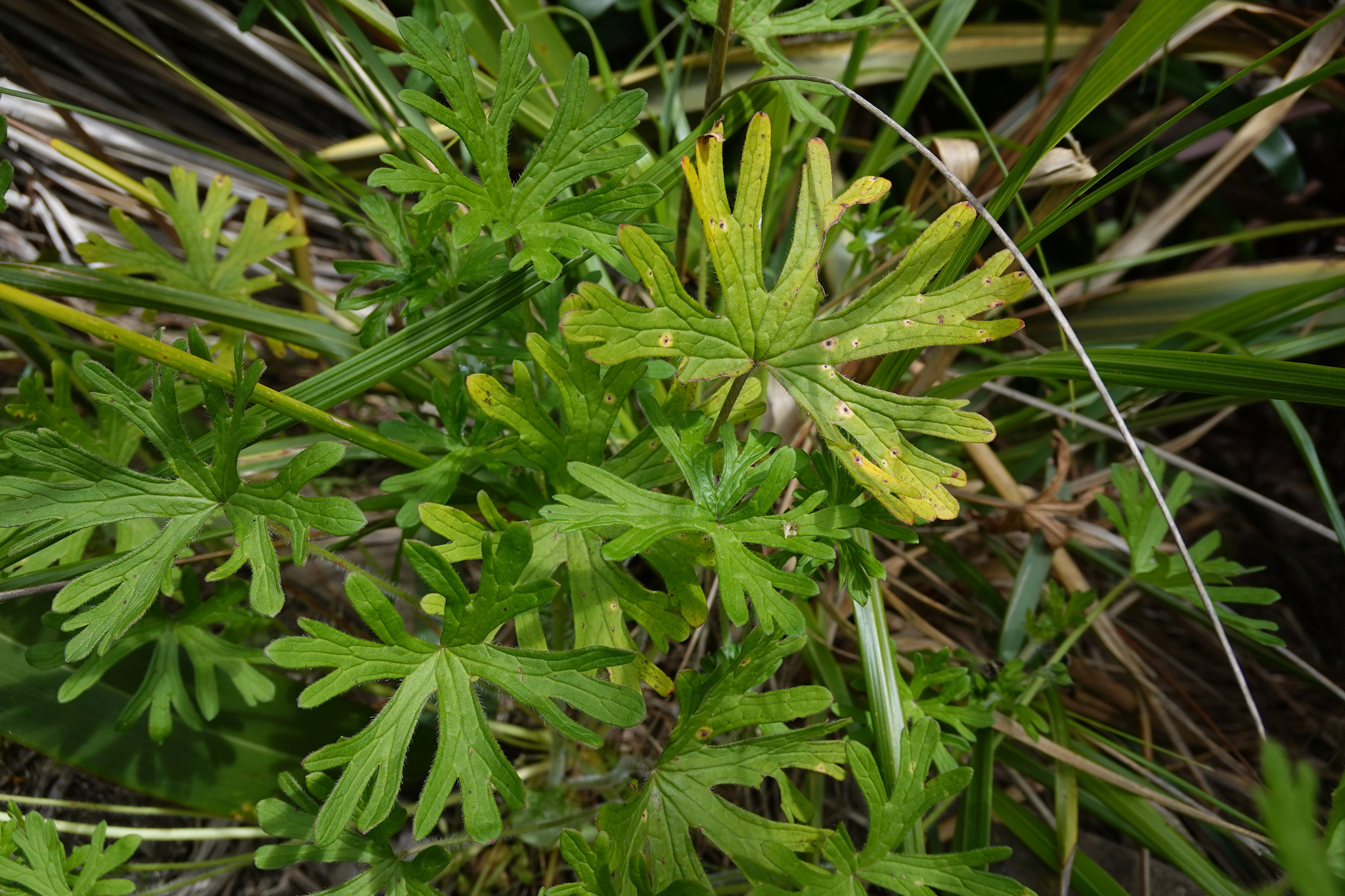

Conservation status
- Declining (NZ TCS)

Scientific classification
- Kingdom: Plantae
- Clade: Tracheophytes
- Clade: Angiosperms
- Clade: Eudicots
- Clade: Rosids
- Order: Geraniales
- Family: Geraniaceae
- Genus: Geranium
- Species: G. solanderi

Binomial name
- Geranium solanderi Carolin

Synonyms
- Geranium carolinianum var. australe (Benth.) Fosberg; Geranium dissectum var. australe Benth. Geranium dissectum var. pilosum Hook.f. Geranium drummondii Carolin; Geranium gardneri de Lange; Geranium patulum Sol. ex G.Forst.

= Geranium solanderi =

Species of flowering plant

Geranium solanderi (common names - native geranium, Australian cranesbill, Austral cranesbill, Cut-leaf cranesbill, native carrot, and hairy geranium) is a species of plant in the family Geraniaceae. It is native to Australia (New South Wales, Queensland, Victoria, South Australia, Western Australia, and Tasmania), and to New Zealand.

It was first described in 1800 by Daniel Solander as Geranium pilosum, from a specimen found in New Zealand. However, the name was illegal (having already been used in 1787 by Antonio José Cavanilles) and it was renamed in 1965 by Roger Charles Carolin, with the species epithet, solanderi, honouring Solander.

== Description ==
Geranium solanderi is a perennial, spreading herb with the ends growing upward. The stemas are up 50 cm long, and coarsely hairy. The taproot is swollen and often like a turnip.

The leaves on the flowering stems are opposite and palmatisect (leaf cut into lobes to up to more than halfway in a palmate form). They are 1–3 cm long by 1.5–5 cm wide, with 5–10 lobes, and hairy on a stalk (petiole) up to 5 cm long.

The flowers are paired (rarely solitary) on an inflorescence stald (peduncle) which is 1–4 cm long, with each flower on a flower stalk (pedicel) which is 2.5–5 cm long. The sepals are 5–9 mm long, and the pink petals are 5–12 mm long, pink and often have yellowish veins. The anthers are yellow. The fruits are 12–25 mm long and the seeds are black.

== Conservation status ==
In New Zealand, in both 2004 and 2009 it was declared "Not threatened", but in 2012, under the New Zealand Threat Classification System it was declared "At Risk - Declining", with the qualifiers SO (safe overseas) and DP (data poor), and this status was reaffirmed in 2017.

== Aboriginal uses ==
The Noongar people of south west Western Australia used the older red tuberous roots (after cooking) to treat diarrhoea.
