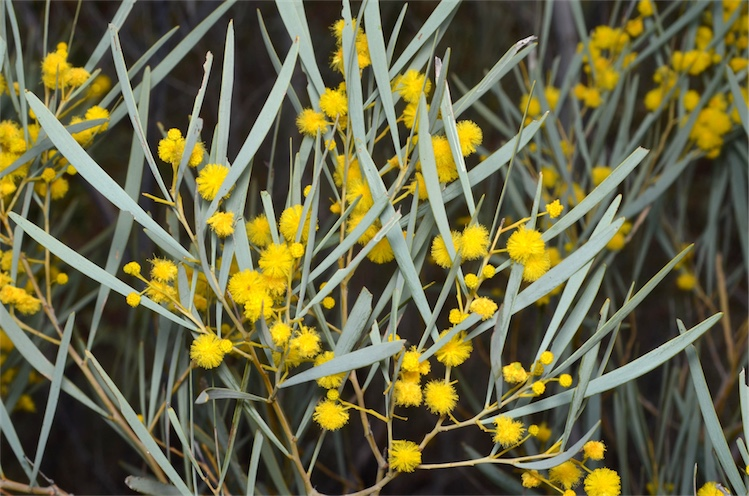
- In West MacDonnell National Park

Scientific classification
- Kingdom: Plantae
- Clade: Tracheophytes
- Clade: Angiosperms
- Clade: Eudicots
- Clade: Rosids
- Order: Fabales
- Family: Fabaceae
- Subfamily: Caesalpinioideae
- Clade: Mimosoid clade
- Genus: Acacia
- Species: A. murrayana

Binomial name
- Acacia murrayana F.Muell. ex Benth.
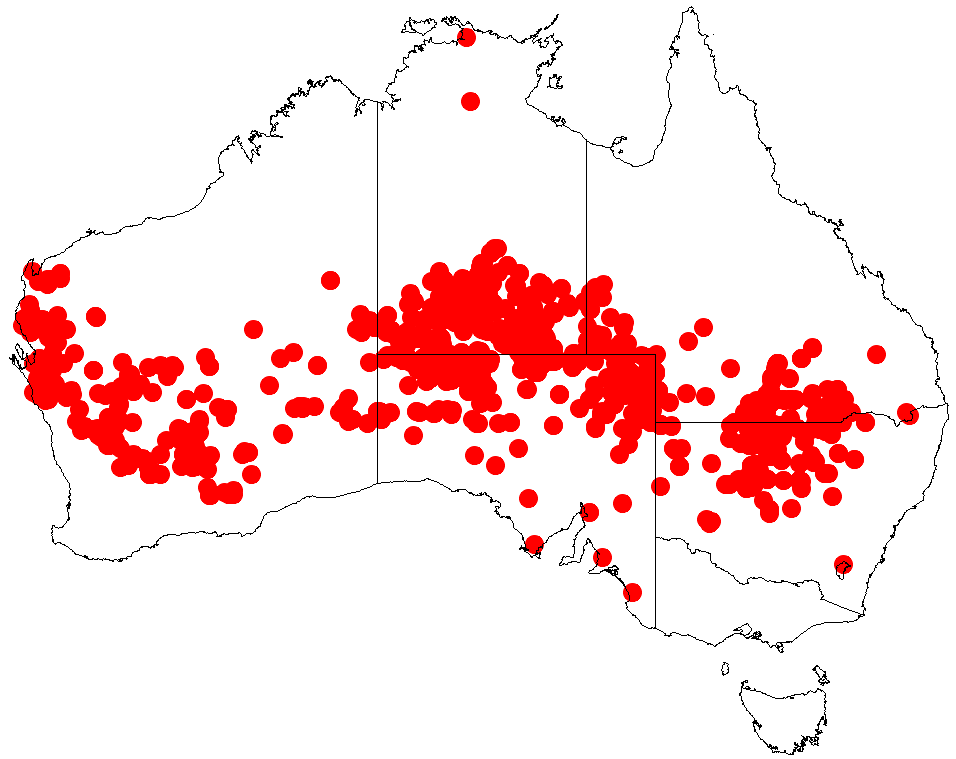
- Occurrence data from AVH

Synonyms
- Acacia frumentacea Tate.; Acacia leptopetala auct.; Racosperma murrayanum (F.Muell. ex Benth.) Pedley

= Acacia murrayana =

Sandplain wattle

Species of legume

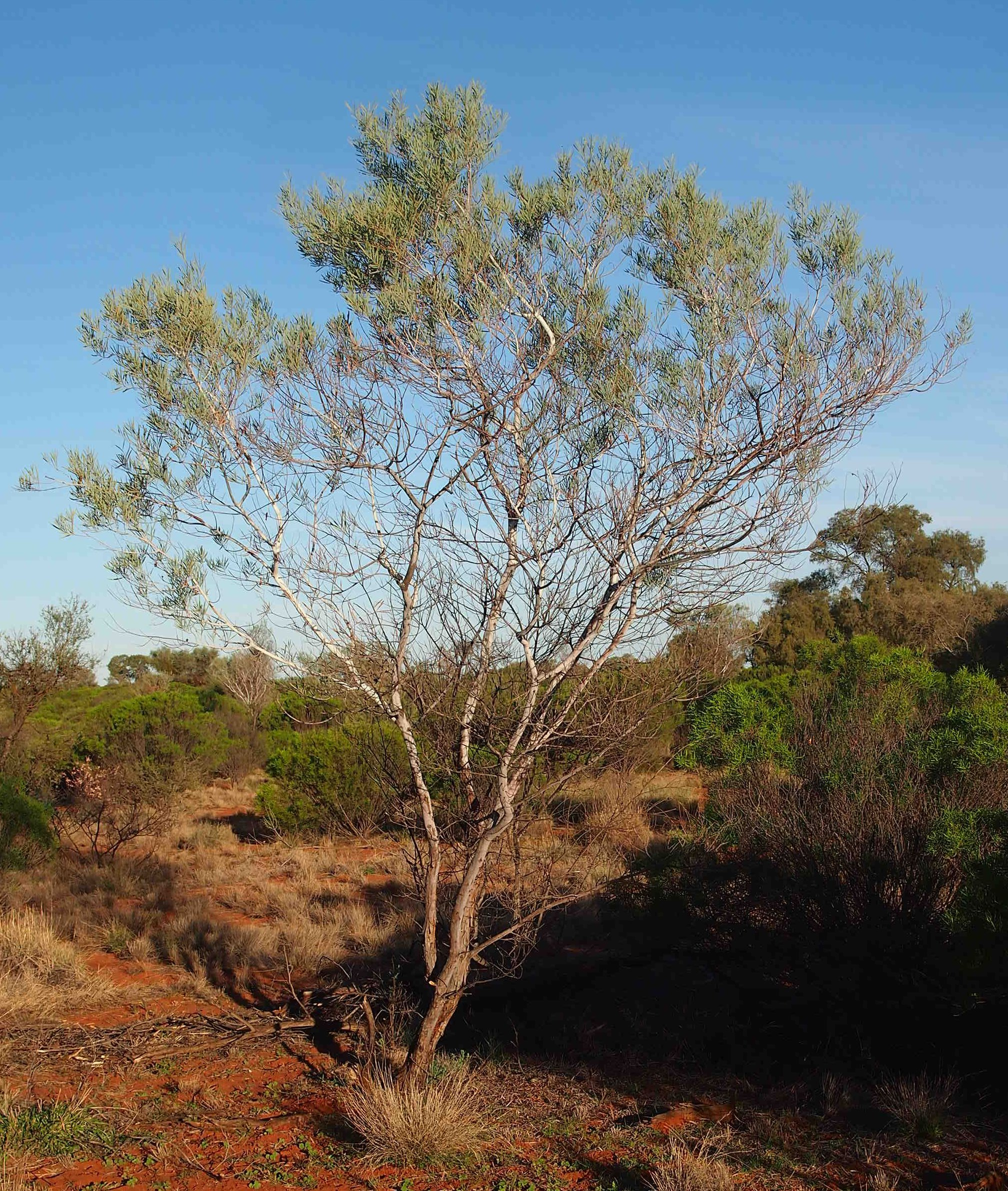
Habit

Acacia murrayana, commonly known as Murray's wattle, sandplain wattle, colony wattle, powder bark wattle or fire wattle, is a species of flowering plant in the family Fabaceae and is endemic to arid areas in every mainland state of Australia except Victoria. It is a shrub or tree with linear to narrowly elliptic phyllodes, spherical heads of light to mid-golden yellow flowers, and narrowly oblong, papery pods prominently rounded over the seeds.

== Description ==
Acacia murrayana is a tall shrub or small tree that typically grows to a height of 2–5 m (6 ft 7 in – 16 ft 5 in) but can grow as tall as 8 m (26 ft) and commonly suckers and forms colonies. Its phyllodes are linear to narrowly elliptic, sometimes lance-shaped with the narrower end towards the base, mostly 50–150 mm (2.0–5.9 in) long, 1.5–8 mm (0.059–0.315 in) wide, thinly leathery, glabrous, pale green to glaucous, with obscure veins. There is a curved point on the tip of the phyllodes, and a gland at the base of the point. The flowers are borne in spherical heads in racemes 10–60 mm (0.39–2.36 in) long, each head on a peduncle 4–10 mm (0.16–0.39 in) long with 25 to 50 densely arranged light to mid-golden yellow flowers. Flowering occurs mainly between August and November, and the pods are narrowly oblong, up to 90 mm (3.5 in) long, 8–12 mm (0.31–0.47 in) wide, papery, sometimes covered with a white powdery bloom, glabrous and prominently rounded over the seeds. The seeds are oblong, elliptic, egg-shaped or round, 4.0–5.5 mm (0.16–0.22 in) wide, dull black and lack an aril.

== Taxonomy ==
Acacia murrayana was first formally described in 1864 by George Bentham in his Flora Australiensis from an unpublished description by Ferdinand von Mueller, from specimens collected by James Patrick Murray (1839–c.1885) from specimens he collected on Howitt's expedition to Cooper's Creek. The specific epithet (murrayana) is "unfortunately attached to at least two plant species".

== Distribution and habitat ==
Murray's wattle is widespread in the arid zone, from Shark Bay and North West Cape in Western Australia, through the Northern Territory and South Australia to the western margin of the Great Divide near Mitchell in Queensland and Narrabri in New South Wales. It grows in sand on dunes, plains or along streams, in mulga or spinifex.

== Uses ==
Most Acacia seeds are highly nutritious with an established history of traditional use by Aboriginal Australians. Because of this, Acacia species have been explored as a neglected and underutilized crop that could be used to improve food security in developing countries. A. murrayana has been suggested to be one of the most promising species for this purpose. Seeds contain around 26% protein, 26% carbohydrate, 32% fibre, and 9% fat and have a low glycaemic index.

Seeds and gum of the plant is a food source for Central Australian Aboriginal people. Seeds can be ground to make a flour that can be used as a flavouring in desserts, a nutritious supplement in breads and pastries, or for a caffeine-free coffee alternative.

The bark of all Acacia species are high in tannins, making them useful for dyeing.

== Gallery ==
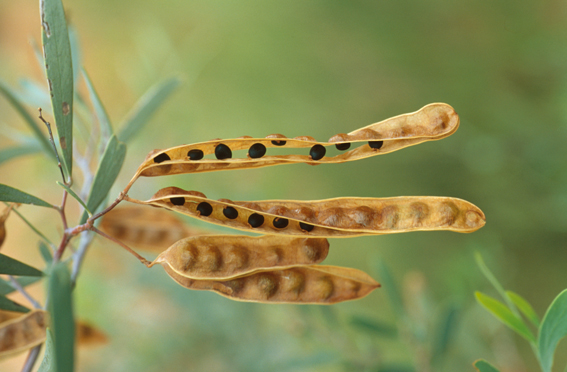

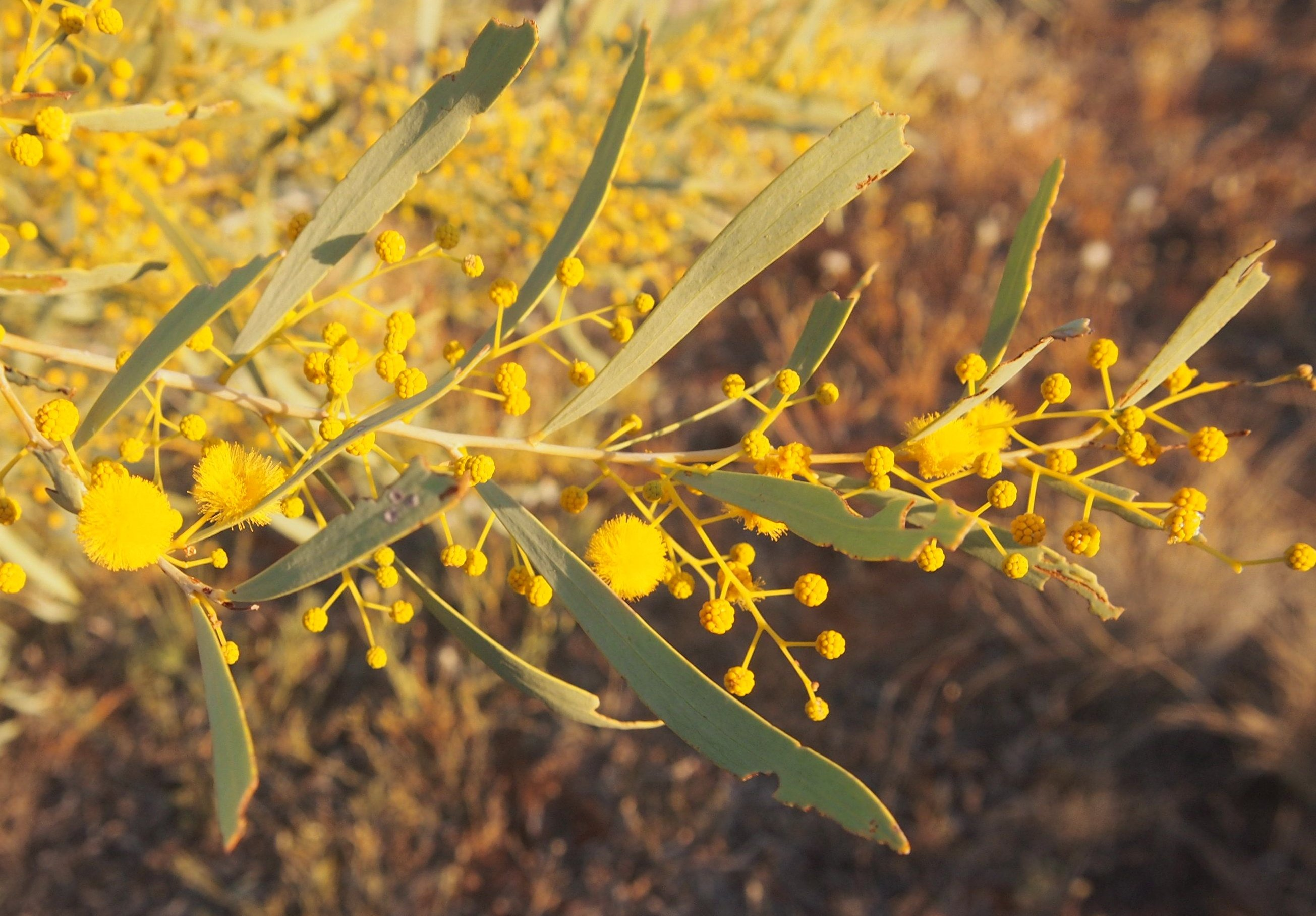

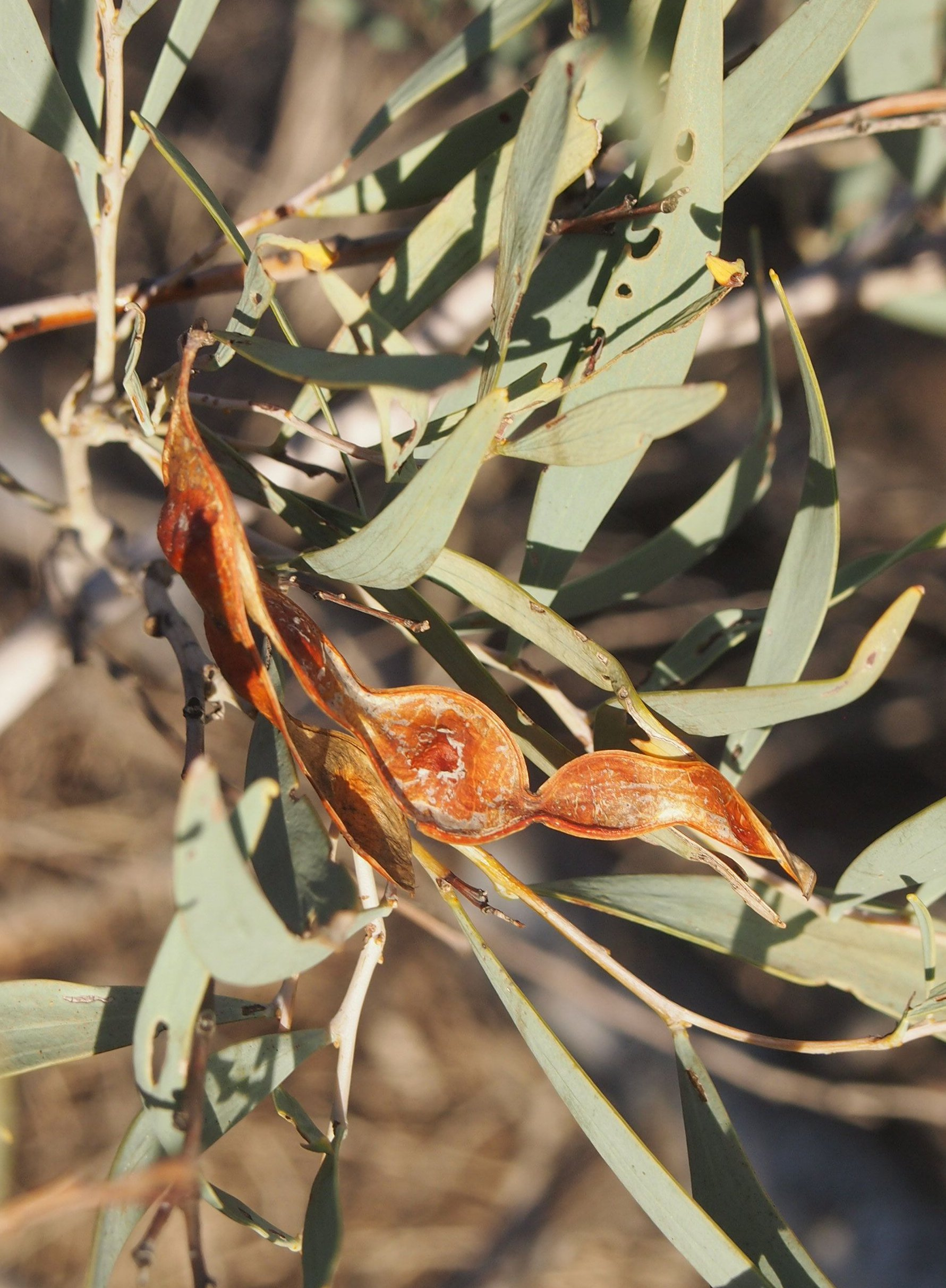

== See also ==
- List of Acacia species
