= History of the bushfood industry =

Aspect of Australian culinary history

The modern Australian native food industry, also called the bushfood industry, had its initial beginnings in the 1970s and early 1980s, when regional enthusiasts and researchers started to target local native species for use as food. Indigenous Australians had been harvesting many species for use as food (bush tucker) and medicines (bush medicine) for millennia. In the mid 1970s Brian Powell recognised the commercial potential of quangdong fruit and began its cultivation in orchards. Following this, the CSIRO became involved in quangdong research.

In the late 1970s, Peter Hardwick began investigating subtropical native plants suitable for commercial cropping, selecting fruit species like riberry, Davidsonia, and later leaf-spices, like lemon myrtle, Aniseed myrtle, and Dorrigo Pepper. Hardwick started targeting strong flavoured species suitable for processing, which later became the main industry strategy. In the 1980s, Hardwick worked in the New South Wales Department of Agriculture, where he met essential oils researcher, Dr Ian Southwell. Southwell played a significant role in providing the essential oil profiles of many of the most popular native spices.

In 1983, the University of Sydney's Human Nutrition Unit, headed by Jennie Brand-Miller, undertook a nutritional analysis programme analysing bushfood for Aboriginal health. Vic Cherikoff, a member of the Human Nutrition Unit team, started-up a wholesale distribution company marketing native Australian ingredients. Cherikoff played a vital role in linking-up the Aboriginal and regional bushfood research with the restaurant and food processing industry. Cherikoff also contributed to Jennifer Isaacs' book, Bush Food and authored The Bushfood Handbook and Uniquely Australian, A wildfood cookbook which publicly defined the emerging industry.

In the mid-1980s, several Australian-themed restaurants opened-up in Sydney. These included Rowntrees: The Australian Restaurant, run by Chef Jean-Paul Bruneteau and Jenny Dowling. In 1996, Bruneteau, Dowling and Cherikoff opened a second restaurant, Riberries – Taste Australia. Edna’s Table restaurant also opened-up and was run by brother and sister team, Chef Raymond Kersh and Jennice Kersh. The Red Ochre Grill in Adelaide opened-up in the early 1990s, with Andrew Fielke as its chef. Fielke also co-founded a production company, Australian Native Produce Industries (ANPI).

Value-added production emerged in the late 1980s, with products marketed via mainstream retailers. Ian and Juleigh Robbins, established a line of processed sauces, jams and dried spice products through Robin's Foods Pty Ltd. Boutique value-added production − such as jams, sauces and beverages – has become increasingly significant in the regional development of native foods.

Small-scale trial commercial production of native food plants started to occur in the late 1980s, especially in northern New South Wales. In 1994, the Rural Industries Research and Development Corporation and Greening Australia co-sponsored a conference on growing bushfoods near Lismore. The 2000 Olympic Games, in Sydney, were targeted by the developing industry as an event for promoting native foods.

Various regionally based industry associations were formed to represent growers in a national process. Government agencies have become increasingly involved with new native crop development. CSIRO researcher, Dr Stephen Sykes, developed a range of native Citrus hybrids which became available through ANPI.

Since 2000, the industry has continued to consolidate, with a growing overseas market for produce and greater refinement in production methods to supply the demand. Some new products have been introduced, including Finger Lime, mintbush and Eucalyptus olida. However, while the rate of introduction of new native food-plant species has slowed since the early period of the industries conception in the 1980s, the marketing of herb and spice blends, fruit mixtures and functional extracts has grown, potentially leading the industry into new and larger market segments.

Some crops initially associated mainly with bushfood, such as lemon myrtle, have since broadened to also become associated with essential oils and cosmetics.

== See also ==
- Wildcrafting
