= Peter Hardwick =

Australian horticulturist

Peter Hardwick (born 1958) is an Australian food horticulturist and environmentalist, recognized as an early pioneer of the Australian bushfood industry. He publicly challenged the established belief that native Australian food plants were not suitable for cropping; conceived the commercial strategy of processing strong flavored native food plants; and, developed the use of wild and seedling genetic diversity to overcome the lack of domesticated varieties previously considered a limitation with Australian native food plants.

In 1977 Hardwick started researching native food plants for their culinary and cropping potential to highlight the economic importance of conserving rainforest. In 1978, he studied at Ryde School Horticulture, and investigated potential crops like Davidsonia, riberry, bunya nut and plum pine (Illawarra plum).

During the 1980s Hardwick worked for NSW Agriculture. In 1988 he founded Wilderness Foods Ltd, a bushfood company which pioneered the selection and production of aromatic Australian spices; planted mixed species cultivation trials; and worked with local Aboriginal communities on developing native food enterprise. In cooperation with the Essential Oils Unit, Wollongbar Agricultural Institute, Hardwick screened native essential oil plants for potential as Australian spices in the developing bushfood market. This included riberry, lemon myrtle, aniseed myrtle, Cinnamon Myrtle, Lemon Ironbark, and Dorrigo Pepper.

Hardwick has authored several papers on native food plants, and works as a wild food researcher and forager.
