= Jean-Paul Bruneteau =

French-Australian chef and author

Jean-Paul Bruneteau (born 1956) is a French-Australian chef and author who was an early figure in the development of an Australian cuisine based on indigenous ingredients.

Born in 1956 in Vendee, France, Bruneteau migrated to Australia with his parents in 1967. Bruneteau became Chief Cook on the MV Australian Venture. He then worked in the kitchens of the Sydney Opera House. In 1984 he opened Rowntrees, The Australian Restaurant, in Hornsby, Sydney, with business partner Jennifer Dowling. It was the first 'Australian' restaurant listed in the Yellow Pages.

Bruneteau experimented with various native ingredients supplied by small-scale regional suppliers and wholesalers of bushfoods. This included products like riberry, Dorrigo Pepper, tetragon (warrigal greens), lemon myrtle, Wattleseed and Illawarra plum.

In 1988, Bruneteau won a gold medal for 'The Most Original Cuisine' at the Second International Cooking Festival held in Tokyo, Japan where he created his signature dish, now world-famous 'The Rolled Wattleseed Pavlova', developed with the assistance of the Australian Egg Corporation (now defunct).

In 1989, when visiting Australia, French Master Chef, Paul Bocuse paid tribute to Bruneteau's role in developing an Australian cuisine.

In 1991, Bruneteau and Dowling opened Riberries - Taste Australia restaurant, in Darlinghurst, Sydney. In 1996, Bruneteau published many of his ideas and culinary experiences with bushfood in a book titled Tukka, Real Australian Food.

Bruneteau then moved to Paris, France where he became the chef in two Australian themed restaurants, the Bennelong and Woolloomooloo. He later returned to Sydney.
