= List of Australian herbs and spices =

Australian herbs and spices were used by Aboriginal peoples to flavour food in ground ovens. The term "spice" is applied generally to the non-leafy range of strongly flavoured dried Australian bushfoods. They mainly consist of aromatic fruits and seed products, although Australian wild peppers also have spicy leaves. There are also a few aromatic leaves but unlike culinary herbs from other cultures which often come from small soft-stemmed forbs, the Australian herb species are generally trees from rainforests, open forests and woodlands.

Australian herbs and spices are generally dried and ground to produce a powdered or flaked spice, either used as a single ingredient or in blends.

They were used to a limited extent by colonists in the 18th and 19th centuries. Some extracts were used as flavouring during the 20th century. Australian native spices have become more widely recognized and used by non-Indigenous people since the early 1980s as part of the bushfood industry, with increasing gourmet use and export.

They can also be used as a fresh product. Leaves can be used whole, like a bay-leaf in cooking, or spicy fruits are added to various dishes for flavour.

The distilled essential oils from leaves and twigs are also used as flavouring products.

== Fruit ==
- Acronychia acidula, Lemon Aspen
- Acronychia oblongifolia, White Aspen, Yellow Wood
- Austromyrtus dulcis, Midgen Berry, Silky Myrtle
- Citrus australasica, Finger Lime, Caviar Lime
- Citrus australis, Round Lime, Australian Lime
- Citrus glauca, Desert Lime
- Eupomatia laurina, Bolwarra, Native Guava, Copper Laurel
- Kunzea pomifera, Muntries, Emu Apples, Native Cranberries
- Solanum centrale, Akudjura, Australian Desert Raisin
- Solanum chippendalei, Chippendale's Tomato, Bush Tomato
- Solanum cleistogamum, Potato Bush, Bush Tomato
- Syzygium luehmannii, Riberry, Cherry Alder, Small Leaf Lilly Pilly

== Herbs ==
- Apium insulare, Flinders Island Celery
- Apium prostratum, Sea Celery
- Atherosperma moschatum, safrole, southern sassafras
- Atriplex nummularia, Old Man Salt Bush
- Backhousia citriodora, citral chemovar, Lemon Myrtle
- Backhousia myrtifolia, elemicin chemovar, Cinnamon Myrtle
- Boronia safrolifera, safrole
- Crowea exalata, exalaticin
- Cinnamomum oliveri, safrole, Oliver's Cinnamon
- Cymbopogon refractus, Barbed wire grass
- Doryphora sassafras, safrole
- Doryphora aromatica, safrole
- Eucalyptus dives, piperitone chemovar, Peppermint Gum
- Eucalyptus globulus, cineole chemovar, Tasmanian blue gum
- Eucalyptus olida, methyl cinnamate chemovar, Strawberry Gum
- Eucalyptus polybractea, Blue-leaved Mallee
- Eucalyptus staigeriana, Lemon ironbark
- Melaleuca quinquenervia, Broad-leaf Paperbark
- Melaleuca leucadendron, Weeping Paperbark
- Mentha australis, River Mint
- Mentha diemenica, Slender Mint
- Mentha satureioides
- Ocimum tenuiflorum, Holy Basil
- Prostanthera incisa var. incisa, Cut-leaf Mintbush
- Prostanthera rotundifolia, Native Thyme
- Syzygium anisatum, trans-E-Anethole chemovar, Aniseed myrtle
- Zieria smithii, safrole

== Spices ==
- Acacia victoriae, Gundabluey, Wattleseed
- Alpinia caerulea, Native Ginger
- Tasmannia lanceolata, Mountain Pepper
- Tasmannia stipitata, Dorrigo Pepper
- Tasmannia insipida, Brush Pepper Bush
- Tasmannia xerophila, Alpine Pepperbush
