= MasterFoods =

Australian brand of condiments

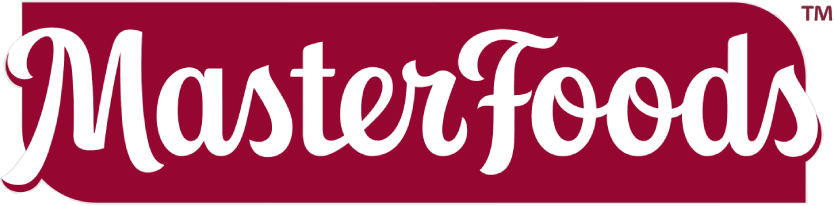
- Product type: Condiments
- Current owner: Mars Inc. (1967–present)
- Country: Australia
- Introduced: 1945; 81 years ago
- Markets: Worldwide
- Previous owners: Henry Lewis
- Website: masterfoods.com.au

MasterFoods is a brand of condiments manufactured by Mars Inc. Originally produced by Australian Henry Lewis & Company since 1945, the brand name "Masterfoods" was acquired by Mars in 1967.

== History ==
MasterFoods was created by Henry Lewis in Australia in 1945. Originally launched as "Henry Lewis & Company" in 1926, they began by importing specialty international foods and spices such as paprika, bay leaves and canned asparagus. The business was renamed to "Henry Lewis & Sons" and later Masterfoods (also seen as MASTERFOODS, MasterFoods and Master Foods) on 20 July 1945 and began manufacturing their own products in the 1950s.

Henry Lewis passed the business onto his sons John (born 1920), Victor (born 1923) and David (born 1929) all of whom worked in the business. John as chairman and managing director, Victor as production director and David as research director. Victor studied food technology in the United States of America, returning in 1949, becoming one of Australia's first food technologists. The company began manufacturing foods in the 1950s, with the first product being bread and butter cucumbers. During World War II when importation was restricted, the company acted as a distributor for Australian and New Zealand brands.

The brand was sold to Mars Inc. in 1967, and Mars Food Australia was created as a part of the purchase. At the time of sale, Masterfoods had over 150 products and were distributing to 40 countries, 25 percent of turnover was imported goods.

== See also ==
- List of brand name condiments
- List of spreads
- List of Australian herbs and spices
