= Bruneteau =

Bruneteau is a French-language surname.

People with the surname include:

- Ed Bruneteau (1919–2002), Canadian hockey player
- Gilles Joseph Martin Bruneteau (1760–1830), French Revolutionary and Napoleonic general
- Jean-Chrysostôme Bruneteau de Sainte-Suzanne (1773–1830), French Napoleonic general
- Jean-Paul Bruneteau (born 1956), French-Australian chef
- Mud Bruneteau (1914–1982), Canadian hockey player
