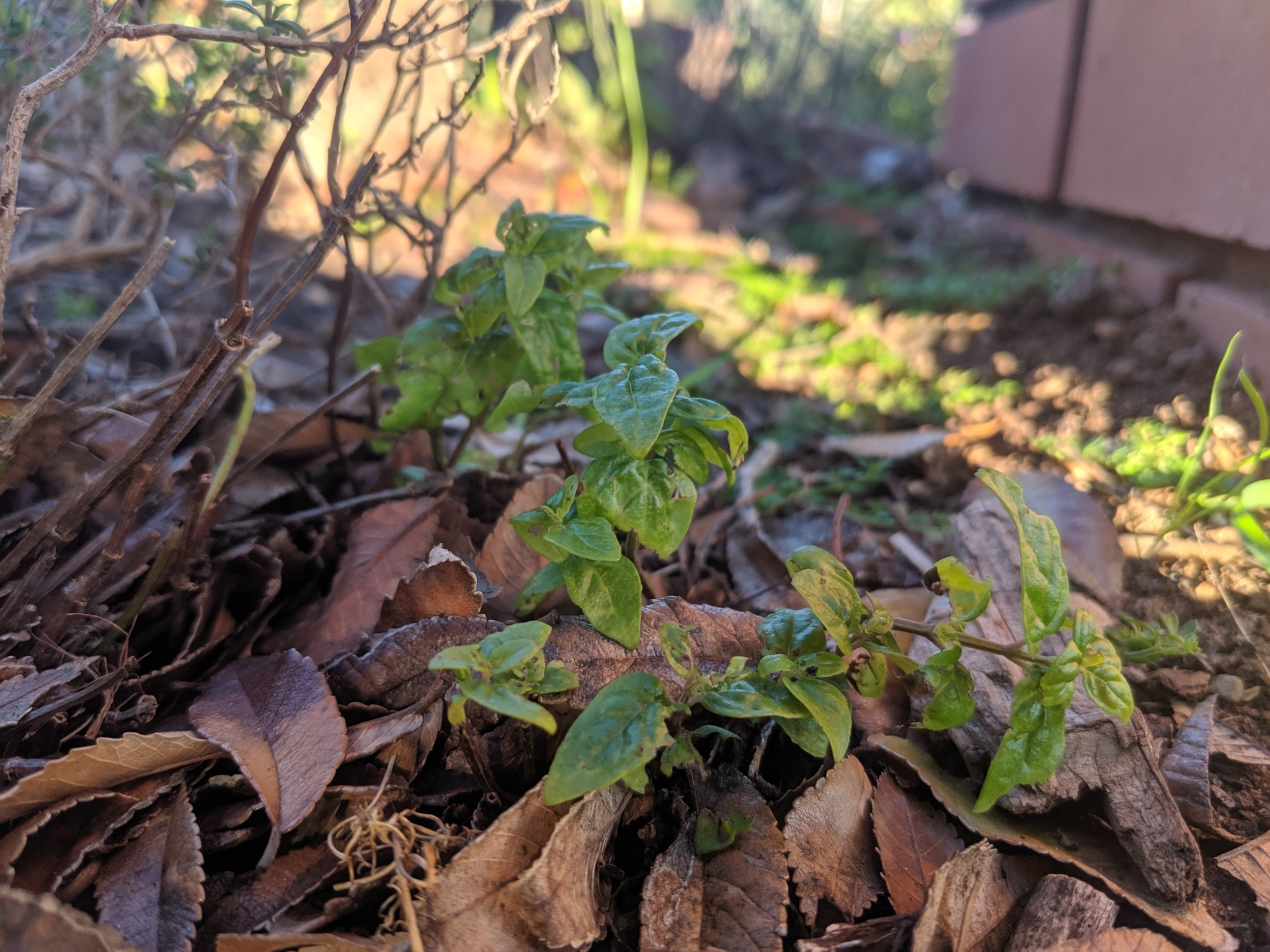

Scientific classification
- Kingdom: Plantae
- Clade: Tracheophytes
- Clade: Angiosperms
- Clade: Eudicots
- Clade: Asterids
- Order: Lamiales
- Family: Lamiaceae
- Genus: Mentha
- Species: M. australis

Binomial name
- Mentha australis R. Br.

= Mentha australis =

Australian mint

Species of flowering plant

Mentha australis is known by the common names of river mint, native mint, native peppermint, and Australian mint. It is a mint species within the genus Mentha.

It is a native of eastern Australia, occurring in every state and territory except Western Australia. It is also naturalized on the North Island of New Zealand.

== See also ==
- List of Australian herbs and spices
