= Wattleseed =

Acacia seeds eaten by Aboriginal Australians

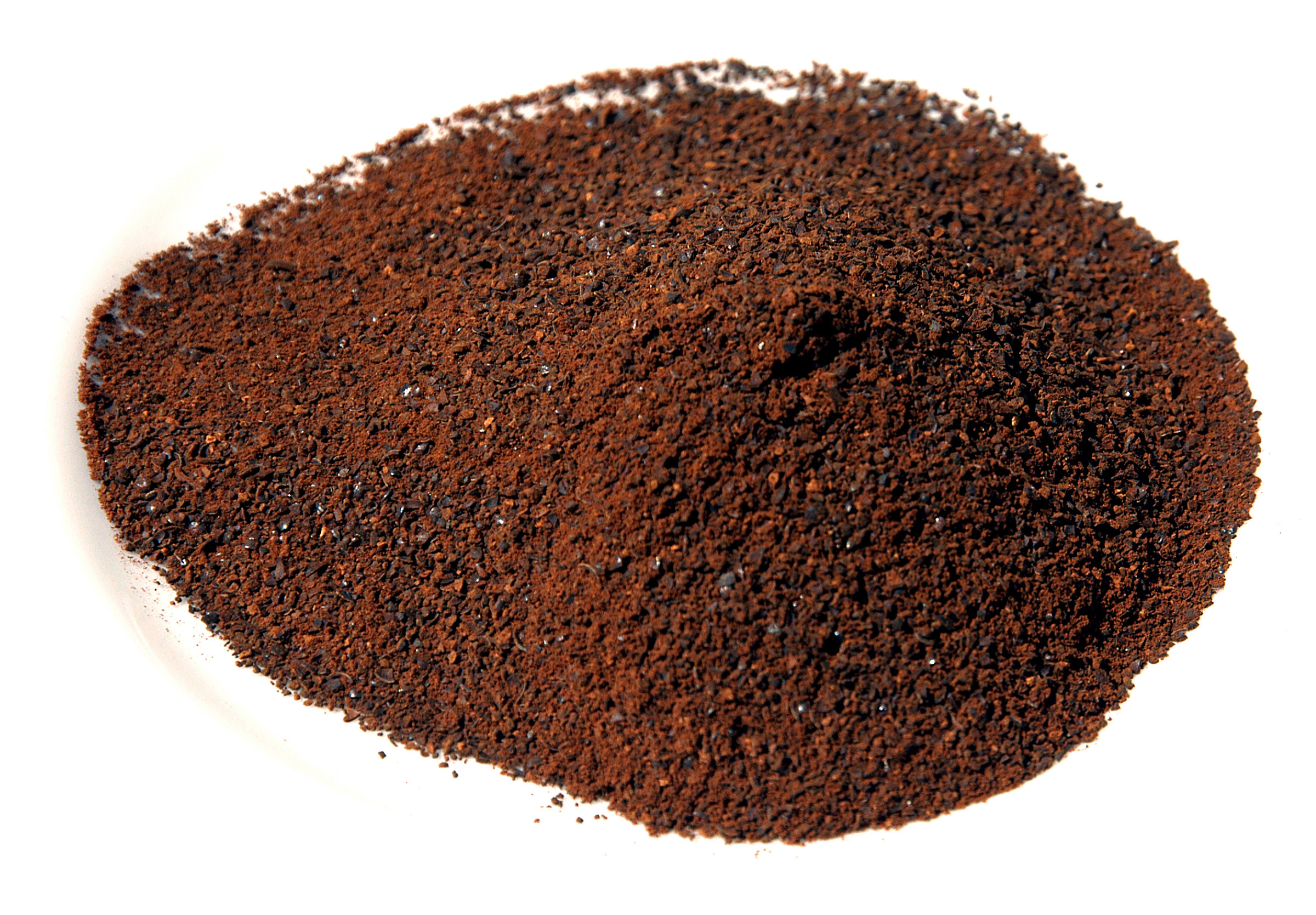
Roasted and ground seeds of the elegant wattle, Acacia victoriae

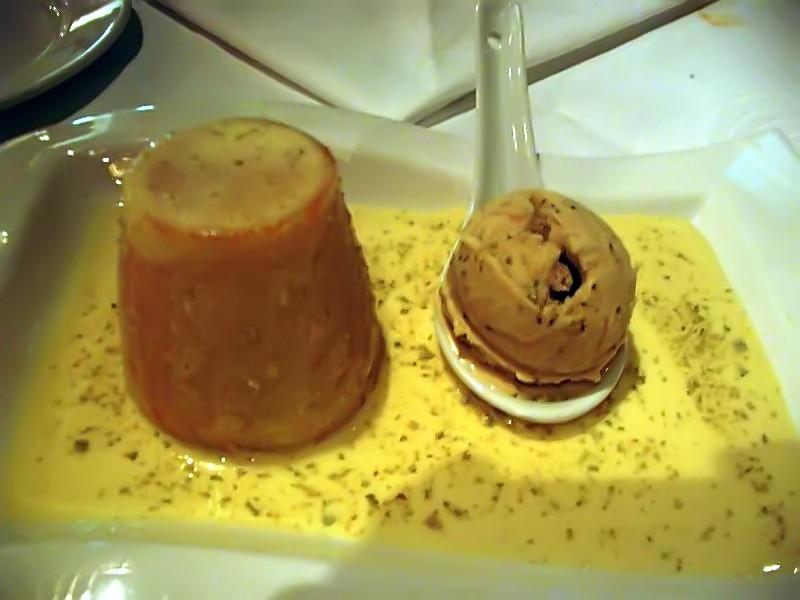
Steamed apple charlotte with wattleseed ice cream and crème anglaise

Wattleseeds are the edible seeds from any of 120 species of Australian Acacia that were traditionally used as food by Aboriginal Australians, and eaten either green (and cooked) or dried (and milled to a flour) to make a type of bush bread. Acacia murrayana and A. victoriae have been studied as candidates for commercial production.

Acacia seed flour has recently gained popularity in Australia due to its high nutritional content, hardiness, and low toxicity. Due to its low glycemic index, it is suitable for incorporation into diabetic foods. It is used due to its chocolate, coffee, hazelnut flavour profile. It is added to ice cream, granola, bread, chocolate, coffee, and used by chefs to enhance sauces and dairy desserts.

== History ==
Wattleseeds were a relatively recent addition to Aboriginal Australian diets with specialized seed grinders first dated to 1000 years ago. Many species require pre-treatment of seeds through parching at high temperatures, soaking, or cracking using seed grinders. Following the colonization of Australia, consumption of wattleseed decreased but was not eliminated. As early as 1814, Australian Acacia species were recognized for their tannin content and developed into plantation crops across the British Empire. Several species, including Acacia colei and A. mearnsii, have been maintained for their wattleseed in Niger and South Africa respectively.

== Cultivation ==
Wattleseed Acacia are perennial woody crops of varying age and size with some reaching 4m tall and 5m across. Their large size and multiple stems are an impediment to harvesting and have resulted in the development of several strategies of collecting seed pods, including 'finger stripping' of pods off of foliage, 'butt shaking' of the tree to dislodge pods, and whole biomass harvesting. The large number of species of Acacia has been seen as beneficial for the development of wattleseed as a commercial crop.

Trees can be arranged as either alley or phase arrangements for plantations, but Acacia have also seen use as windbreaks and groundcover for high salinity areas. Preparation can involve deep ripping of the soil to allow for water to soak as well as species specific pre-treatments. Water stress has the possibility to induce flowering and increase seed production with sufficient nutrient availability. The longevity of trees depends on spacing, climate, and species. In A. victoriae, trees do not begin flowering until 2–4 years old.

== See also ==
- Black wattle bark
