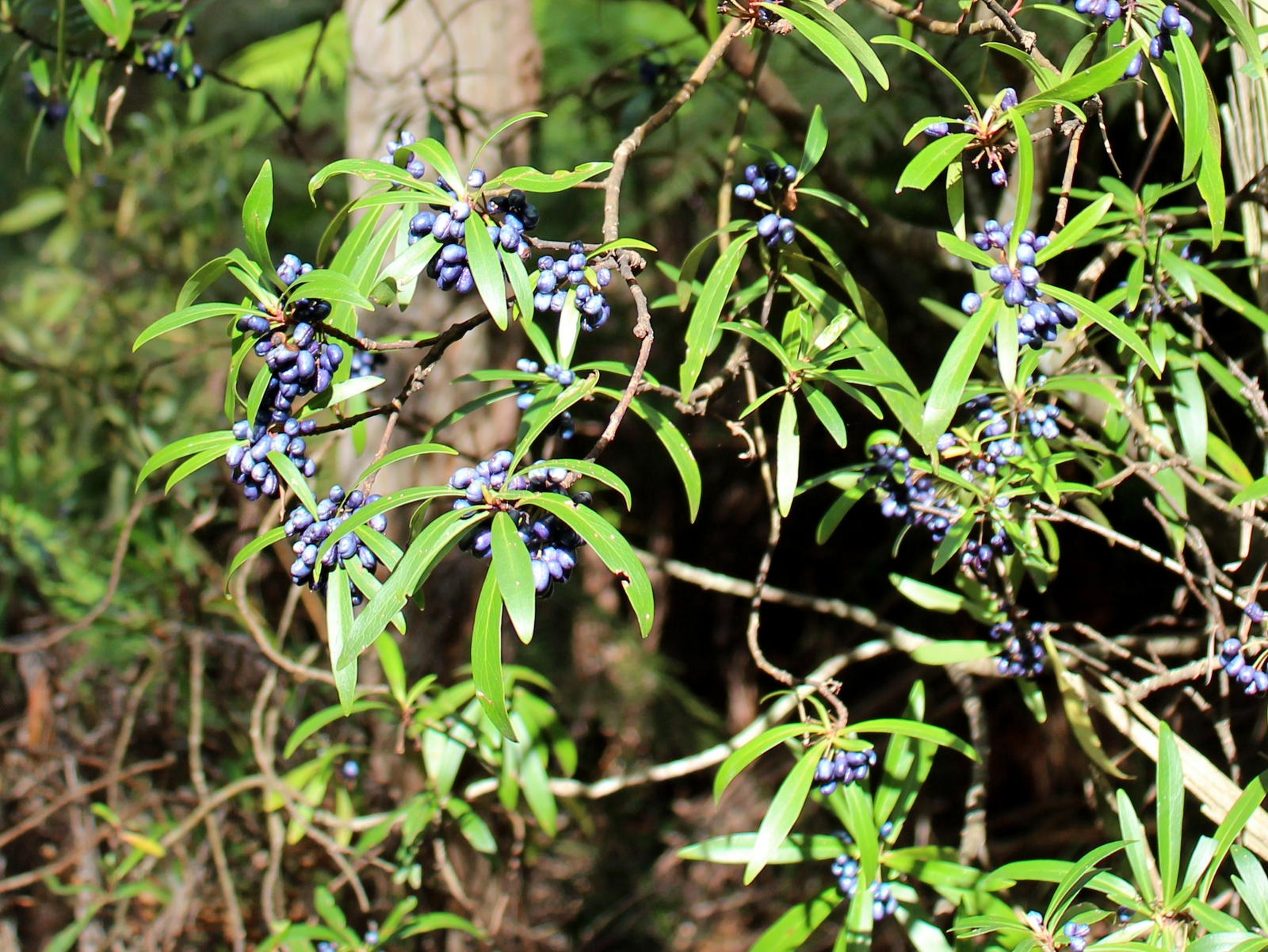
- In Werrikimbe National Park

Scientific classification
- Kingdom: Plantae
- Clade: Tracheophytes
- Clade: Angiosperms
- Clade: Magnoliids
- Order: Canellales
- Family: Winteraceae
- Genus: Tasmannia
- Species: T. stipitata

Binomial name
- Tasmannia stipitata (Vickery) A.C.Sm.

Synonyms
- Drimys aromatica var. pedunculata Maiden; Drimys stipitata Vickery

= Tasmannia stipitata =

Species of shrub

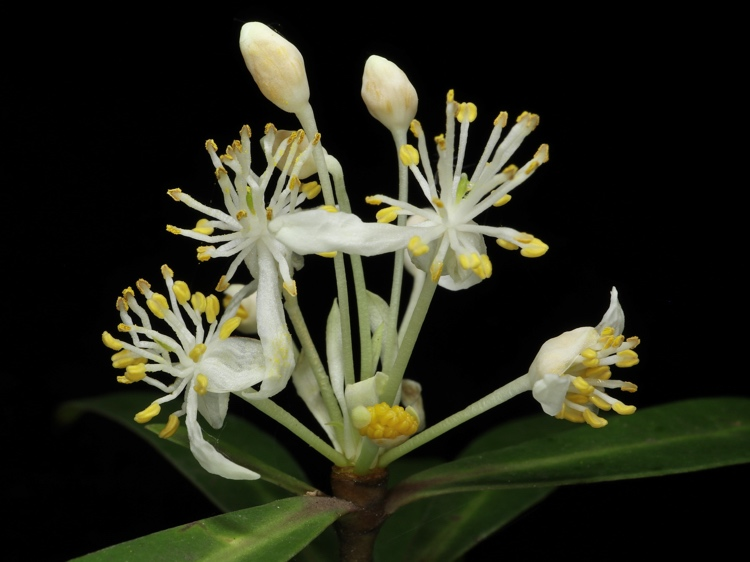
Male flowers in the ANBG

Tasmannia stipitata, commonly known as northern pepperbush is a flowering plant in the family Winteraceae and is endemic to eastern Australia. It has narrowly lance-shaped to narrowly elliptic leaves and male and female flowers on separate plants, the male flowers with 21 to 65 stamens and the female flowers with 2 to 9 carpels. The fruit is bluish-violet and contains 12 to 15 seeds.

== Description ==
Tasmannia stipitata is a shrub that typically grows to a height of 1–3 m (3 ft 3 in – 9 ft 10 in) and has smooth, dull purplish branchlets. Its leaves are lance-shaped to narrowly elliptic, 50–130 mm (2.0–5.1 in) long and 7–20 mm (0.28–0.79 in) wide, sometimes on a petiole up to 2 mm (0.079 in) long. Male and female flowers are borne on separate plants and usually have 2, sometimes up to 6 egg-shaped petals 5–15 mm (0.20–0.59 in) long. Male flowers are borne on a pedicel 12–20 mm (0.47–0.79 in) long and have 21 to 65 stamens, and female flowers are on a pedicel 17–30 mm (0.67–1.18 in) long with 2 to 9 carpels with 13 to 22 ovules. Flowering occurs from September to November and the fruit is an oblong to oval, bluish-violet berry 5–7 mm (0.20–0.28 in) long with 12 to 15 strongly curved seeds 2.3–2.6 mm (0.091–0.102 in) long.

== Taxonomy ==
'This species was first formally described in 1937 by Joyce Winifred Vickery who gave it the name Drimys stipitata in the Proceedings of the Linnean Society of New South Wales from a specimen collected by Joseph Maiden. In 1969, Albert Charles Smith transferred the species to Tasmannia as T. stipitata in the journal Taxon.

== Distribution and habitat ==
Tasmannia stipitata grows in moist forest and rainforest between Girraween National Park in south-eastern Queensland to Barrington Tops in northern New South Wales, usually at altitudes above 1,000 m (3,300 ft).

== Uses ==
=== Culinary use ===
The culinary quality of T. stipitata was recognized in the mid-1980s by horticulturist Peter Hardwick, who gave it the name 'Dorrigo pepper', and Jean-Paul Bruneteau, then chef at Rowntrees Restaurant, Sydney. It is mainly wild harvested from the Northern Tablelands of New South Wales. Dorrigo pepper has a woody-cinnamon and peppery note in the leaves and the fruit/seed. The hot peppery flavor is derived from polygodial, an essential oil component, common to most species in the family.

== See also ==
- List of Australian herbs and spices
