= Podocarpus elatus =

Conservation status
- Least Concern (IUCN 3.1)

Scientific classification
- Kingdom: Plantae
- Clade: Tracheophytes
- Clade: Gymnosperms
- Division: Pinophyta
- Class: Pinopsida
- Order: Araucariales
- Family: Podocarpaceae
- Genus: Podocarpus
- Species: P. elatus

Binomial name
- Podocarpus elatus R.Br. ex Endl.

Synonyms
- Margbensonia elata (R.Br. ex Endl.) A.V.Bobrov & Melikyan; Nageia elata (R.Br. ex Endl.) F.Muell.; Podocarpus acicularis Carrière, not validly publ.

Species of conifer

Podocarpus elatus, the plum pine, the brown pine, the Illawarra plum or the Queensland Christmas tree, is a species of conifer in the family Podocarpaceae, endemic to the east coast of Australia, in eastern New South Wales and eastern Queensland.

It is a medium to large tree growing to 30–36 m tall with a trunk up to 1.5 m diameter. The leaves are lanceolate, 5–15 cm long (to 25 cm long on vigorous young trees) and 6–18 mm broad. The seed cones are dark blue-purple, berry-like, with a fleshy base 2-2.5 cm diameter bearing a single oval or globose seed 1 cm in diameter.

== Uses ==
The fleshy part of the seed cone is edible, used in condiments. The timber was prized for furniture, joinery, boat planking, lining and piles in salt water. Podocarpus elatus is an attractive ornamental tree. In older Australian suburbs, the plum pine is used as an ornamental street tree, such as at Baldry Street, Chatswood.

The fruit has been used as a suitable alternative to sloe berries in the production of sloe-style gins in Australia.

== Gallery ==
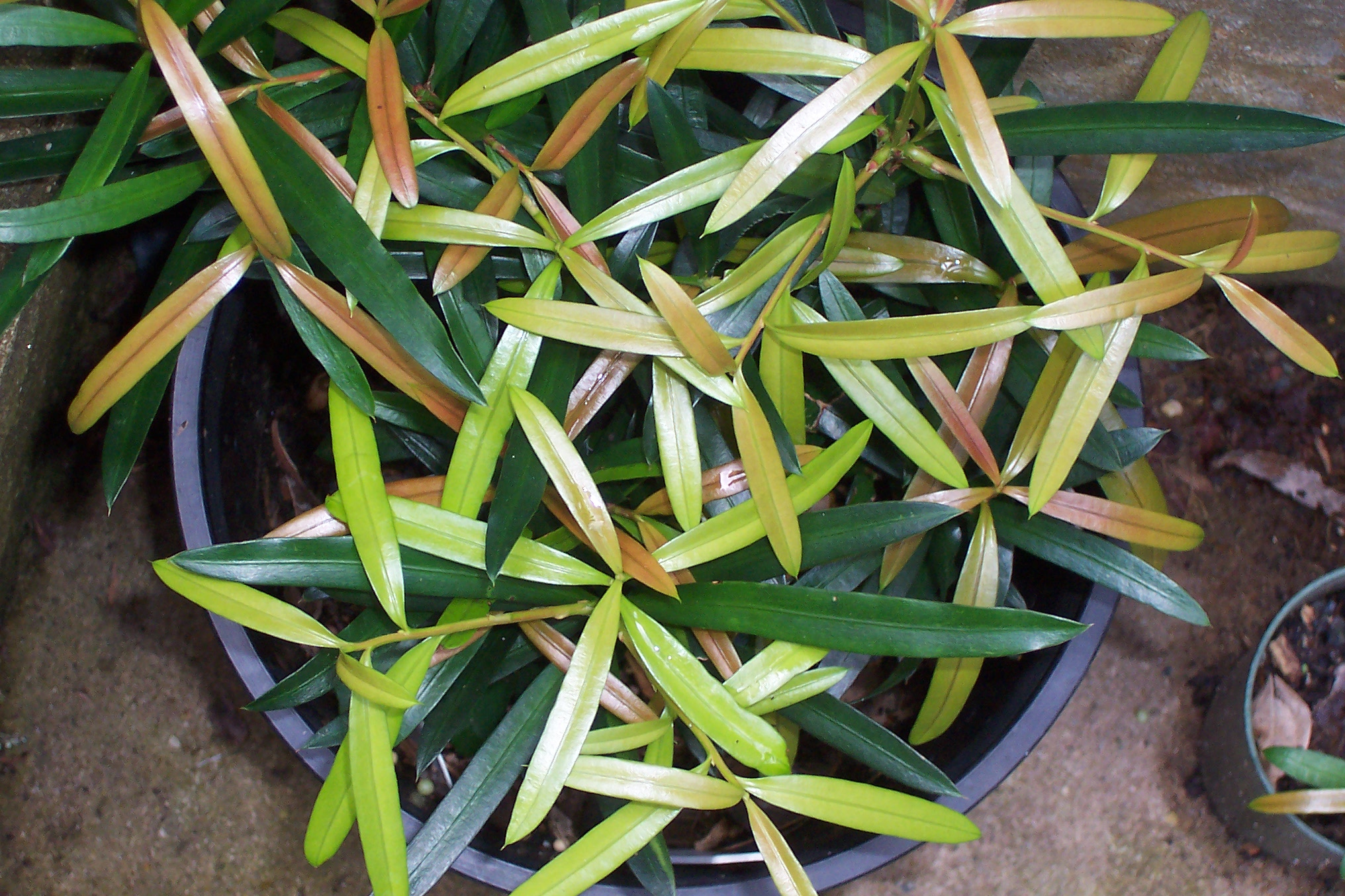
Juvenile foliage

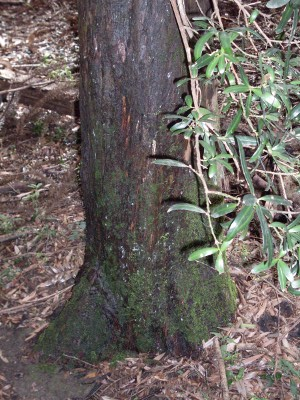
Podocarpus elatus trunk

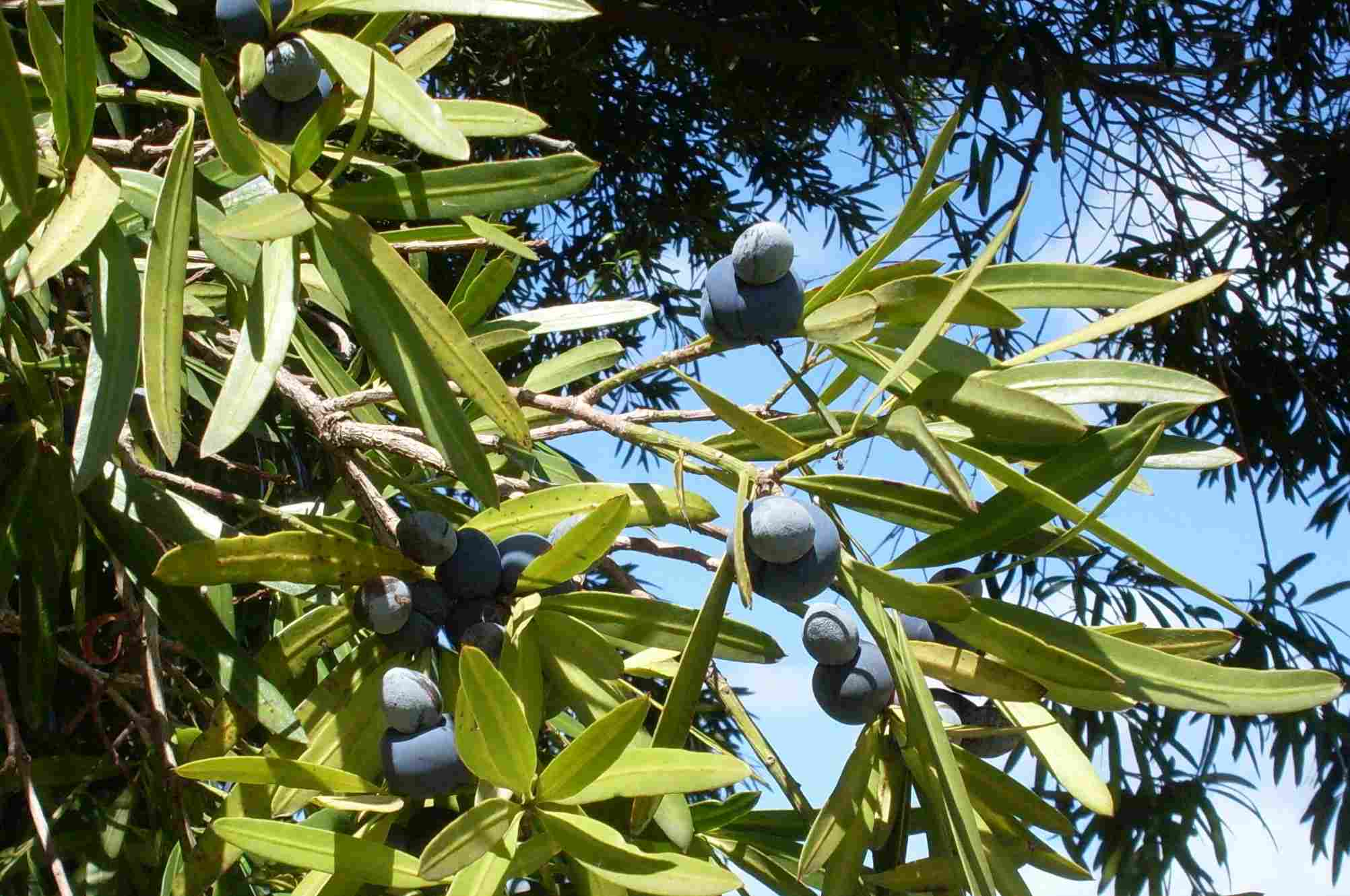
Podocarpus elatus foliage and naked seeds on fleshy receptacles

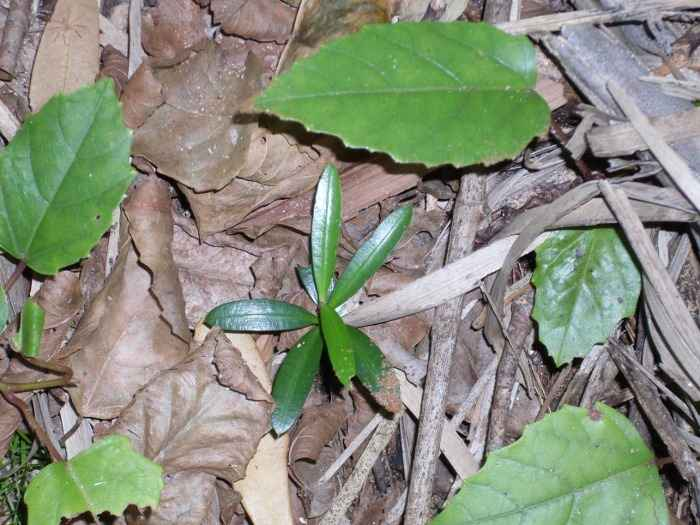
Podocarpus elatus growing in littoral rainforest on sand

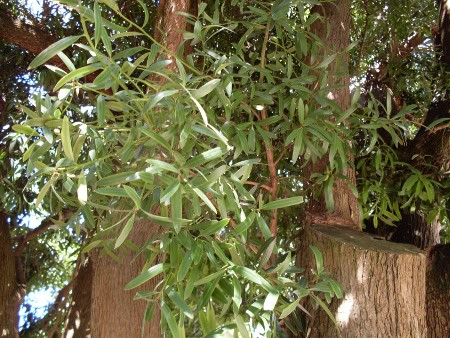
Podocarpus elatus bark and foliage

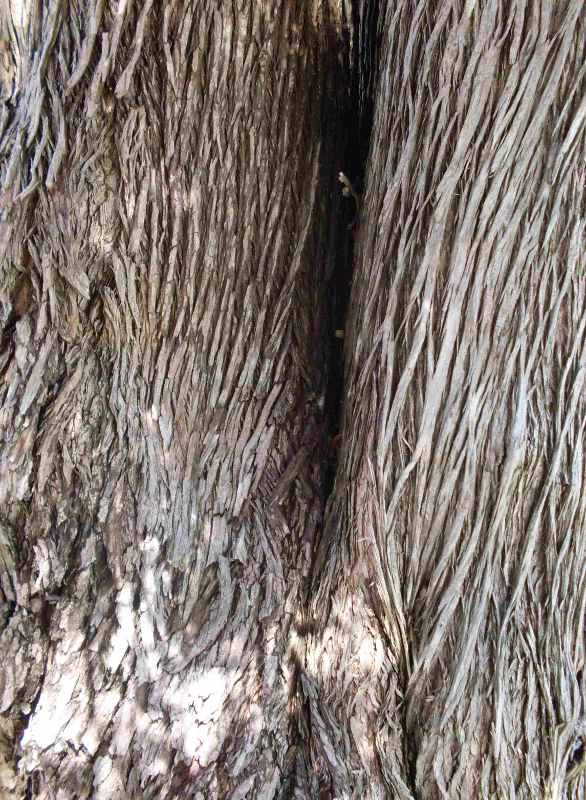
Podocarpus elatus bark

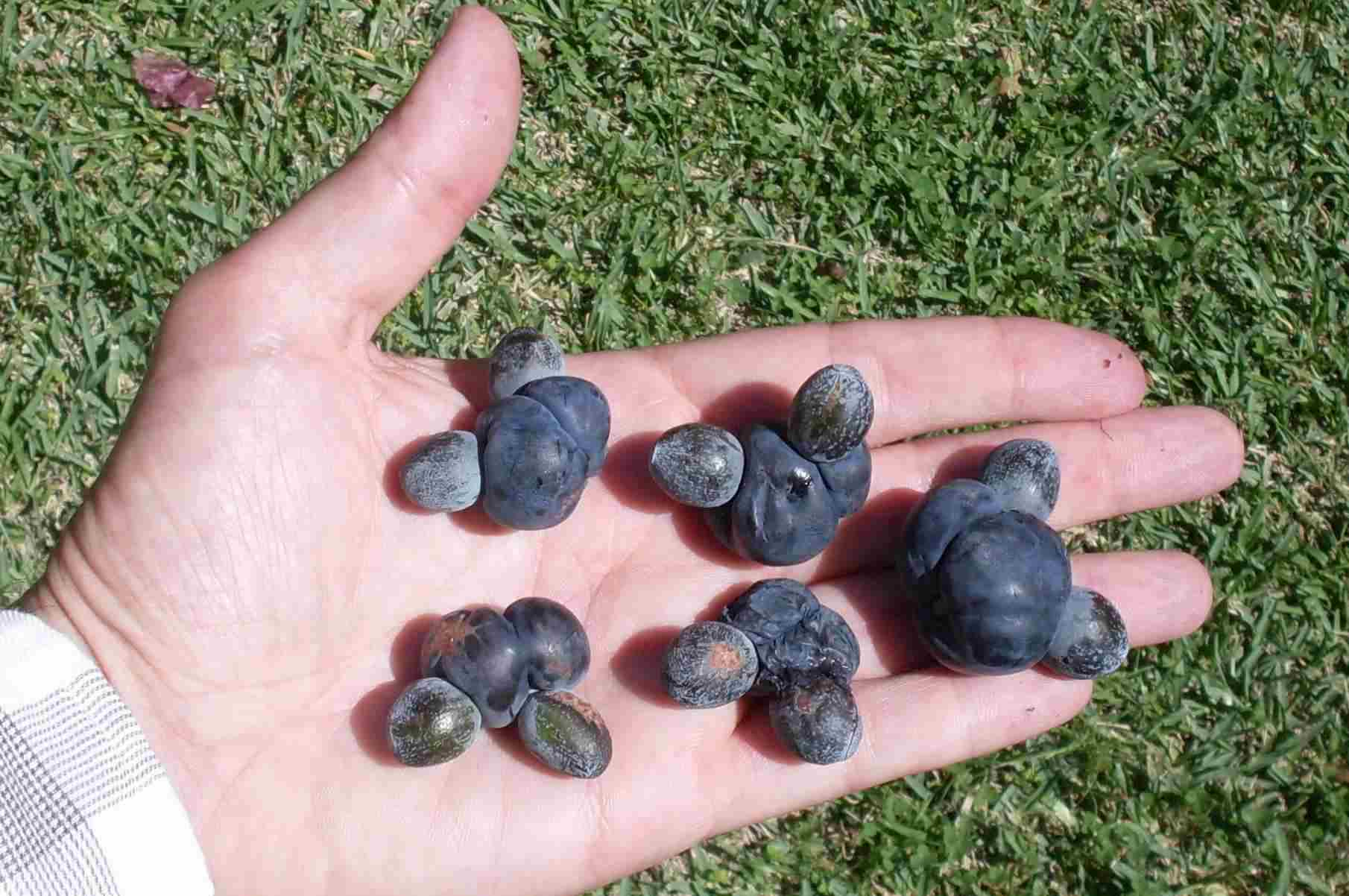
Podocarpus elatus unusually joined seed stems (receptacles)

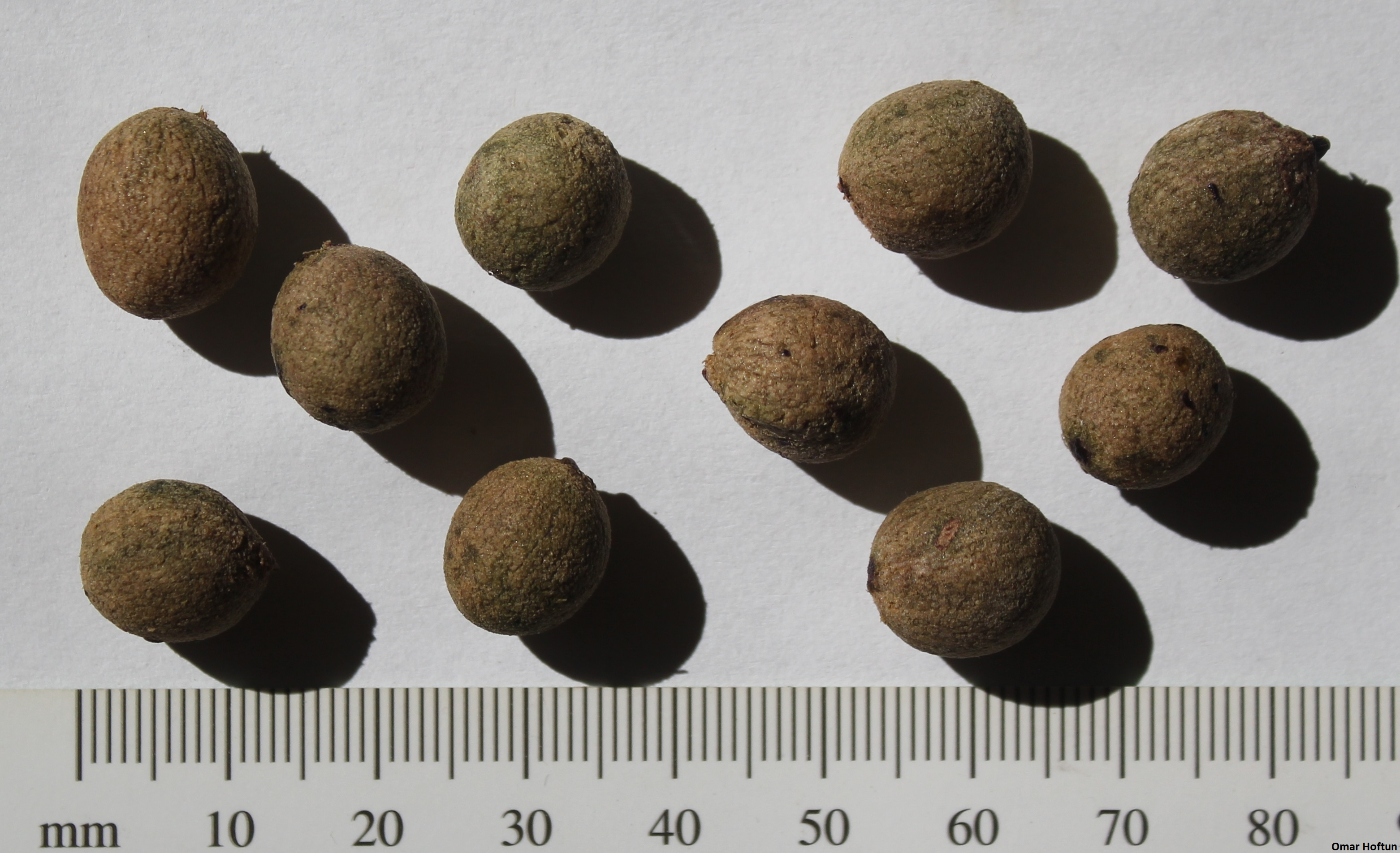
Podocarpus elatus seeds

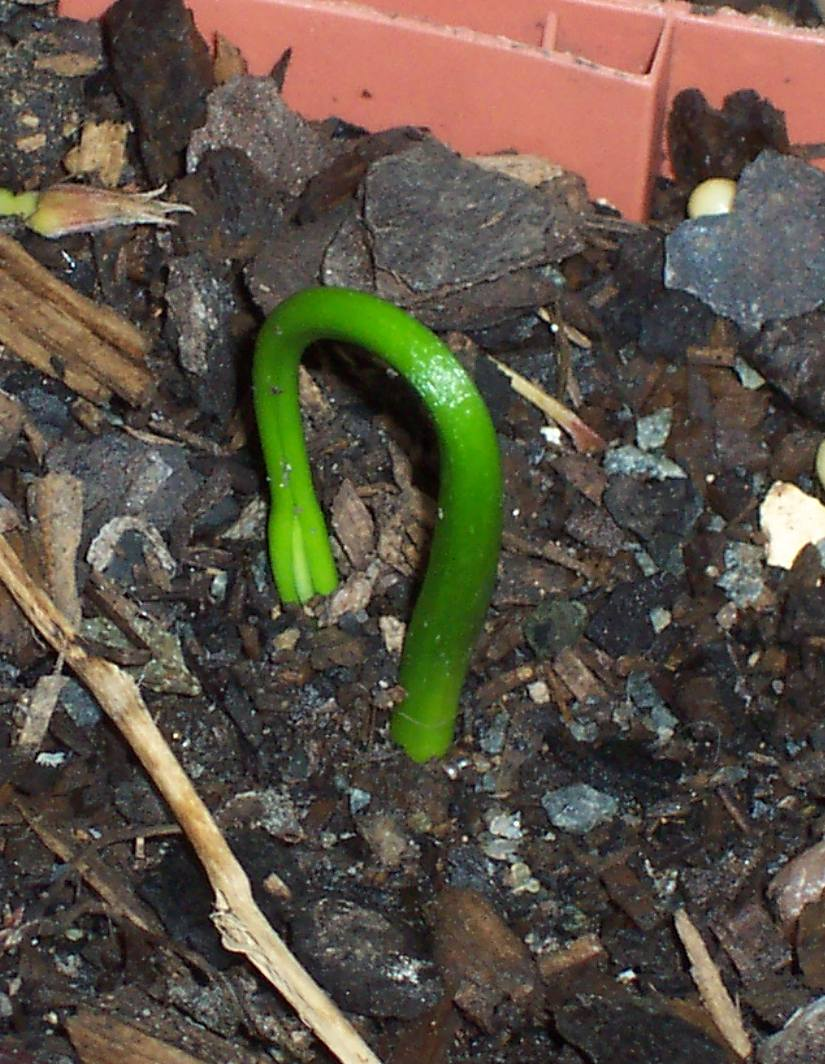
Podocarpus elatus germinating

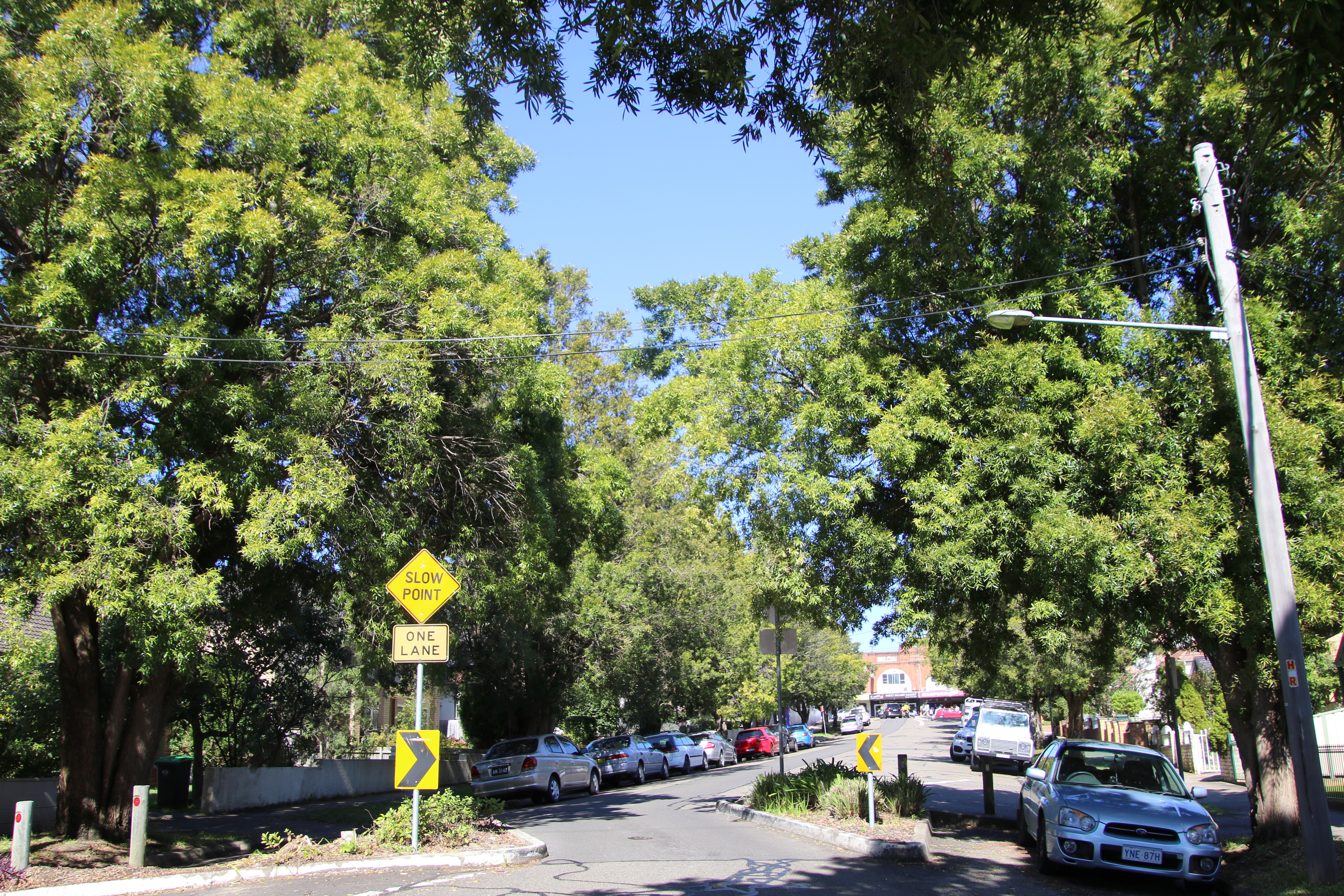
Baldry Street, Chatswood
