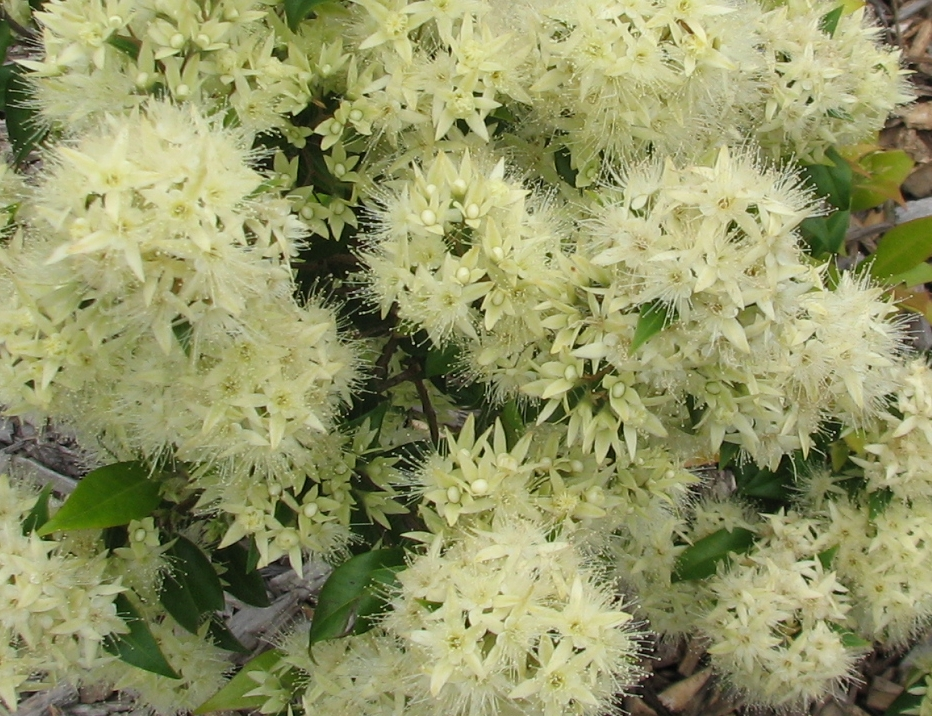
- Flowers
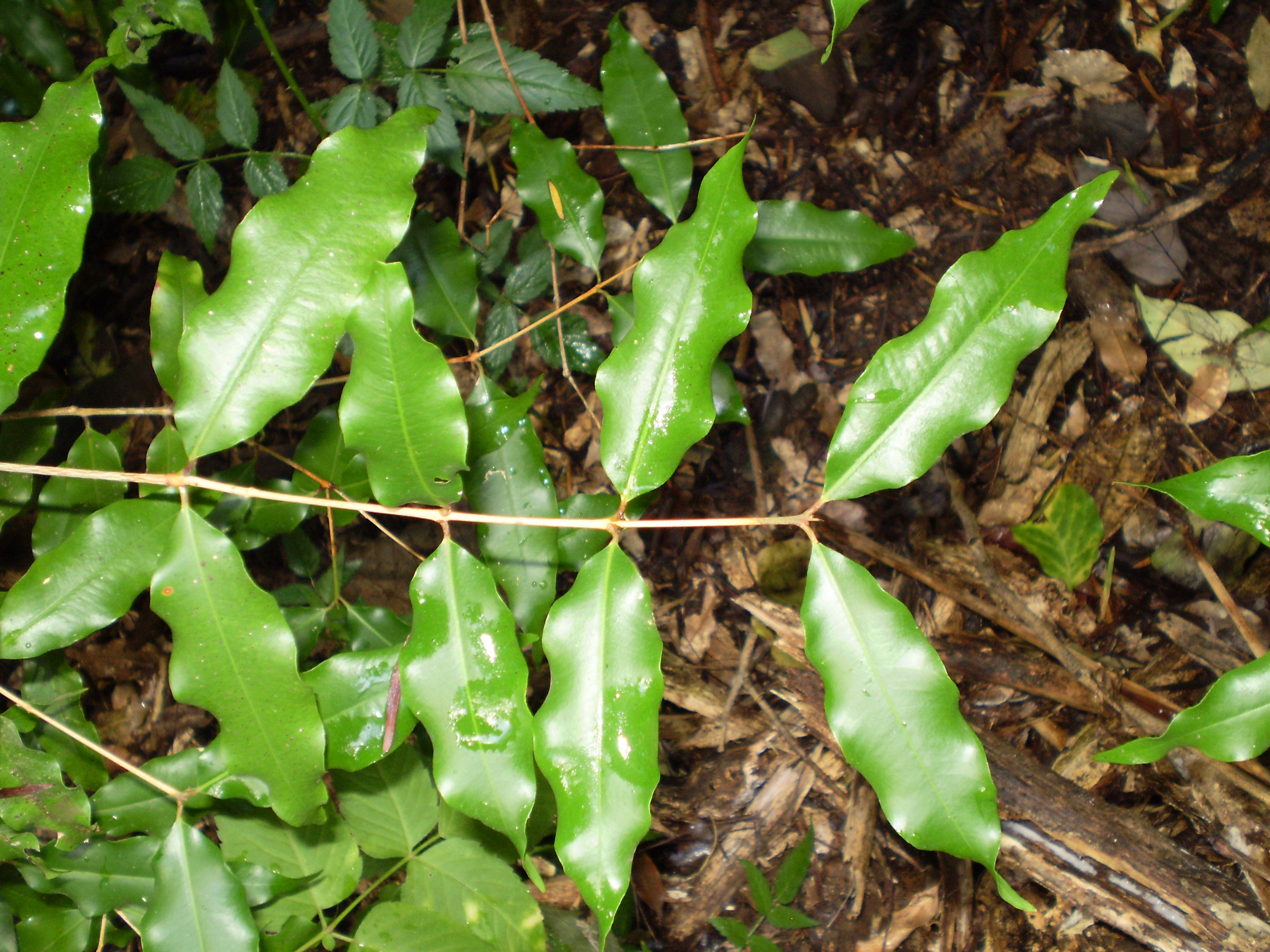

Scientific classification
- Kingdom: Plantae
- Clade: Embryophytes
- Clade: Tracheophytes
- Clade: Angiosperms
- Clade: Eudicots
- Clade: Rosids
- Order: Myrtales
- Family: Myrtaceae
- Genus: Syzygium
- Species: S. anisatum

Binomial name
- Syzygium anisatum (Vickery) Craven & Biffen

Synonyms
- Anetholea anisata (Vickery) Peter G.Wilson; Backhousia anisata Vickery

= Syzygium anisatum =

Species of tree

Syzygium anisatum, with common names ringwood and aniseed tree, is a rare rainforest tree native to New South Wales, Australia. The aromatic leaves contain an essential oil profile comparable to true aniseed.

The leaf from cultivated plantations is used as a bushfood spice and distilled for the essential oil, and is known in the trade as aniseed myrtle or anise myrtle.

The ringwood tree has a dense crown and grows up to 45 m (148 ft) tall. The leaves are 6–12 cm (2.4–4.7 in) long with prominently undulated margins and a rich aniseed aroma when crushed.

Flowers are white and sweetly scented, borne in panicles. The fruit are dry paper capsules around 5 mm (0.20 in) long and are white in appearance.

Ringwood's natural distribution in the wild is restricted to the Nambucca and Bellinger Valleys in northeastern New South Wales.

== Uses ==
Used as a flavouring spice and herbal tea ingredient. Although previously known, it was first sold in the early 1990s as a bushfood spice, and in the mid 1990s cultivated in plantations to meet demand.

The essential oil of S. anisatum contains anethole and methyl chavicol, imparting aniseed and licorice flavours.

'Aniseed myrtle' is the name originally coined to specifically describe high quality selections of the trans-anethole chemotype (90%+) - generally recognized as safe for flavouring. These selections are propagated from cuttings for consistent essential oil quality. The aniseed myrtle selections are also low in methyl chavicol and cis-anethole (less than 0.1%).

Research indicates that aniseed myrtle oil has antimicrobial activity, including on the pathogenic yeast Candida albicans.

== Myrtle rust ==
A significant fungal pathogen, myrtle rust (Austropuccinia), was detected in aniseed myrtle plantations in January 2011. Myrtle rust severely damages new growth and threatens aniseed myrtle production. Controls are being developed.

== See also ==
- List of Australian herbs and spices
