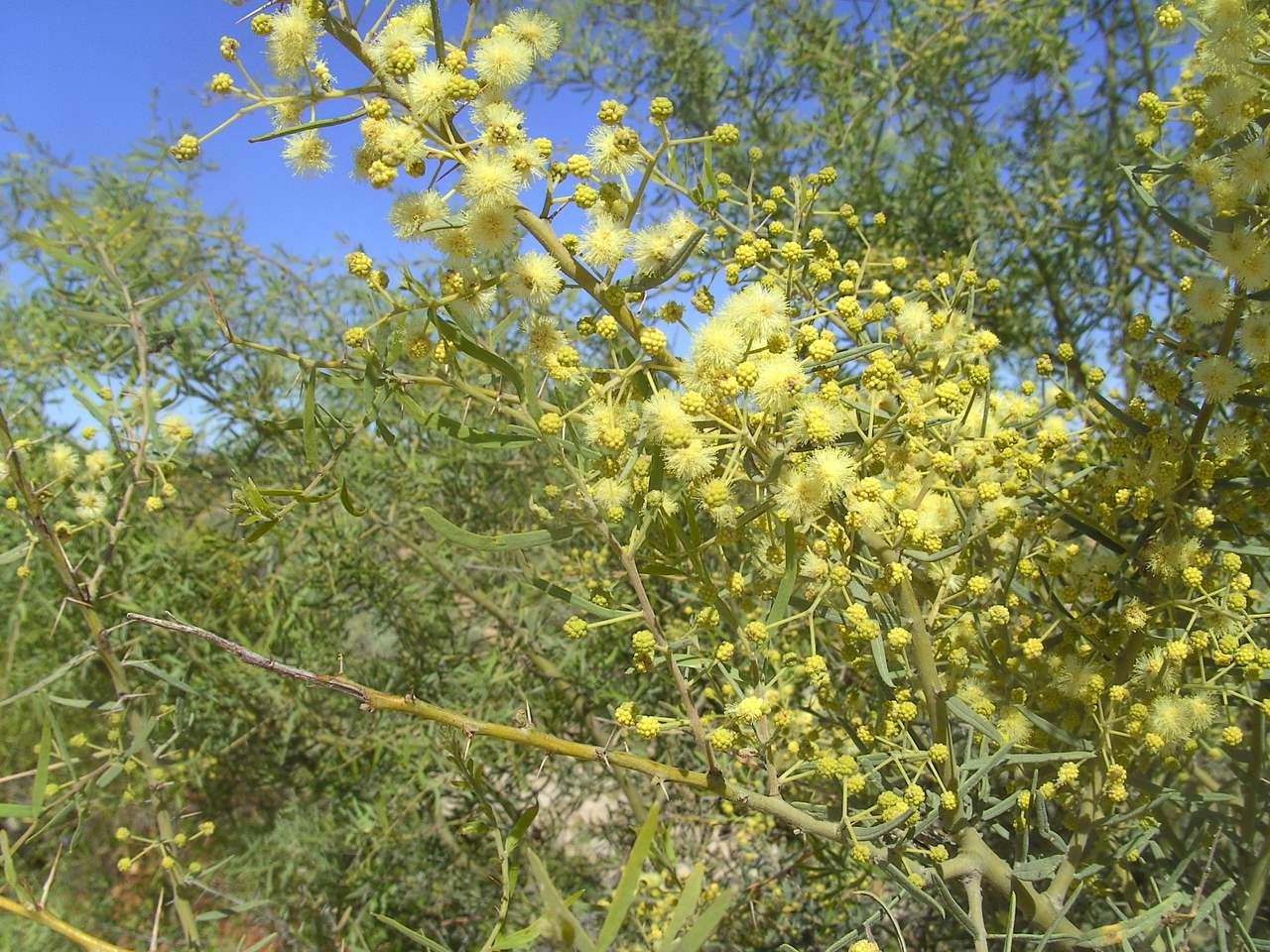

Scientific classification
- Kingdom: Plantae
- Clade: Embryophytes
- Clade: Tracheophytes
- Clade: Angiosperms
- Clade: Eudicots
- Clade: Rosids
- Order: Fabales
- Family: Fabaceae
- Subfamily: Caesalpinioideae
- Clade: Mimosoid clade
- Genus: Acacia
- Species: A. victoriae

Binomial name
- Acacia victoriae Benth.
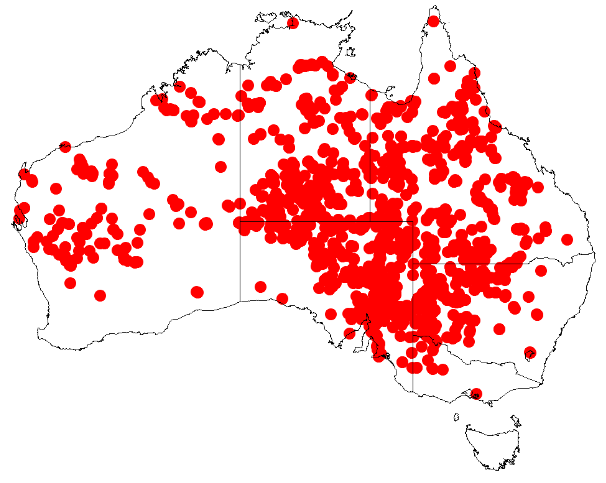
- Occurrence data from AVH

Synonyms
- Acacia coronalis J.M. Black; Acacia decora auct. non Rchb.; Acacia decora Rchb. var. spinescens Benth.; Acacia hannianav Domin; Acacia sentis Benth.; Acacia sentis F.Muell.; Acacia sentis Benth. var. victoriae (Benth.)Domin; Racosperma victoriae (Benth.) Pedley"

= Acacia victoriae =

Species of plant

Acacia victoriae, commonly known as elegant wattle, bramble wattle, prickly wattle, gundabluey, gundabluie or bardi bush, is a shrub-like tree native to Australia. There is a single subspecies: A. victoriae subsp. arida Pedley.

== Description ==
Acacia victoriae matures into a shrub-like tree with multiple trunks. It reaches a height of about 5–6 metres (16 1/2–19 1/2 ft) and is moderately fast growing. It has a life-span of about 10–15 years. The tree has a large root system, known to extend to 20 m (66 ft). It is able to survive drought fairly well, but not in severe drought, though it can regenerate from suckers. Flowering begins in August and continues into late December, depending on the region in which the tree is found.

The branches of Acacia victoriae are covered in small spines that are about 1 cm in length. During flowering, the branches are fully clustered with yellowish and strongly scented flowers. Each flower is in a pair within the 12 cm cluster. Seeds are found in 8 cm pale-coloured pods. The seeds themselves are about 0.5 cm and brown in colour. The timing of seed maturation varies.

== Distribution and ecology ==
Acacia victoriae is found in arid and semiarid areas, generally in alkaline soils including clayey alluvials, grey cracking clays and saline loams on floodplains, alluvial flats, rocky hillsides and ridges. Animals such as birds and small mammals are known to use the tree as protection. The seeds and foliage also offer a source of food to animals.

== Uses ==
=== Food ===
The nitrogen-containing seeds are used in breads as well as ground up as meal. Aboriginal Australians are helping to apply their methods in using the seeds from A. victoriae for food. The seeds have also been used as fodder, being a good source of protein.

=== Land uses ===
Acacia victoriae is useful when used as a windbreak and also helps with soil stabilization. Because it is able to grow at a moderate rate, it has also been used for site rehabilitation.

== Gallery ==
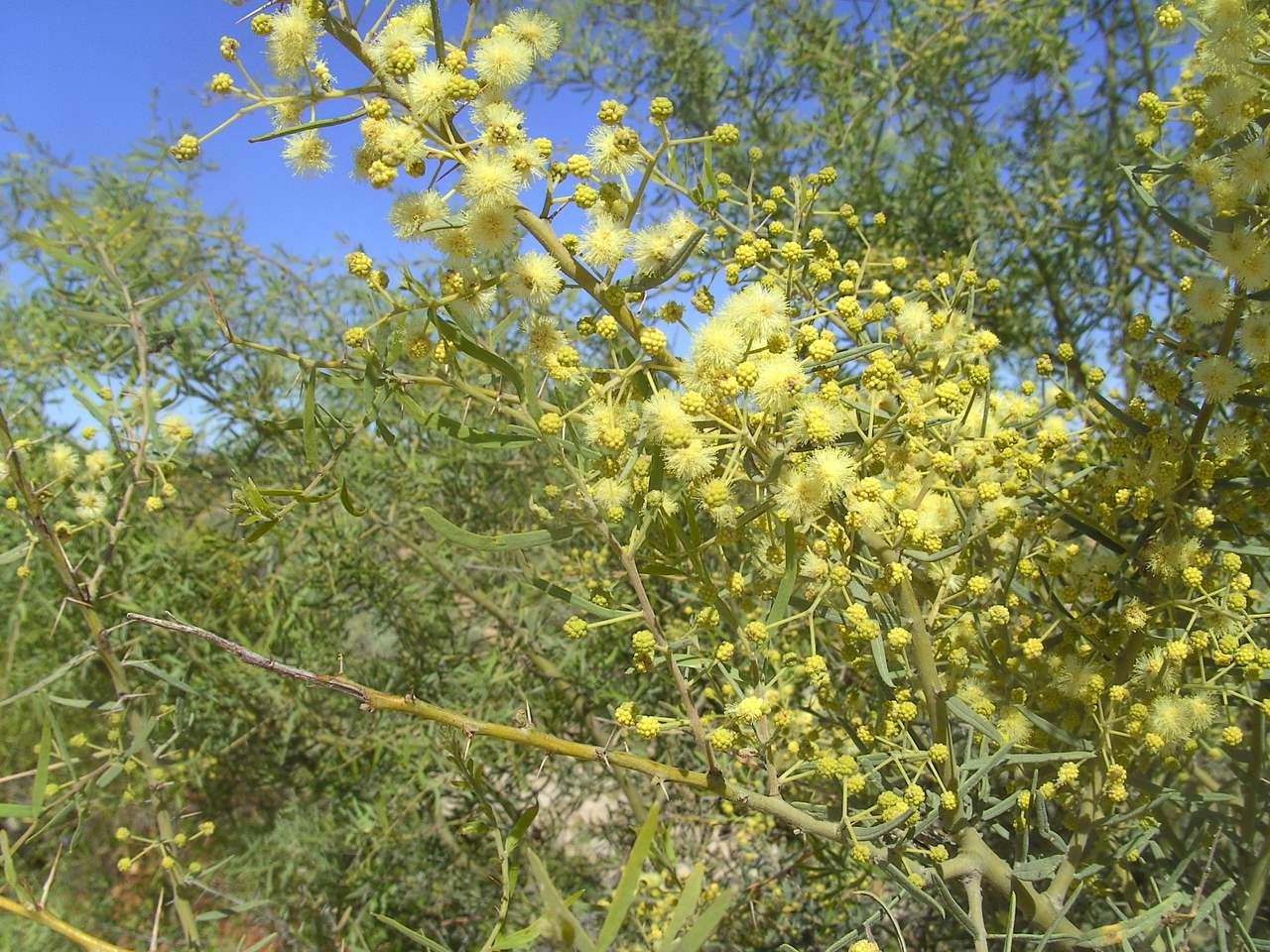
Flowers

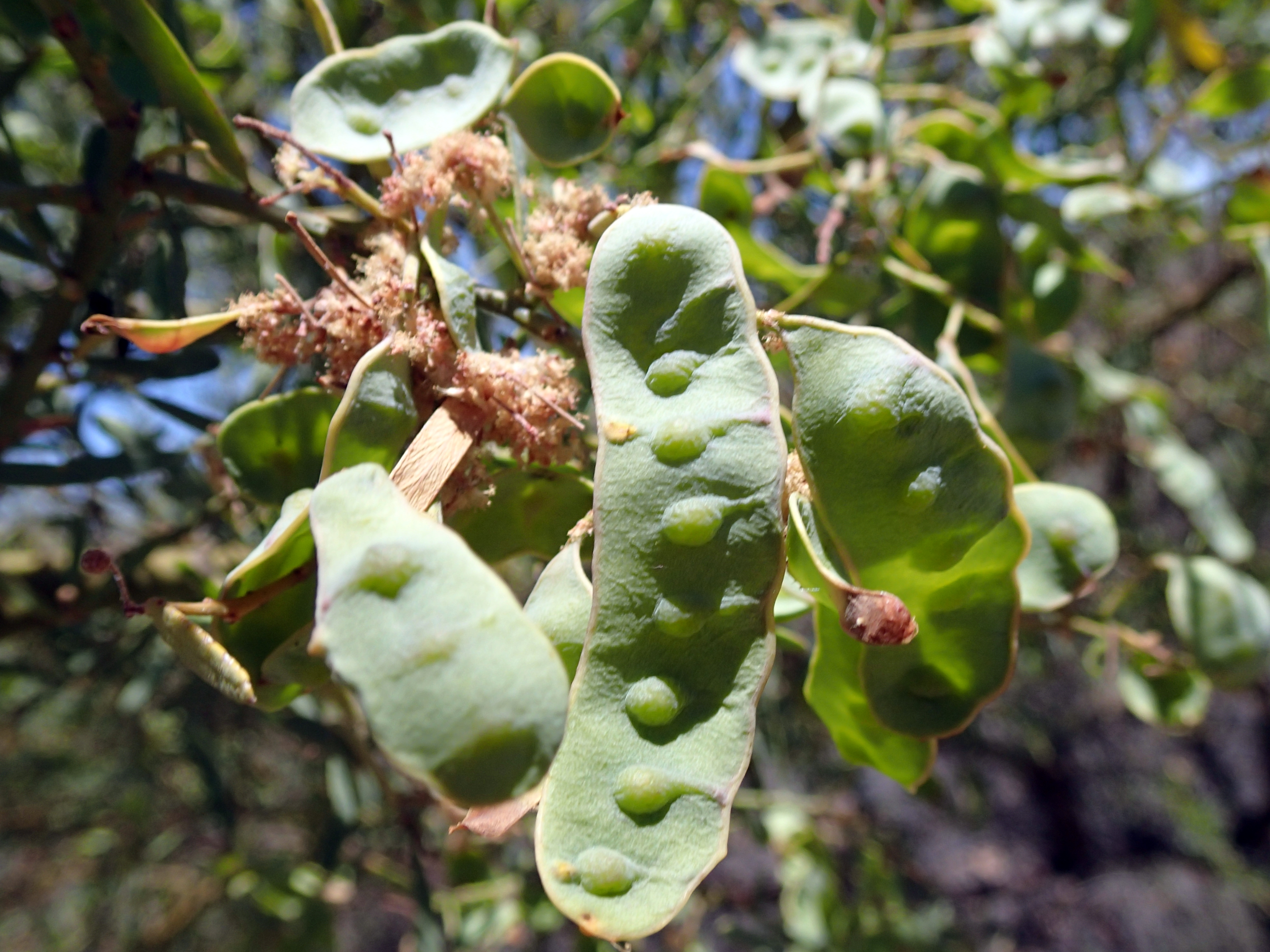
Seed pods

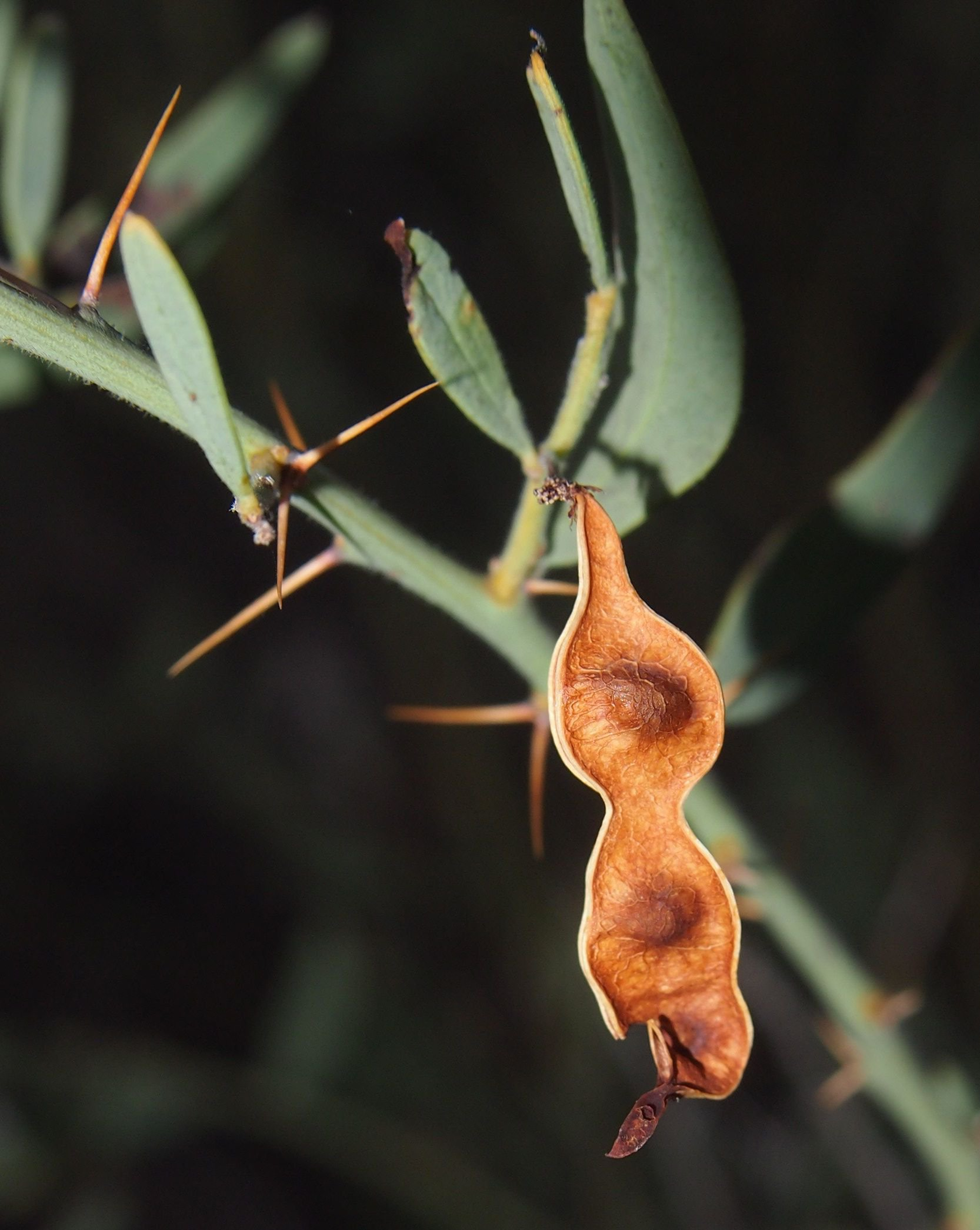
Legume

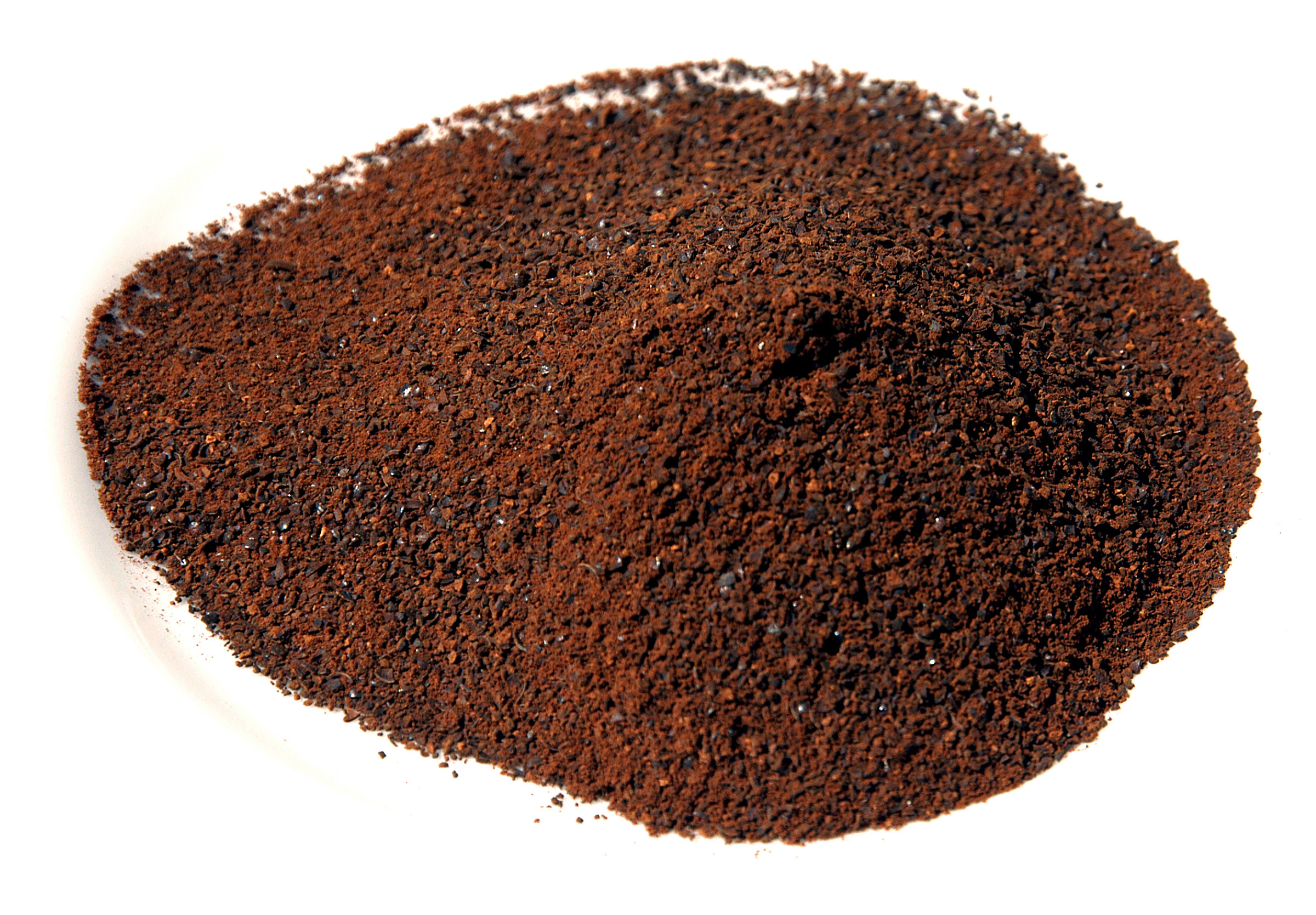
Roasted and ground seeds

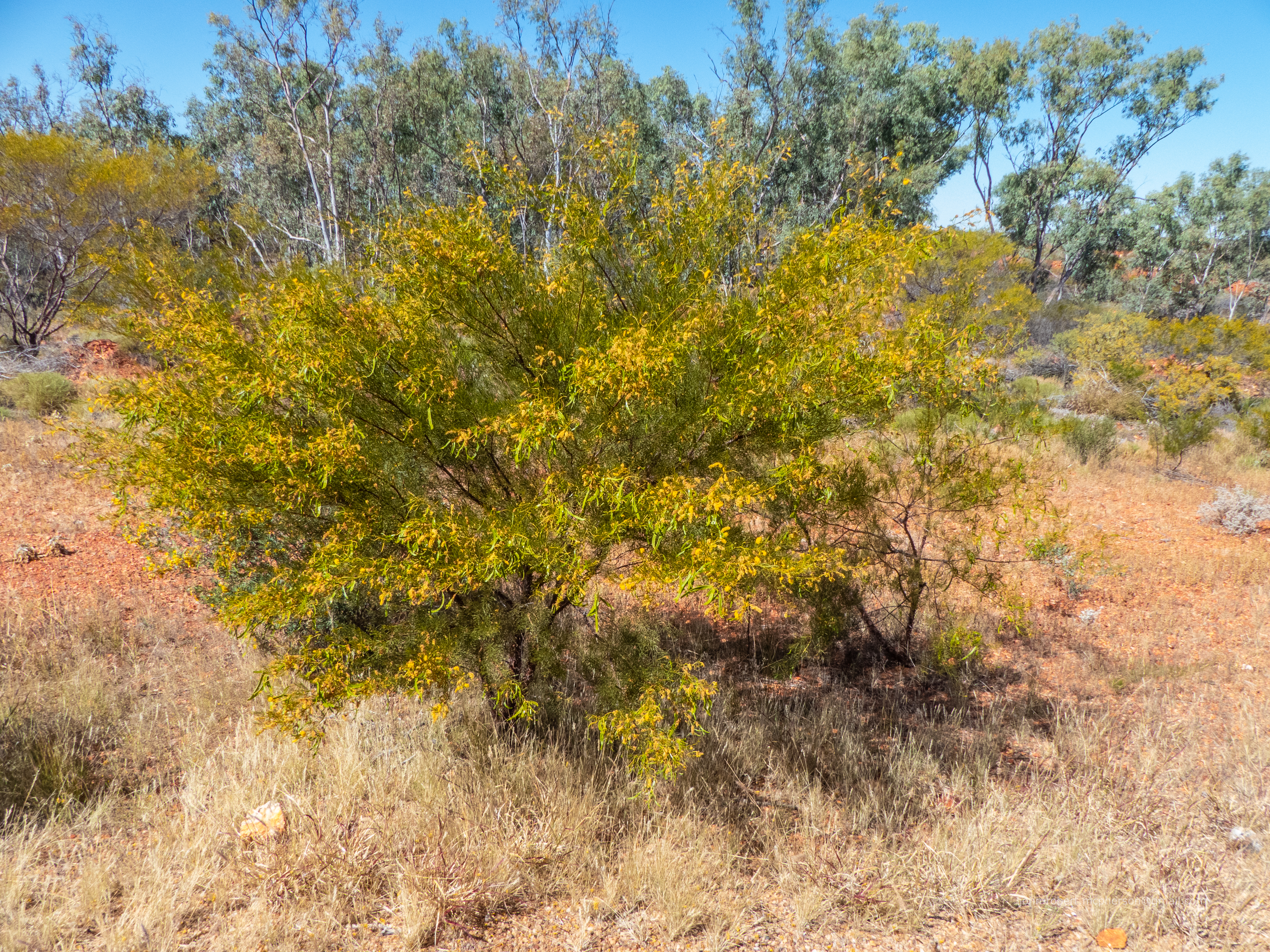
Habit in Boulia Shire, Queensland.

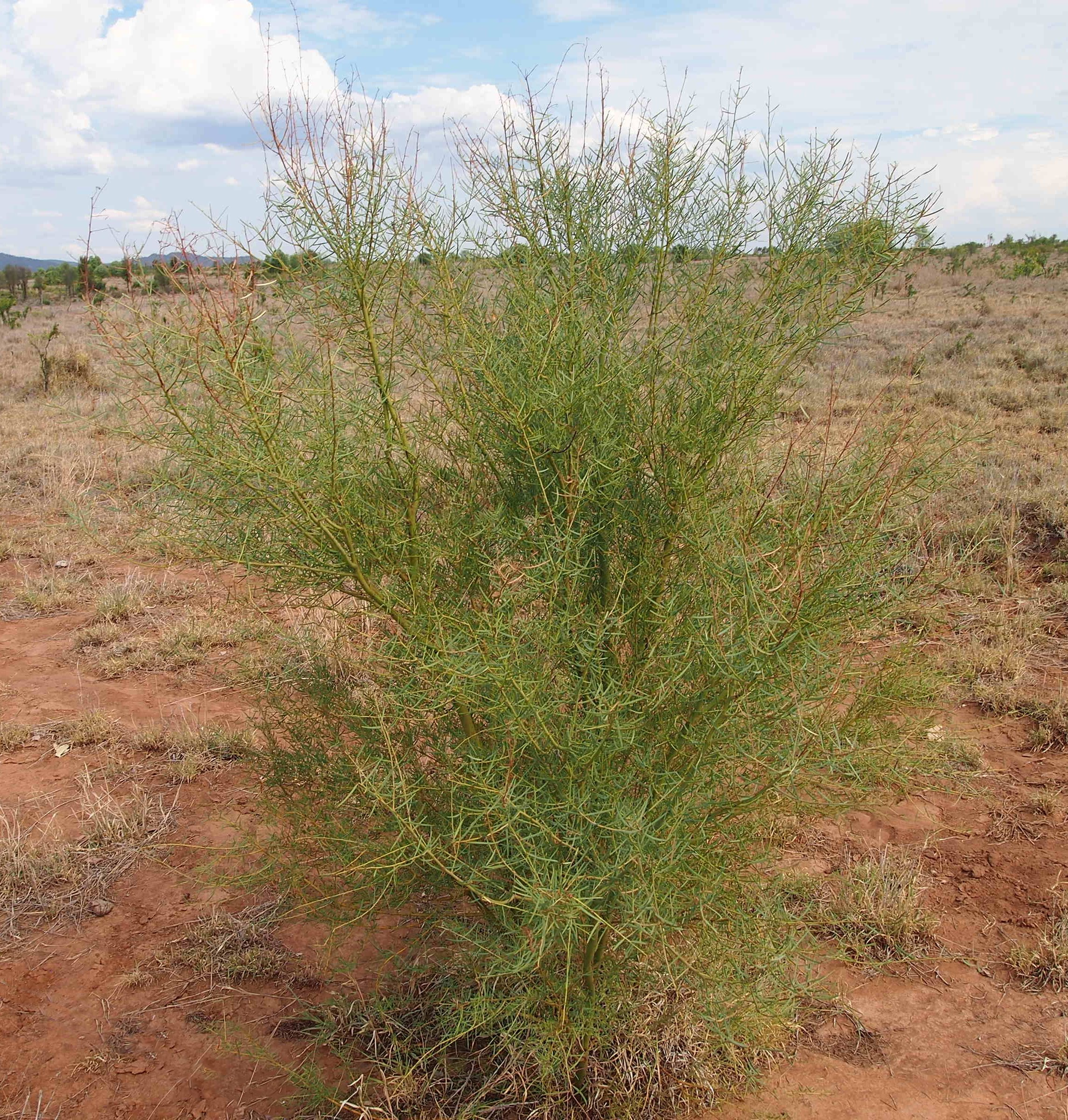
Habit

== See also ==
- List of Australian herbs and spices
- List of Acacia species
