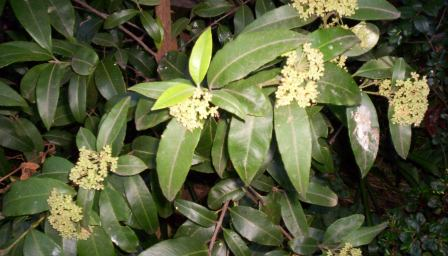
- Garden specimen, in flower

Scientific classification
- Kingdom: Plantae
- Clade: Embryophytes
- Clade: Tracheophytes
- Clade: Spermatophytes
- Clade: Angiosperms
- Clade: Eudicots
- Clade: Rosids
- Order: Myrtales
- Family: Myrtaceae
- Genus: Backhousia
- Species: B. citriodora

Binomial name
- Backhousia citriodora F.Muell.

= Backhousia citriodora =

Lemon myrtle

Species of tree

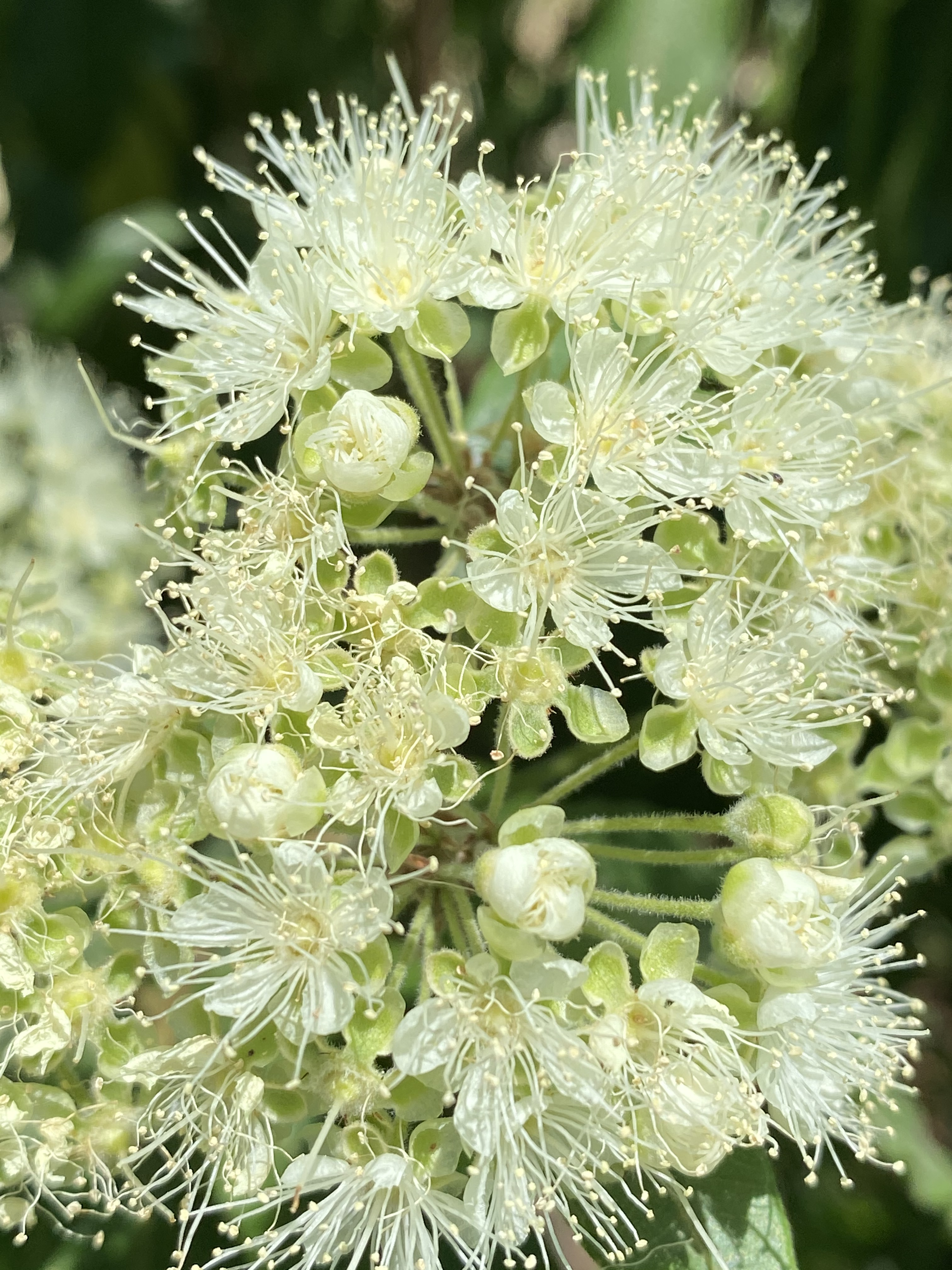
Flowers

Backhousia citriodora, commonly known as lemon myrtle, lemon scented myrtle or lemon scented ironwood, is a flowering plant in the family Myrtaceae. It is native to the subtropical rainforests of central and south-eastern Queensland, Australia, with a natural distribution from Mackay to Brisbane.

== Description and ecology ==
The species can reach 6 m (20 ft) in height, but is often smaller. The leaves are evergreen, opposite, lanceolate, 5–12 cm (2.0–4.7 in) long and 1.5–2.5 cm (0.6–1.0 in) broad, glossy green, with an entire margin. The flowers are creamy-white, 5–7 mm (0.20–0.28 in) in diameter, produced in clusters at the ends of the branches from summer through to autumn. After petal fall, the calyx is persistent.

A significant fungal pathogen, myrtle rust (Uredo rangelii) was detected in lemon myrtle plantations in January 2011. Myrtle rust severely damages new growth and threatens lemon myrtle production.

== Etymology ==
Lemon myrtle was given the botanical name Backhousia citriodora by Ferdinand von Mueller in 1853 after his friend, the English botanist, James Backhouse.

The common name reflects the strong lemon smell of the crushed leaves. 'Lemon scented myrtle' was the primary common name until the shortened trade name, 'lemon myrtle', was created by the native foods industry to market the leaf for culinary use. Lemon myrtle is now the more common name for the plant and its products.

Lemon myrtle is sometimes confused with 'lemon ironbark', which is Eucalyptus staigeriana. Other common names are sweet verbena tree, lemon scented verbena (not to be confused with lemon verbena), and sweet verbena myrtle.

== Uses ==
=== History ===
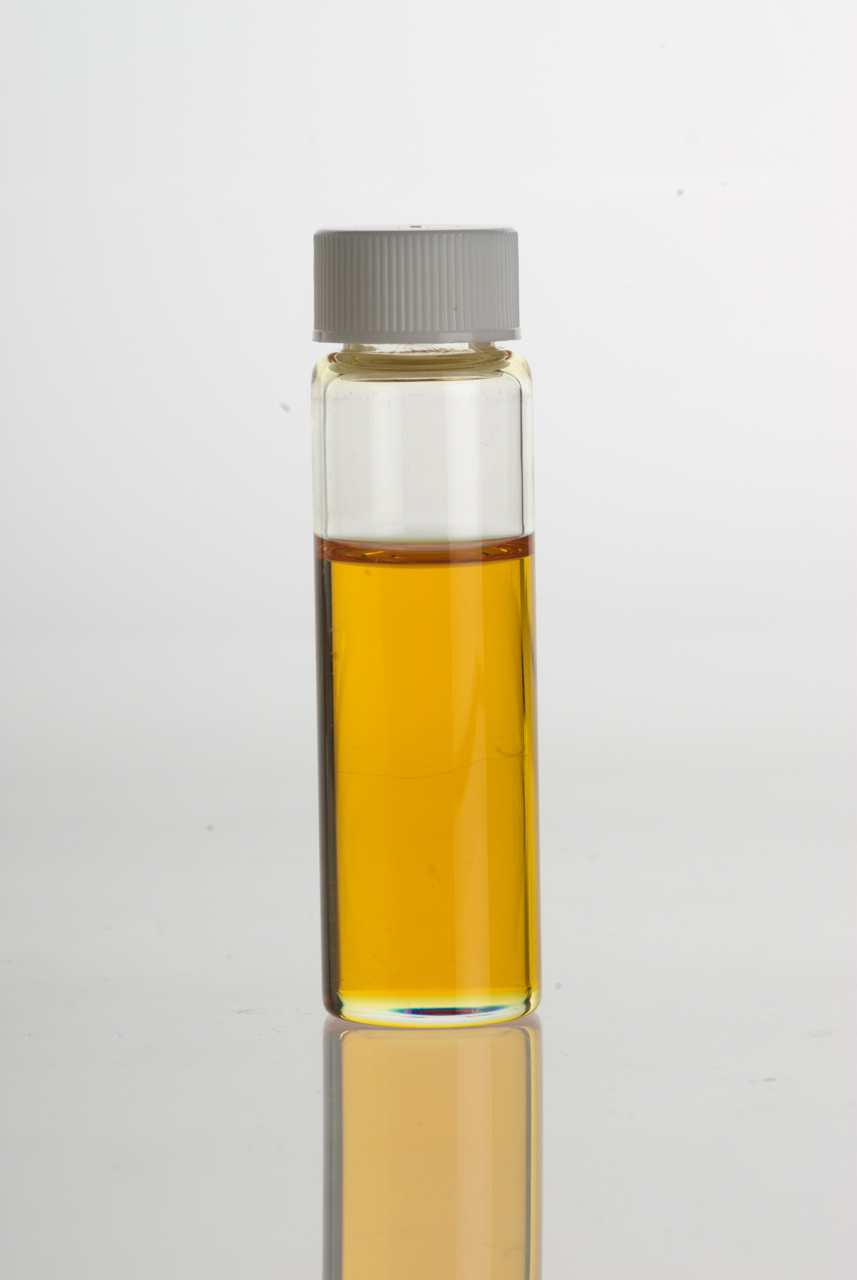
Lemon myrtle (Backhousia citriodora) essential oil in a clear glass vial

Aboriginal Australians have long used lemon myrtle, both in cuisine and as a healing plant. The oil has the highest citral purity; typically higher than lemongrass. It is also considered to have a "cleaner and sweeter" aroma than comparable sources of citral–lemongrass and Litsea cubeba. In 1888, Bertram first isolated the essential oil from B. citriodora. In 1925, it was found to be significantly germicidal, and it was later shown to be antimicrobial.

In the 1940s, Tarax was the first company to use B. citriodora oil as a lemon flavouring during World War II. In 1989, B. citriodora was investigated as a potential leaf spice and commercial crop by Peter Hardwick, who commissioned the Wollongbar Agricultural Institute to analyse B. citriodora selections using gas chromatography. In 2001, a Standards for Oil of B. citriodora was established by The Essential Oils Unit, Wollongbar, and Standards Australia.

=== Culinary ===
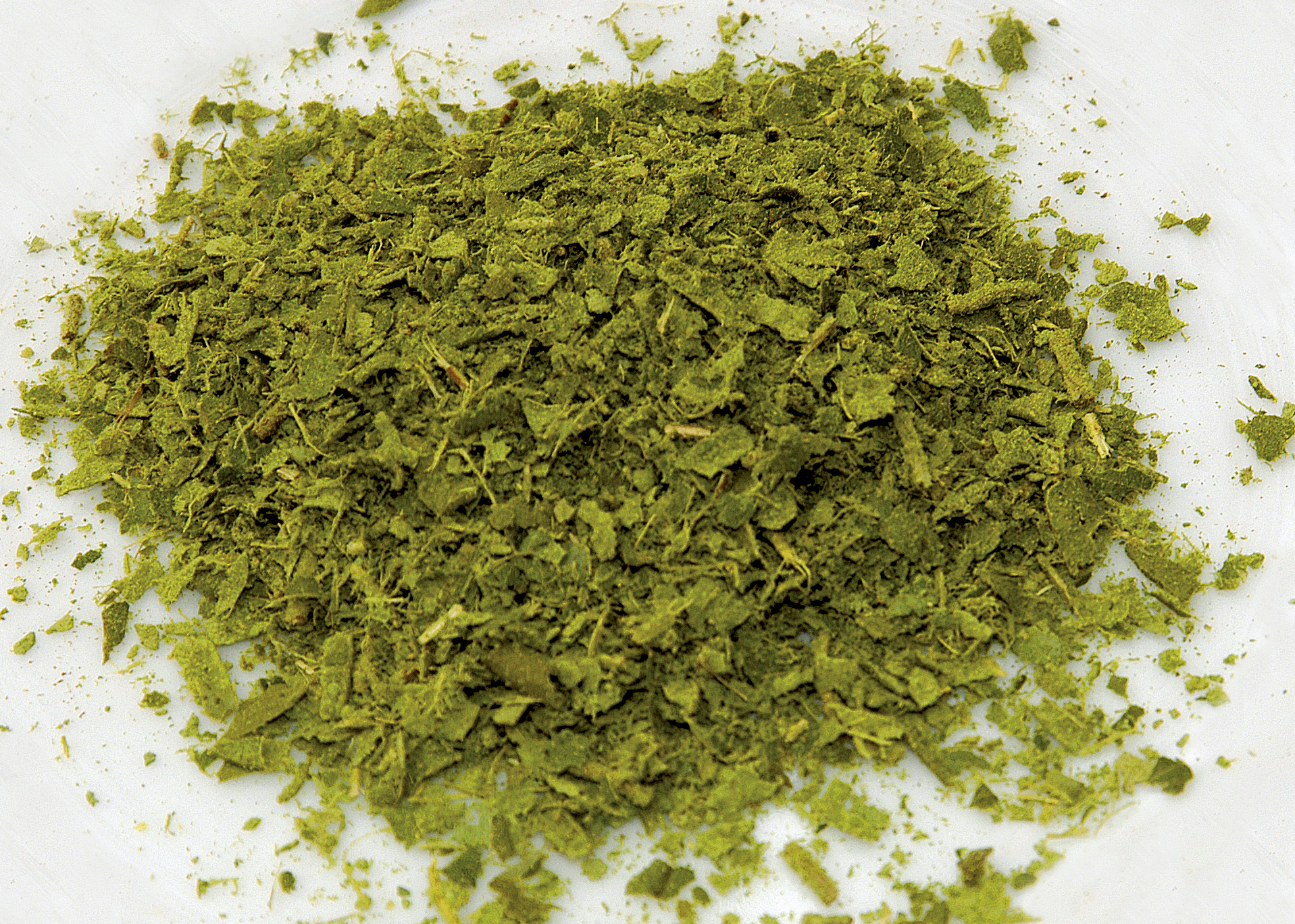
Dried and crushed lemon myrtle leaves

Lemon myrtle is one of the well known bushfood flavours and is sometimes referred to as the "Queen of the lemon herbs". The leaf is often used as dried flakes, or in the form of an encapsulated flavour essence for enhanced shelf-life. It has a range of uses, such as lemon myrtle flakes in shortbread; flavouring in pasta; whole leaf with baked fish; infused in macadamia or vegetable oils; and made into tea, including tea blends. It can also be used as a lemon flavour replacement in milk-based foods, such as cheesecake, lemon flavoured ice-cream and sorbet without the curdling problem associated with lemon fruit acidity.

Backhousia citriodora has two essential oil chemotypes. The citral chemotype is more prevalent and is cultivated in Australia for flavouring and essential oil. Citral as an isolate in steam distilled lemon myrtle oil is typically 90–98%, and oil yield 1–3% from fresh leaf. The citronellal chemotype is uncommon, and can be used as an insect repellent. The dried leaf has free radical scavenging ability.

=== Antimicrobial ===
Lemon myrtle essential oil possesses antimicrobial properties; however, the undiluted essential oil is toxic to human cells in vitro. When diluted to approximately 1%, absorption through the skin and subsequent damage is thought to be minimal. Lemon myrtle oil has a high Rideal–Walker coefficient, a measure of antimicrobial potency. Use of lemon myrtle oil as a treatment for skin lesions caused by molluscum contagiosum virus (MCV), a disease typically affecting children and immuno-compromised patients, has been investigated. Nine of sixteen patients who were treated with 10% strength lemon myrtle oil showed a significant improvement, compared to none in the control group. A study in 2003 which investigated the effectiveness of different preparations of lemon myrtle against bacteria and fungi concluded that the plant had potential as an antiseptic or as a surface disinfectant, or as an anti-microbial food additive. The oil is a popular ingredient in health care and cleaning products, especially soaps, lotions, skin-whitening preparations and shampoos.

== Cultivation ==
Lemon myrtle is a cultivated ornamental plant. It can be grown from tropical to warm temperate climates, and may handle cooler districts provided it can be protected from frost when young. In cultivation it rarely exceeds about 5 metres (16 ft) and usually has a dense canopy. The principal attraction to gardeners is the lemon smell, which perfumes both the leaves and flowers of the tree. Lemon myrtle is a hardy plant, which tolerates all but the poorest drained soils. It can be slow growing but responds well to slow-release fertilisers.

Seedling lemon myrtle go through a shrubby, slow juvenile growth stage, before developing a dominant trunk. Lemon myrtle can also be propagated from cutting, but is slow to strike. A study into the plant growing adventitious roots found that "actively growing axillary buds, wide stems and mature leaves" are good indicators that a cutting will take root successfully and survive. A further study on temperature recommended glasshouses for growing cuttings throughout the year. Growing cuttings from mature trees bypasses the shrubby juvenile stage. Cutting propagation is also used to provide a consistent product in commercial production.

In plantation cultivation the tree is typically maintained as a shrub by regular harvesting from the top and sides. Mechanical harvesting is used in commercial plantations. It is important to retain some lower branches when pruning for plant health. The harvested leaves are dried for leaf spice, or distilled for the essential oil.

The majority of commercial lemon myrtle is grown in Queensland and the north coast of New South Wales, Australia.

A 2009 study has suggested that drying lemon myrtle leaves at higher temperatures improves the citral content of the dried leaves, but discolours the leaves more.

== See also ==
- Citral
- Lemon verbena
