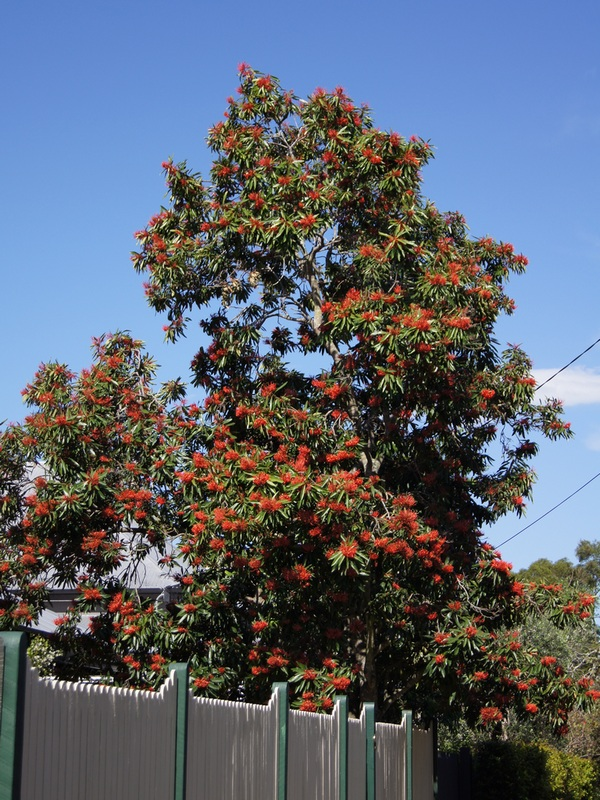

Conservation status
- Vulnerable (EPBC Act)

Scientific classification
- Kingdom: Plantae
- Clade: Tracheophytes
- Clade: Angiosperms
- Clade: Eudicots
- Order: Proteales
- Family: Proteaceae
- Genus: Alloxylon
- Species: A. flammeum

Binomial name
- Alloxylon flammeum P.H.Weston & Crisp
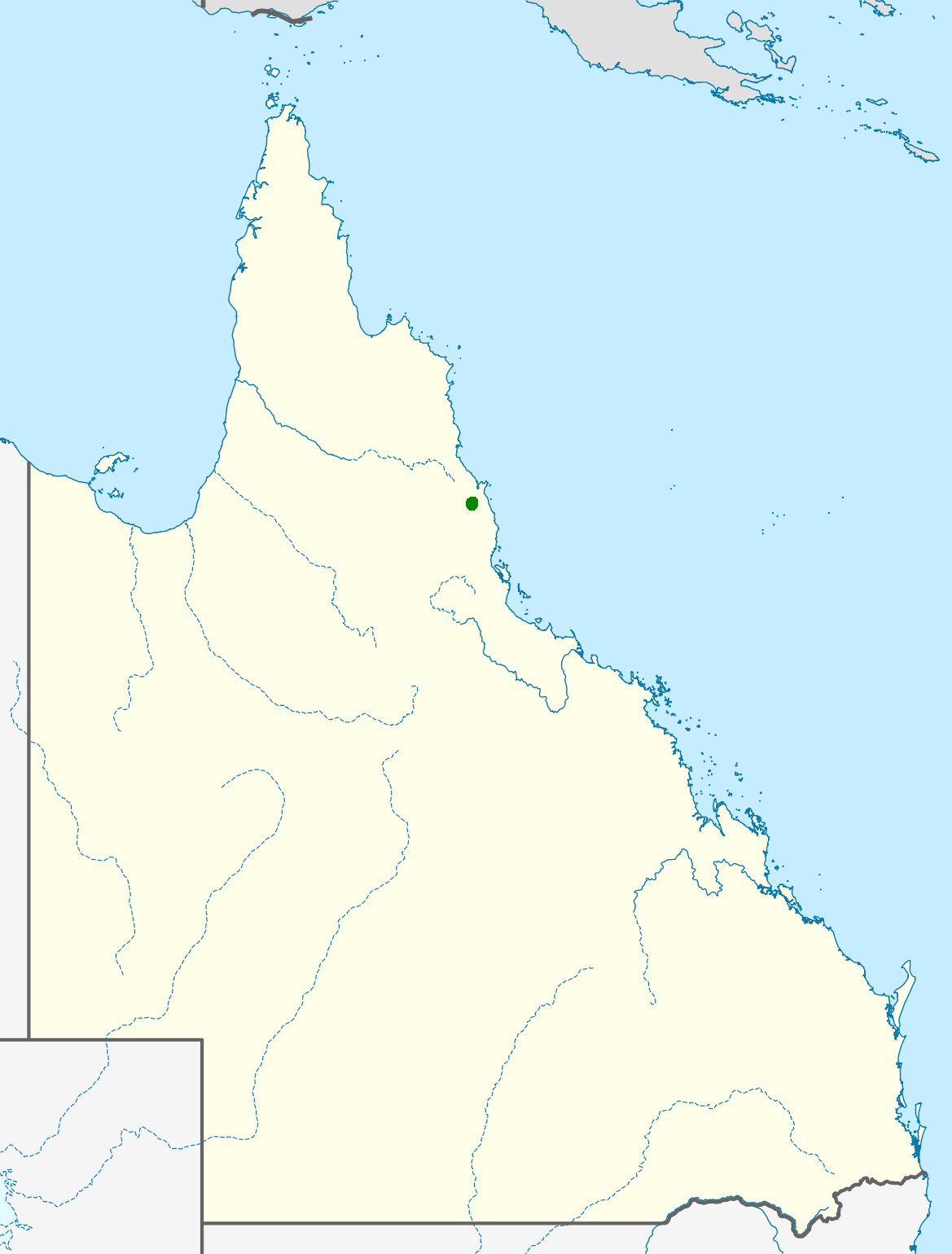
- Range of A. flammeum in north Queensland

= Alloxylon flammeum =

Species of tree native to Australia

Alloxylon flammeum, commonly known as the Queensland tree waratah or red silky oak, is a medium-sized tree of the family Proteaceae found in the Queensland tropical rain forests of northeastern Australia. It has shiny green elliptical leaves up to 18 cm (7.1 in) long, and prominent orange-red inflorescences that appear from August to October, followed by rectangular woody seed pods that ripen in February and March. Juvenile plants have large (up to 25 cm (9.8 in) long) deeply lobed pinnate leaves. Previously known as Oreocallis wickhamii, the initial specimen turned out to be a different species to the one cultivated and hence a new scientific name was required. Described formally by Peter Weston and Mike Crisp in 1991, A. flammeum was designated the type species of the genus Alloxylon. This genus contains the four species previously classified in Oreocallis that are found in Australasia.

Alloxylon flammeum is a canopy or emergent tree of the Mabi rainforest community of north Queensland. Its terminal tubular flowers indicate that the species is pollinated by birds. Readily adaptable to cultivation, Alloxylon flammeum prefers a site with good drainage and responds well to extra moisture and fertilisers low in phosphorus. It is listed nationally as vulnerable under the Australian Environment Protection and Biodiversity Conservation Act 1999 (EPBC Act) as most of its habitat has been cleared for agriculture and logging.

== Description ==
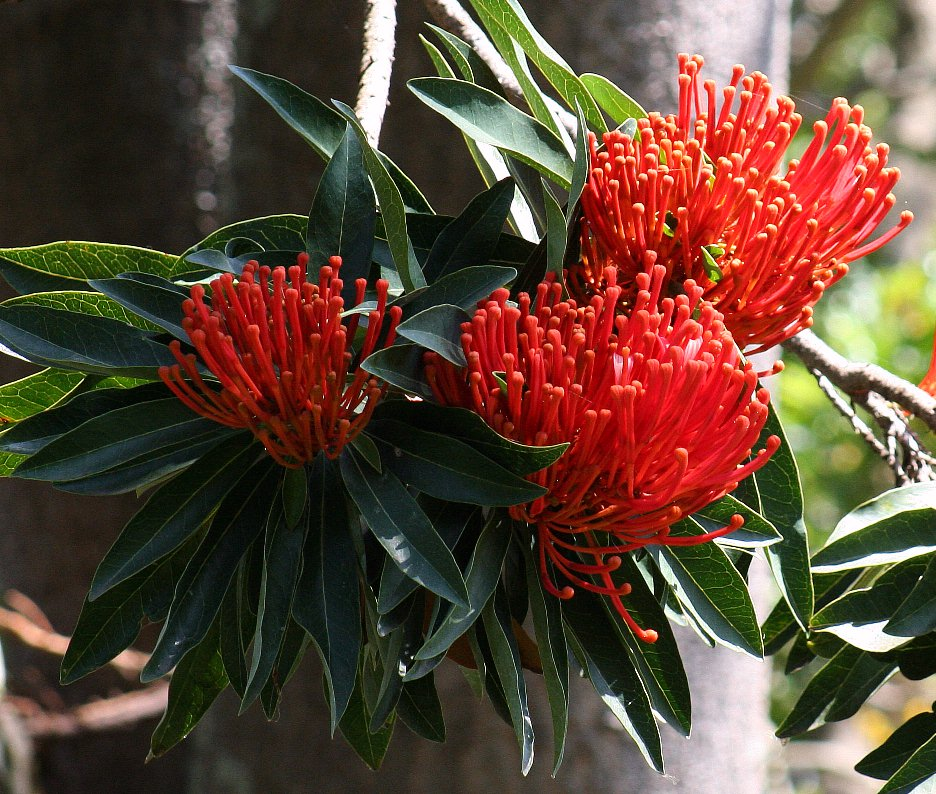
Inflorescences, Royal Botanic Gardens, Sydney

In nature, this is a rainforest tree that can reach 33 m (108 ft) in height with a diameter at breast height (dbh) of 0.6 m (24 in), although in cultivation 10 m (33 ft) is more likely. The trunk has light grey bark with brown lenticels. New branchlets and leaves are hairy. The green foliage consists of several distinct juvenile and adult leaf forms, which are arranged alternately along the stems. Very young plants begin with their first two to four leaves having two or three lobes, but then have narrow elliptic leaves with entire margins, measuring 6.5 to 18 cm (2.6 to 7.1 in) long and 1.3–2.2 cm (0.5–0.9 in) wide. These are then succeeded by pinnate juvenile leaves that have two to nine lobes arising at 30 to 40 degrees forwards, and reach 50 cm (20 in) long. They have prominent midveins along the midline of the main leaf and the lobes. The elliptic or obovate (egg-shaped) adult leaves are 8–25 cm (3–10 in) long and up to 4.5 cm (2 in) wide, and sit on 1.5 to 2.5 cm (0.6 to 1 in) long petioles.

Occurring in spring (August to October), the bright red or orange-red inflorescences are terminal and well displayed, and consist of anywhere from 10 to 52 individual flowers split into smaller groups of 2 to 20 flowers, arranged in a corymb. The flowers sit atop stalks (known as pedicels) up to 3.5 cm (1.4 in) in length, which arise in pairs off main horizontal stalks within the inflorescence. Each flower consists of a tubular perianth up to 4 cm (1.6 in) long, which partly splits along one side at anthesis to release the thick style. The stigma is contained within a slanting disc-like structure at the tip of the style. The tubular perianth splits into four segments at its tip, and the anther lies in the concave parts within each of these segments. The pedicel and the outer surface of the perianth are pubescent (covered in short fine fur). Flowers are followed by woody rectangular seed pods that sit on long stalks, and are 7–10 cm (2.8–3.9 in) long. Each pod contains 8 to 10 seeds, and is ripe in February and March. Each seed is separated from the others by a membranous separator, and has a long rectangular wing, which is much longer than the seed itself. The seedlings have obovate cotyledons that are 0.8–1 cm (0.3–0.4 in) wide by 1 cm (0.4 in) long.

Alloxylon flammeum can be distinguished from the co-occurring Alloxylon wickhamii by its hairy stems and petioles. It also has brighter flowers than the latter species. The New Guinean species A. brachycarpum resembles A. flammeum but has duller flowers, leaves that are shorter and wider, and fewer hairs on its perianth. A. pinnatum has pinnate (lobed) adult leaves and larger inflorescences made up of 50 to 140 individual flowers. It also has crimson pollen rather than the yellow of A. flammeum.

== Taxonomy ==
Foliage and bark of A. flammeum

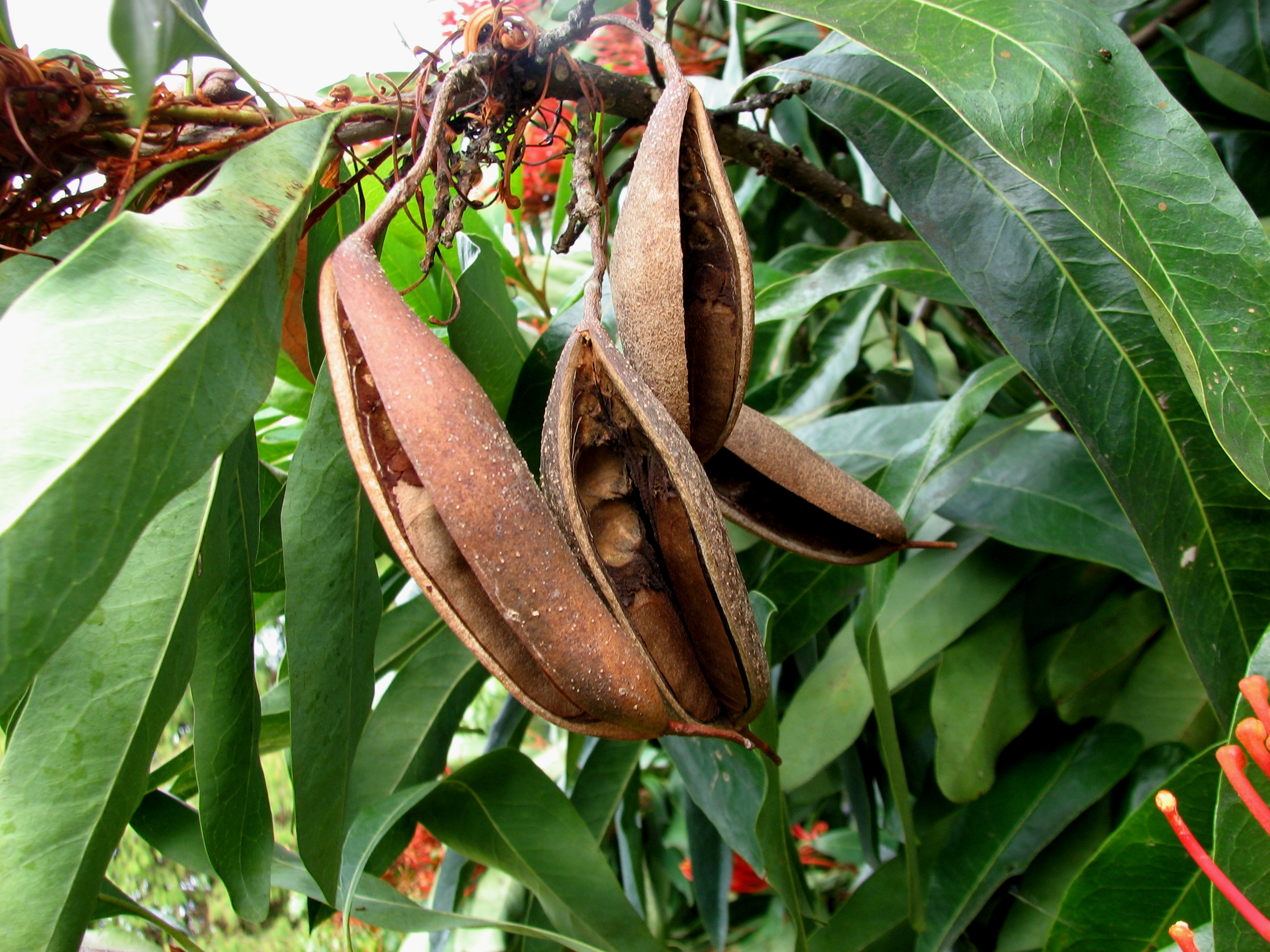
Adult foliage and opened seed pods

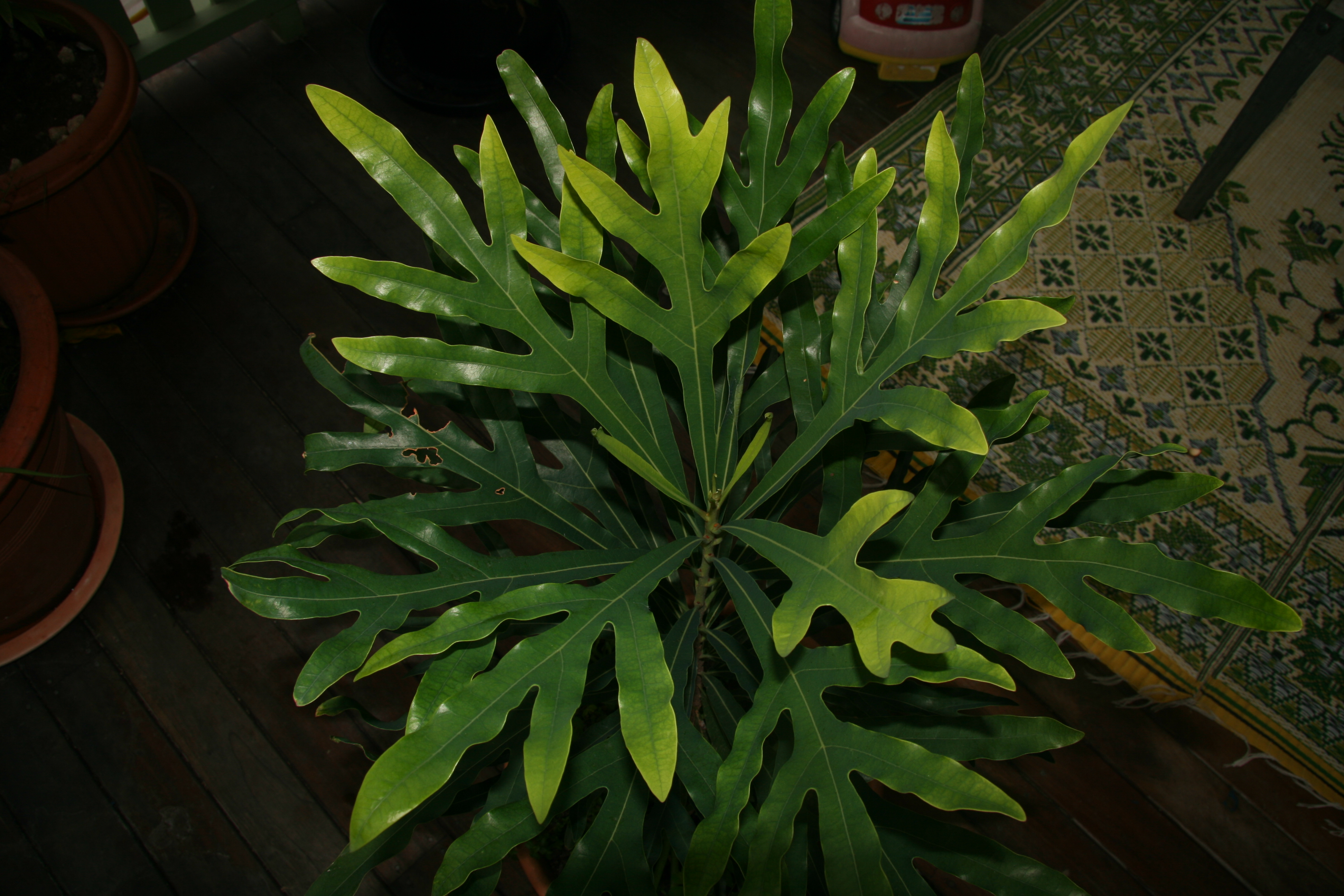
Immature, deeply lobed foliage

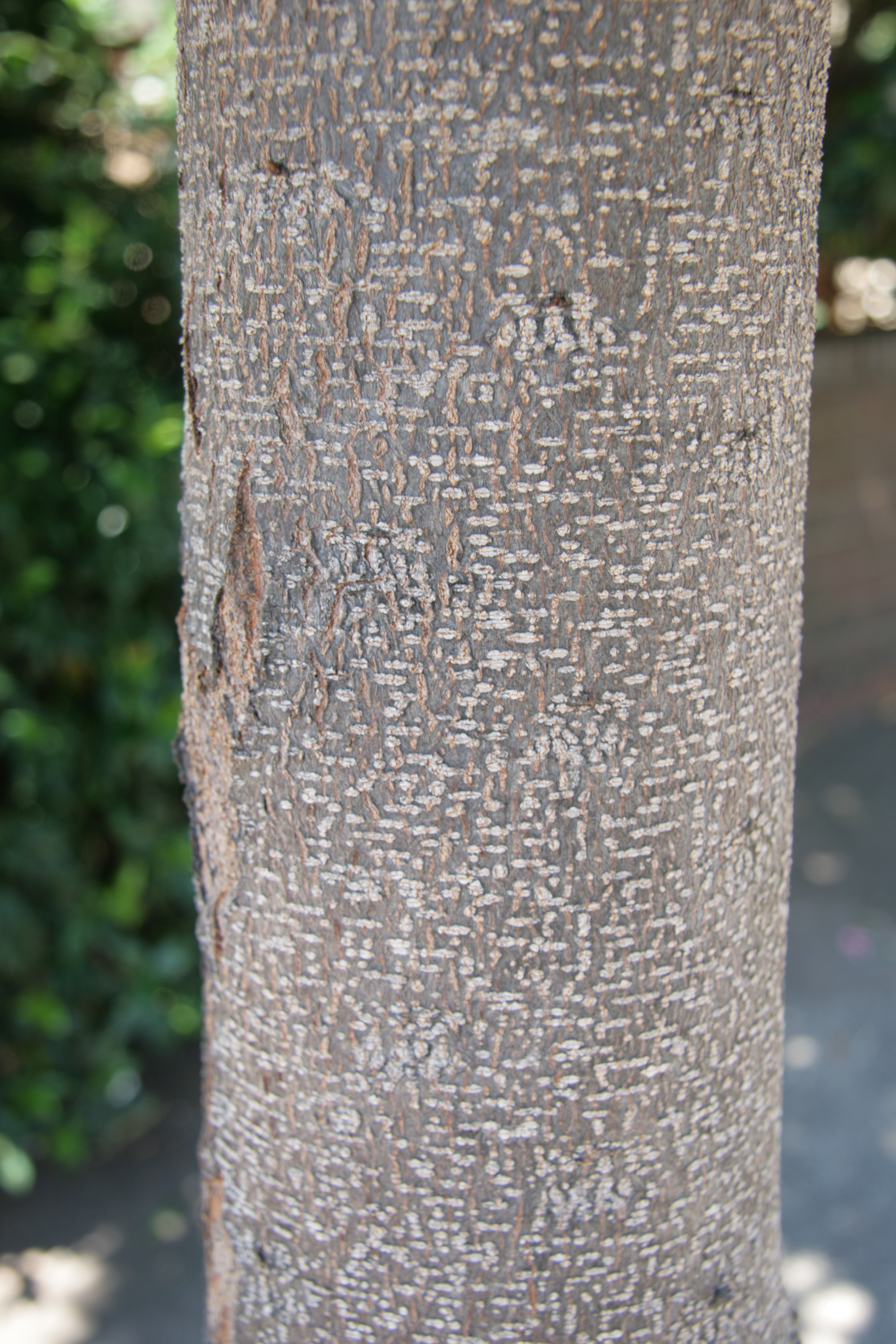
Grey trunk showing horizontal lenticels

For many years Alloxylon flammeum was mistakenly known as Embothrium (and later Oreocallis) wickhamii—Queensland botanist Frederick Manson Bailey had illustrated it using Embothrium wickhamii in the Queensland Agricultural Journal in 1899. Ferdinand von Mueller had described what is now known as Alloxylon wickhamii but also collected material of A. flammeum at Trinity Bay in 1881, not realising it was a separate species. It was only in the 1980s that botanists realised there were two species in the region—Oreocallis wickhamii and what became known as Oreocallis sp. nova. Peter Weston and Mike Crisp of the Royal Botanic Gardens in Sydney reviewed and recognised the Australian members of the genus Oreocallis as distinct from their South American counterparts, and hence reallocated them to the new genus Alloxylon in 1991. They coined the binomial name of Alloxylon flammeum, the type material having been collected by Garry Sankowsky and Peter Radke from Tolga Scrub in August 1987. Weston and Crisp designated it the type species of the genus Alloxylon. Aside from tree waratah, it has also been called the satin oak, pink silky oak, satin silky oak, red silky oak, red oak, lowland bull oak, and Queensland waratah. The genus name is derived from Ancient Greek allo- 'other' or 'strange' and xylon 'wood' and refers to their unusual cell architecture compared with the related genera Telopea and Oreocallis. The species name flammeum is Latin for 'flame-coloured'.

Alloxylon flammeum and the other three tree waratah species lie in the subtribe Embothriinae, along with the true waratahs (Telopea), South American Oreocallis, and Chilean firetree (Embothrium coccineum). Almost all these species have red terminal flowers, and hence the subtribe's origin and floral appearance most likely predate the splitting of Gondwana into Australia, Antarctica, and South America over 60 million years ago. The position, colour and tubular shape of the flowers suggest they are bird-pollinated, and have been so since the Eocene radiation of nectar-feeding birds such as honeyeaters. Cladistic analysis of morphological features within the Embothriinae showed A. flammeum and A. brachycarpum to be sister species, with A. wickhamii as their next closest relative. A. flammeum has yellow pollen grains like A. brachycarpum and A. wickhamii but unlike all other members of the Embothriinae.

== Distribution and habitat ==
A plant species of the Wet Tropics bioregion, Alloxylon flammeum is found on the Atherton Tablelands in Far North Queensland at altitudes of 700 to 820 m (2,300 to 2,700 ft) above sea level. Its range is from Danbulla to the upper Barron River, though most of its rainforest habitat has been cleared for agriculture, and it is found in protected remnants such as Mount Hypipamee National Park, Danbulla National Park, Crater Lakes National Park, Curtain Fig National Park, and Hallorans Hill Conservation Park. Found on basalt- or granite-based soil, it is a component of complex notophyll vine forest or rainforest, where it is a canopy or emergent tree. This forest, also known as Mabi forest, has an uneven canopy layer to around 45 m (148 ft) and significant scrub understory. Here, Alloxylon flammeum is found with such species as candlenut (Aleurites rockinghamensis), Argyrodendron spp., fishtail lawyer cane (Calamus caryotoides), rose maple (Cryptocarya onoprienkoana), shining-leaved stinging tree (Dendrocnide photiniphylla), fig trees (Ficus spp.), Queensland maple (Flindersia brayleyana), cabbage crowsfoot (Franciscodendron laurifolium), northern brush mahogany (Geissois biagiana), Atherton turkey bush (Hodgkinsonia frutescens), and red cedar (Toona ciliata).

== Conservation status ==
Alloxylon flammeum is listed nationally as vulnerable under the Australian Environment Protection and Biodiversity Conservation Act 1999 (EPBC Act), which indicates that there is a high risk it will become extinct in the wild in the mid-term future. Before the establishment of the EPBC Act, it was, and currently remains, listed as vulnerable under the Queensland Government's Nature Conservation Act. Furthermore, it was listed by the International Union for Conservation of Nature (IUCN) in 1997. Most of its habitat has been cleared for agriculture and development. Remaining stands in protected areas are highly fragmented. Furthermore, plants in cultivation are likely to come from a limited genetic pool. With under 2% of its original extent remaining, the rainforest is threatened by invasive plants and grazing by feral and domestic animals.

== Cultivation ==
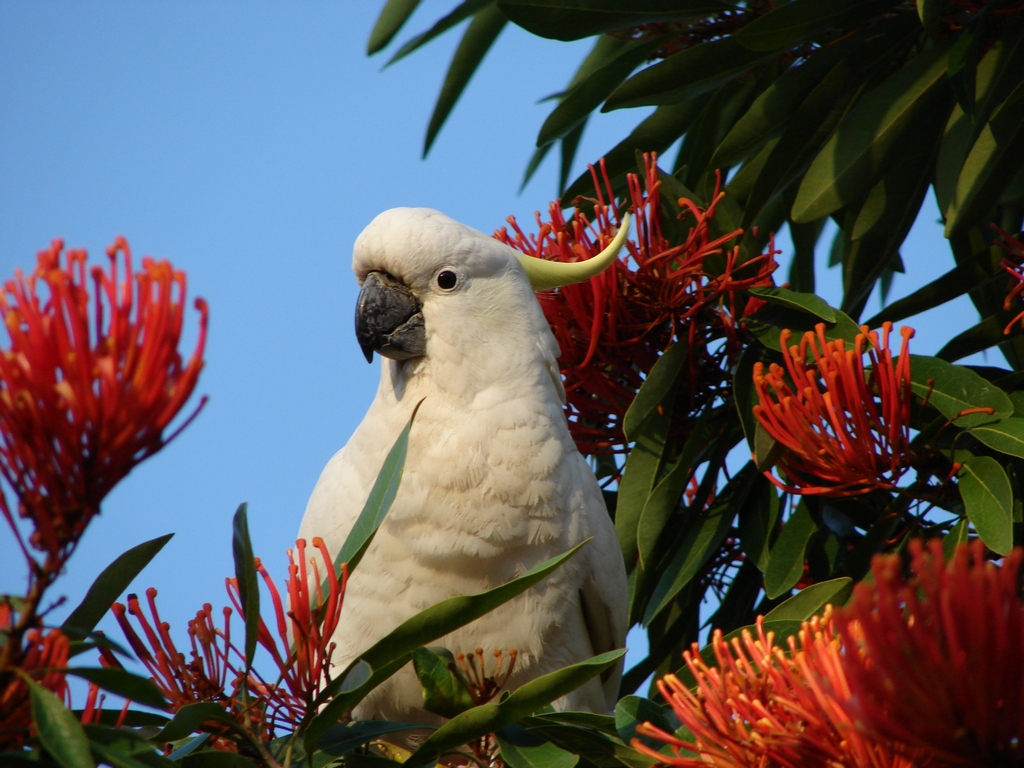
Sulphur-crested cockatoo in foliage

Although it is not widely cultivated, Alloxylon flammeum has proven to be by far the most hardy and adaptable (as well as the showiest) member of the genus Alloxylon, and has been grown successfully in as cool a climate as Victoria. It does best in a well-drained soil rich in organic material but low in phosphorus with some shelter when young. Applying mulch to the soil around the plant and extra water in dry spells is beneficial. Fertilisers high in phosphorus content can damage the plant, though fertilisers specifically for Australian native plants can be used. Yellowing of new leaves may indicate chlorosis from iron deficiency and can be remedied with iron chelate or iron sulphate. Its flowers attract birds to gardens. A large tree grows in the Royal Botanic Gardens in Sydney. It is thought that there are more plants in cultivation than there are in the wild.

Propagation is generally by seed although semi-hardened cuttings have also been successful. Cuttings can be slow to strike, and the resulting plants may have weak root systems early on and need to be supported with stakes. Semi-hardened cuttings have been most successful in experiments applying the rooting hormone indole-3-butyric acid at 8000 milligrams per litre concentration, intermittent misting, and a warmer root temperature of 24 °C (75 °F). Plants grown from seed may take seven or eight years to flower, with flowering occurring soon after the foliage changes from juvenile to adult leaves. An alternative method used has been to graft mature scions onto young stock to combine a strong root system with material capable of flowering quickly. The species has also been considered as a rootstock for the considerably harder to grow A. pinnatum. Alloxylon flammeum has potential as a cut flower crop. Its soft silky timber resembles that of oak and is highly regarded.
