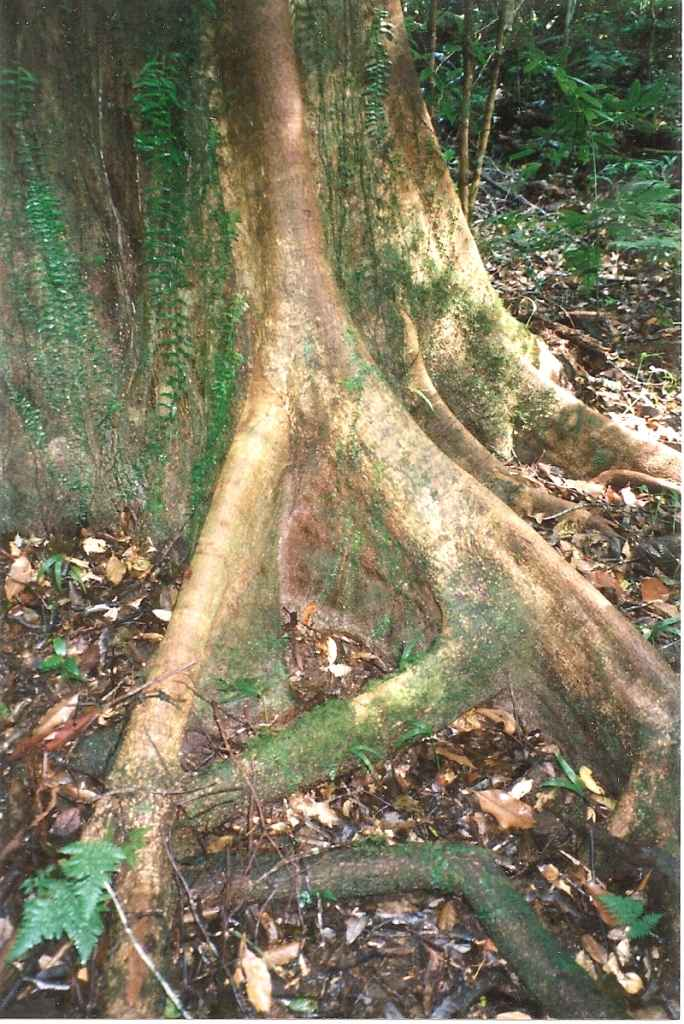
- Red carabeen - buttressed roots, Wilson River, Australia

Conservation status
- Least Concern (IUCN 3.1)

Scientific classification
- Kingdom: Plantae
- Clade: Tracheophytes
- Clade: Angiosperms
- Clade: Eudicots
- Clade: Rosids
- Order: Oxalidales
- Family: Cunoniaceae
- Genus: Karrabina
- Species: K. benthamiana

Binomial name
- Karrabina benthamiana (F.Muell.) Rozefelds & H.C.Hopkins

Synonyms
- Geissois benthamiana F.Muell.; Geissois benthami spelling variant by F.Muell.; Weinmannia benthamiana (F.Muell.) F.Muell.; Geissois benthamii spelling variant by A.D.Chapm.

= Karrabina benthamiana =

Species of tree

Karrabina benthamiana is a species of rainforest trees, growing naturally in north–eastern New South Wales and south–eastern Queensland (mid. eastern coastal region), Australia. They have common names including red carabeen, leather jacket, brush mahogany, red bean, pink marara and brush mararie. This species used to be placed in the genus Geissois as Geissois benthamiana.

== Habitat ==
Common in warm temperate and sub tropical rainforest areas, often seen in mountain gullies. It grows from near the Manning River area in New South Wales to near Tamborine Mountain, south eastern Queensland.

== Description ==
The Red Carabeen is a large tree to around 35 metres tall, and 140 cm in diameter. The trunk is round in cross section and often buttressed at the base. Bark is a wrinkly brown.

Leaves are pinnate and opposite with three leaflets. Leaflets significantly toothed. 5 to 15 cm long, smooth and green on both surfaces, darker above. New growth is bright red.

The midrib and lateral leaf veins are evident on both surfaces, conspicuously raised beneath. Twelve to sixteen net veins ending in a leaf tooth.

Flowers appear from October to January being yellow, in a slender raceme. The fruit is a downy capsule; almost cylindrical. Several flat seeds in each cell of the two cells in the capsule. Ripe from May to August, or irregular. Unlike many Australian rainforest trees, seed germination occurs rapidly.

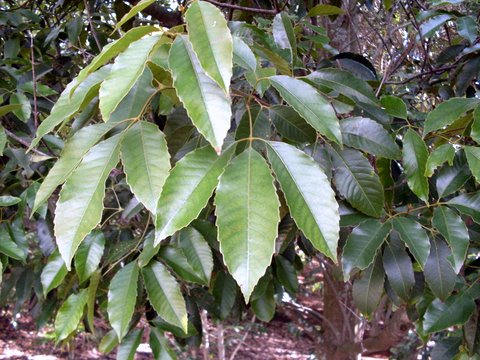
Red Carabeen foliage from Nightcap National Park, Australia
