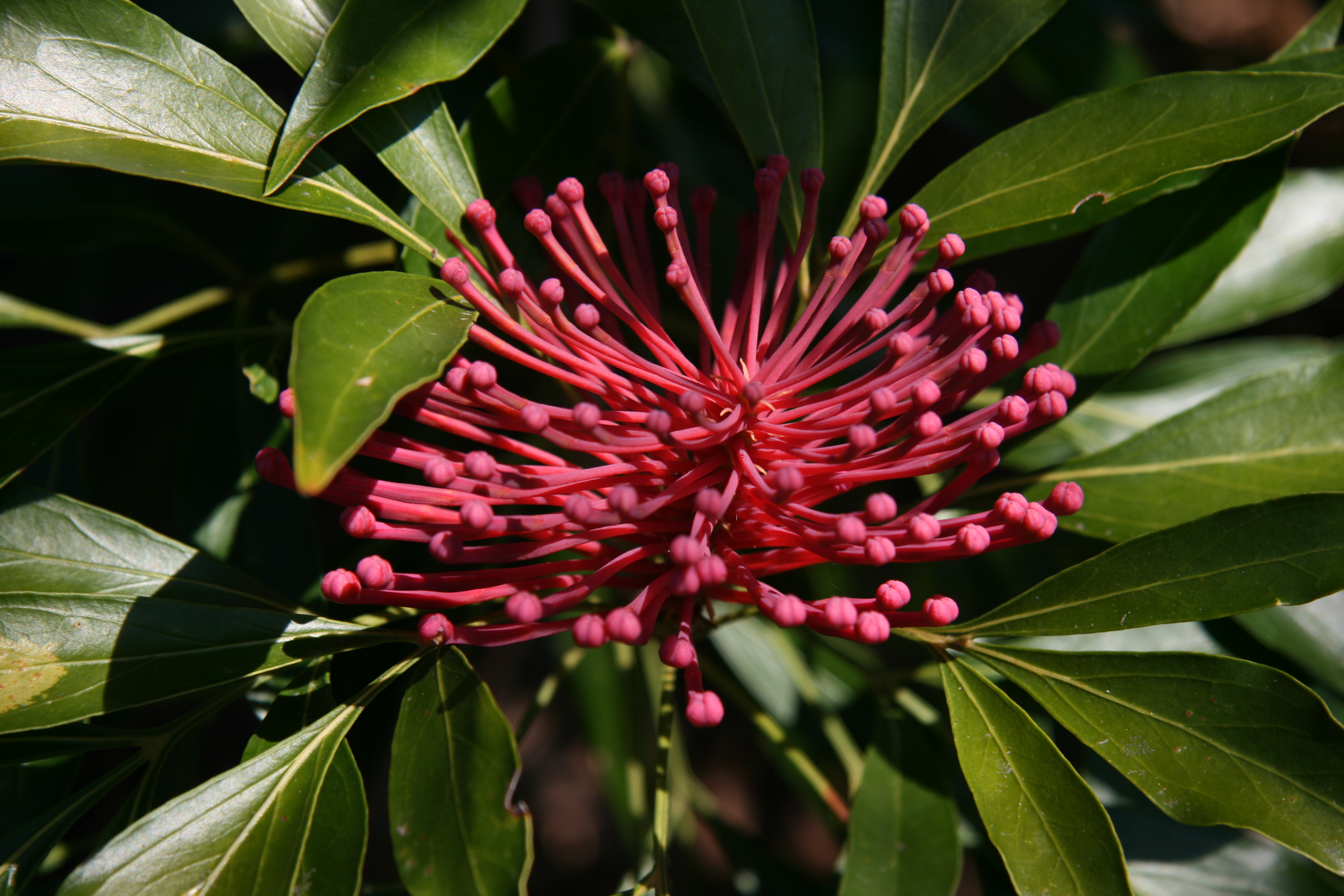

Scientific classification
- Kingdom: Plantae
- Clade: Tracheophytes
- Clade: Angiosperms
- Clade: Eudicots
- Order: Proteales
- Family: Proteaceae
- Genus: Alloxylon
- Species: A. pinnatum

Binomial name
- Alloxylon pinnatum (Maiden & Betche) P.H.Weston & Crisp
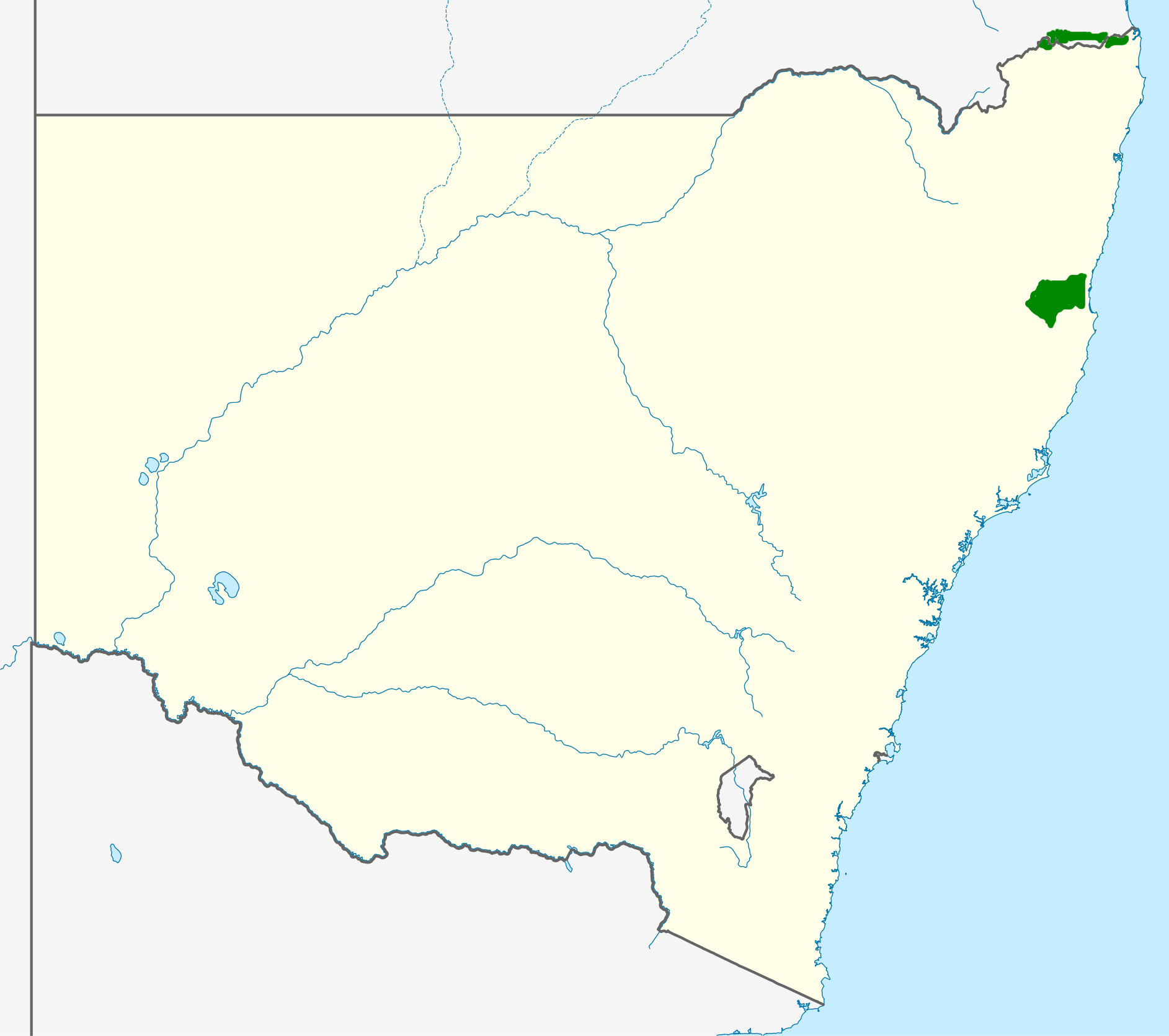
- Range of A. pinnatum in northern New South Wales and southeastern Queensland

Synonyms
- Oreocallis pinnata (Maiden & Betche) Sleumer; Embothrium wickhamii var. pinnatum Maiden & Betche; Embothrium pinnatum (Maiden & Betche) C.T.White

= Alloxylon pinnatum =

Species of tree native to Australia

Alloxylon pinnatum, known as Dorrigo waratah, is a tree of the family Proteaceae found in warm-temperate rainforest of south-east Queensland and northern New South Wales in eastern Australia. It has shiny green leaves that are either pinnate (lobed) and up to 30 cm (12 in) long, or lanceolate (spear-shaped) and up to 15 cm (5.9 in) long. The prominent pinkish-red flower heads, known as inflorescences, appear in spring and summer; these are made up of 50 to 140 individual flowers arranged in corymb or raceme. These are followed by rectangular woody seed pods, which bear two rows of winged seeds.

Known for many years as Oreocallis pinnata, it was transferred to the new genus Alloxylon by Peter Weston and Mike Crisp in 1991. This genus contains the four species previously classified in Oreocallis that are found in Australasia. Its terminal globular flowers indicate that the species is pollinated by birds. Classified as near threatened under the Queensland Nature Conservation Act 1992, the Dorrigo waratah has proven difficult to keep alive in cultivation.

== Description ==
The Dorrigo waratah is a rainforest tree that reaches 25 m (82 ft) high, with a non-buttressed trunk of 1.5 m (5 ft) diameter at breast height (dbh). The bark is greyish brown and covered in many small pimples, rendering it sandpaper-like in texture. The green foliage consists of several distinct juvenile and adult leaf forms, which are arranged alternately along the stems. Juvenile leaves are light green and at first simple, with a single blade. Successive leaves on more mature plants become more complex, or pinnate, with deep lobes; these leaves are up to 30 cm (12 in) long with 2–11 leaflets. Some adult leaves are simple—with a single lanceolate leaf blade—and up to 15 cm (5.9 in) long; these are generally located near the flower heads. Among the green foliage there are occasional yellow leaves. New branchlets and leaves are covered in brown hair.

The pinkish-red compound flower heads, known as inflorescences, are up to 20 cm (8 in) across in spring to summer, and contain between 50 and 140 smaller flowers, arranged in a corymb or raceme. These individual flowers are 3–3.8 cm (1.2–1.5 in) long and sit atop stalks (pedicels) up to 3.5 cm (1.4 in) in length, which arise in pairs off the main stalk within the inflorescence. Each flower consists of a tubular perianth, which partly splits along one side at anthesis to release the thick style. The stigma is contained within a slanting disc-like structure at the tip of the style. The tubular perianth splits into four segments at its tip, and the anther lies in the concave parts within each of these segments. The flower parts are smooth and hairless. The pollen is crimson. After flowering, the 8–10 cm (3.1–3.9 in) long woody seedpod develops. Cylindrical in shape, it splits down one side to release the seeds, which are ripe from February to June. They are arranged in two rows, with at least four seeds in each row. Each seed is separated from the others by a membranous separator, and has a long rectangular wing, which is much longer than the seed itself.

The Dorrigo waratah can be distinguished from other members of the genus Alloxylon by its pinnate adult leaves. This feature serves to differentiate it as other species in the genus have simple adult leaves. The other species have inflorescences with fewer flowers (50 maximum), and have yellow pollen.

== Taxonomy ==
First described as a variety of what was then known as Embothrium wickhamii by Joseph Maiden and Ernst Betche in 1911 after a collection by J.L.Boorman, the Dorrigo waratah was raised to species status and reclassified as Oreocallis pinnata by Dutch botanist Hermann Otto Sleumer in 1954. The Australian members of the genus Oreocallis were recognised as markedly distinct from the South American species, which saw them allocated to the new genus Alloxylon. Hence, Oreocallis pinnata was given the new combination Alloxylon pinnatum in 1991 by Peter Weston and Mike Crisp of the Royal Botanic Gardens in Sydney. The species name refers to the pinnate leaves. Aside from Dorrigo waratah, it has also been called the Dorrigo oak, red silky oak, tree waratah, pink silky oak, red oak, Queensland waratah, and waratah oak. The genus name is derived from Ancient Greek allo- meaning 'other' or 'strange', and xylon 'wood'. It refers to the genus's unusual cell architecture compared with the related genera Telopea and Oreocallis.

A. pinnatum and the other three tree waratah species lie in the subtribe Embothriinae, along with the true waratahs (Telopea), Oreocallis and the Chilean firetree (Embothrium coccineum) from South America. Almost all these species have red flowers that are terminal (arising at the ends of branches), and hence the subtribe's origin and floral appearance most likely predates the splitting of the supercontinent Gondwana into Australia, Antarctica, and South America over 60 million years ago. The position, colour and tubular shape of the flowers suggest that they are bird-pollinated, and have been so since the radiation of nectar-feeding birds such as honeyeaters in the Eocene. Triporopollenites ambiguus is an ancient member of the Proteaceae known only from pollen deposits, originally described from Eocene deposits in Victoria. The fossil pollen closely resembles that of the Tasmanian waratah (Telopea truncata), A. pinnatum and Oreocallis grandiflora. Cladistic analysis of morphological features within the Embothriinae showed A. pinnatum to be the earliest offshoot within the genus and sister to the other three species. Along with members of other genera in the Embothriinae, A. pinnatum has crimson pollen, while the other three Alloxylon species have yellow pollen. Hence the ancestral pollen colour was likely red, and remained so with the emergence of the genus Alloxylon, yet changed to yellow after the divergence of A. pinnatum.

== Distribution and habitat ==
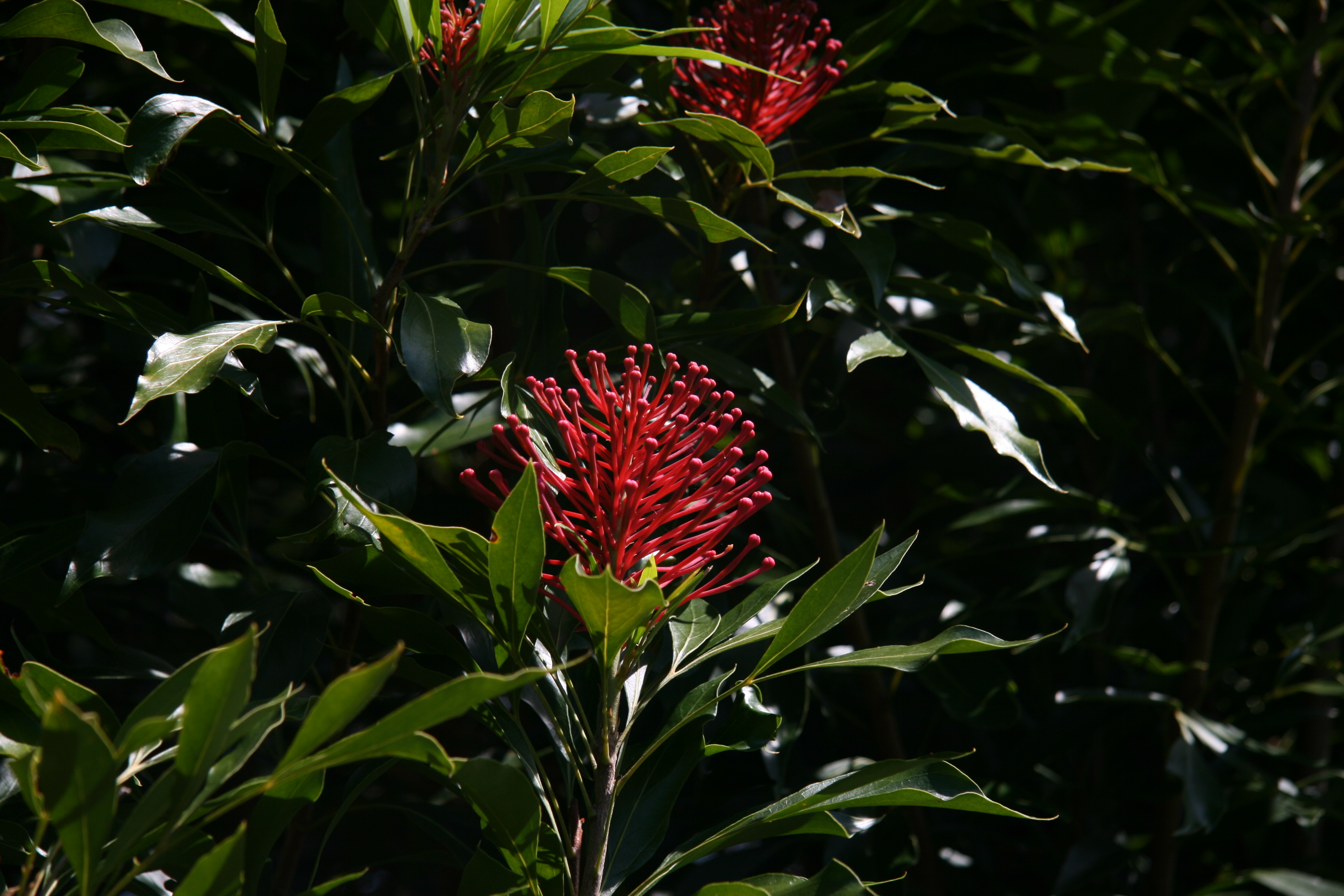
Cultivated at Maleny, Queensland

The Dorrigo waratah is found in warm-temperate rainforest from altitudes of 700 to 1,250 m (2,300 to 4,100 ft) along the McPherson Range in south-east Queensland and the Dorrigo Plateau in northern New South Wales, with dominant tree species, such as coachwood (Ceratopetalum apetalum) and Antarctic beech (Nothofagus moorei). In Queensland it is associated with golden sassafras (Doryphora sassafras) and native crabapple (Schizomeria ovata). It commonly grows on southern aspects of hills and slopes.

== Conservation status ==
The Dorrigo waratah is classified as 3RCa under the Rare or Threatened Australian Plant (ROTAP) criteria for threatened species, and listed as near threatened under the Queensland Nature Conservation Act 1992. The flowers are visited by the rare Richmond birdwing butterfly (Ornithoptera richmondia), which occurs in the same region. In April 2016, the Dorrigo waratah was one of eleven species selected for the Save a Species Walk campaign; scientists walked 300 km (190 mi) to raise money for collection of seeds to be prepared and stored at the Australian PlantBank at the Australian Botanic Garden, Mount Annan. Protected areas in New South Wales in which it grows include Bellinger River National Park and Dorrigo National Park.

== Cultivation ==
The bright, prominently displayed flowers and bird-attracting properties of the Dorrigo waratah make it a desirable garden plant. It reaches only about 6–10 m (20–33 ft) in cultivation, but has proven difficult to grow. The Dorrigo waratah has been successfully cultivated at the Australian National Botanic Gardens in Canberra in a sheltered position in part-shade with a thick layer of mulch. It is propagated most easily by seed, which is ripe from February to June and keeps for around twelve months. Seedlings often perish when they reach 15 cm (6 in) high, and are difficult to transplant. It has also been grown at Mount Tomah Botanic Garden, where it was noted to be exacting in its requirements, needing very good drainage as well as a sheltered location to survive. It is slow growing; specimens planted in 1989 have been flowering since 1999. The considerably easier to grow Queensland tree waratah (A. flammeum) has been considered as a stock plant for grafting. The pinkish red timber has been used for making cabinets and furniture. It is soft and light, weighing 500 kg (1100 lb) per cubic metre. The cut flowers have a long vase life.
