= Alloxylon brachycarpum =

Conservation status
- Endangered (IUCN 2.3)

Scientific classification
- Kingdom: Plantae
- Clade: Tracheophytes
- Clade: Angiosperms
- Clade: Eudicots
- Order: Proteales
- Family: Proteaceae
- Genus: Alloxylon
- Species: A. brachycarpum

Binomial name
- Alloxylon brachycarpum (Sleumer) P.H.Weston & Crisp

Synonyms
- Embothrium brachycarpum Sleumer; Oreocallis brachycarpa (Sleumer) Sleumer

Species of plant from Indonesia and Papua New Guinea

Alloxylon brachycarpum is a species of flowering plant in the family Proteaceae. It is a tree endemic to New Guinea. It is threatened by habitat loss.

== Description ==
Alloxylon brachycarpum grows as a tree reaching 20–40 m (66–131 ft) high, with a rough, flaking grey to brown trunk. The adult leaves are simple and oval shaped, measuring 6–15 cm (2.4–5.9 in) long by 2.5–5 cm (1.0–2.0 in) wide with entire margins. The orange-red flower heads each contain 8 to 25 individual flowers arranged in racemes. These are followed by the development of the leathery seed pods, or fruit, up to 14 cm (5.5 in) long and 2.5 cm (1.0 in) wide, each of which contain 10-14 winged seeds in two rows. It resembles the Australian species A. flammeum, which has longer, narrower leaves and brighter flowers.

== Taxonomy ==
Dutch botanist Herman Sleumer described this species as Embothrium brachycarpum in 1939 before transferring it to the genus Oreocallis. However the fruit of the type specimen were deformed and the species in fact has the largest fruit of the genus.

Peter Weston and Mike Crisp of the Royal Botanic Gardens in Sydney reviewed and recognised the Australasian members of the genus Oreocallis as distinct from their South American counterparts, and hence reallocated them to the new genus Alloxylon in 1991.

Local native names include kawoli in Merauke, and anga in Trangan.

== Distribution and habitat ==
Alloxylon brachycarpum is found in dry rainforests and eucalypt-bamboo forests in southern New Guinea, along the Upper Merauke River, Lower Fly River and Oriomo River, and in the Aru Islands. New Guinea is politically divided between Indonesia and Papua New Guinea. Its ecological community is threatened by logging.
