= Metrosideros tabwemasanaensis =

Conservation status
- Endangered (IUCN 3.1)

Scientific classification
- Kingdom: Plantae
- Clade: Tracheophytes
- Clade: Angiosperms
- Clade: Eudicots
- Clade: Rosids
- Order: Myrtales
- Family: Myrtaceae
- Genus: Metrosideros
- Species: M. tabwemasanaensis

Binomial name
- Metrosideros tabwemasanaensis Pillon (2018)

Species of flowering plant

Metrosideros tabwemasanaensis is species of plant in the family Myrtaceae. It is a tree endemic to Mount Tabwemasana on the island of Espiritu Santo in Vanuatu.

== Description ==
Metrosideros tabwemasanaensis is an evergreen tree, growing from 5 to 20 meters tall. It has an irregular flat-topped crown and is sympodially branched, and occasionally has a coppiced form. Bark is dark grey to dark brown on twigs, and light grey and flaky on the trunk. Wood is hard and reddish in color. Leaves are leathery, 2–3 mm long by 1.5–3 mm wide, with reddish petioles. Young leaves and twigs are covered in fine silky grey hair.

Flowers are on compound inflorescences. They are typically on a pair of primary axes branching from the twig, each axis bearing two to three pairs of lateral triads, with a single peduncle and three small red flowers on each triad. Fruits are 4 mm long by 5 mm wide.

It most closely resembles Metrosideros vitiensis, which is also native to Espiritu Santo. It differs in having almost sessile leaves with a cordate base.

== Range and habitat ==
Metrosideros tabwemasanaensis is known only from Mount Tabwemasana, the highest peak on the island of Espiritu Santo and in Vanuatu. It grows on ridges in upper montane forests from 1500 to 1870 meters elevation, in association with Pterophylla spp., Syzygium spp., Geissois denhamii, Quintinia spp., and Ascarina spp.

Its habitat is relatively intact, and located away from human settlements and activity.
