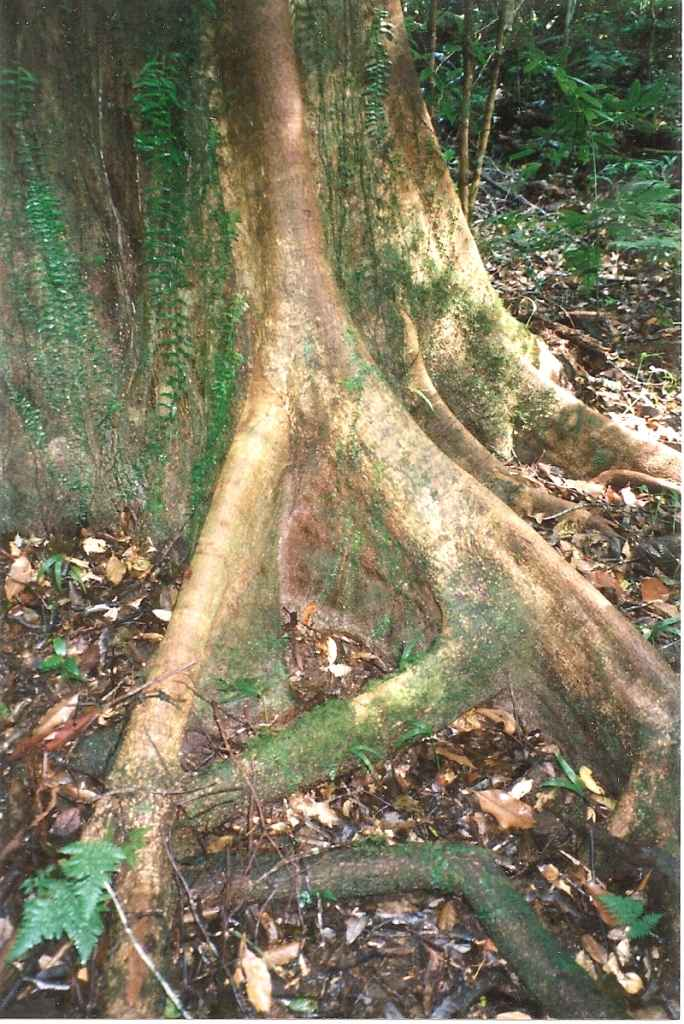
- Karrabina benthamiana - buttressed roots, Wilson River, Australia

Scientific classification
- Kingdom: Plantae
- Clade: Tracheophytes
- Clade: Angiosperms
- Clade: Eudicots
- Clade: Rosids
- Order: Oxalidales
- Family: Cunoniaceae
- Genus: Karrabina; Rozefelds & H.C.Hopkins

= Karrabina =

Genus of trees

Karrabina is a genus of trees in the family Cunoniaceae. It is endemic to eastern Australia and includes two species, Karrabina benthamiana and Karrabina biagiana, which were previously placed in the genus Geissois.

== Gallery ==
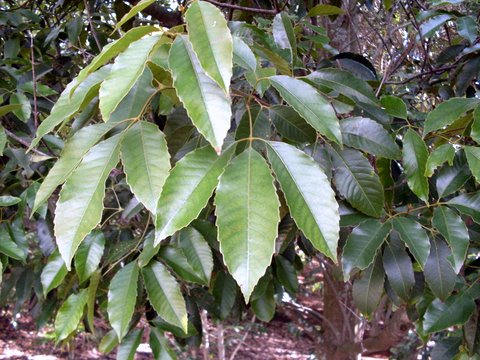
Karrabina benthamiana foliage

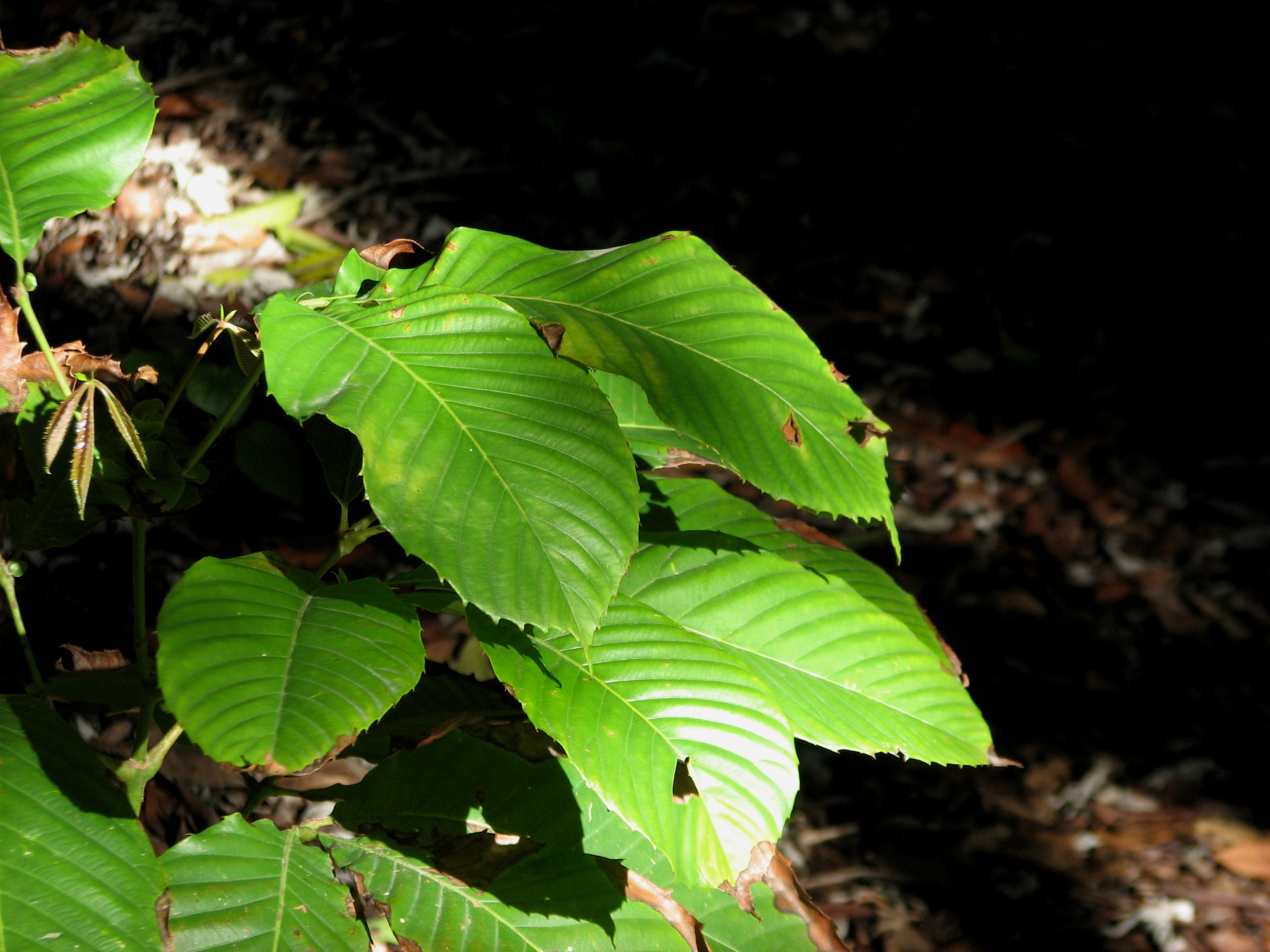
Karrabina biagiana foliage
