= Geissois superba =

Conservation status
- Least Concern (IUCN 3.1)

Scientific classification
- Kingdom: Plantae
- Clade: Tracheophytes
- Clade: Angiosperms
- Clade: Eudicots
- Clade: Rosids
- Order: Oxalidales
- Family: Cunoniaceae
- Genus: Geissois
- Species: G. superba

Binomial name
- Geissois superba Gillespie

Species of tree

Geissois superba is a species of flowering plant in the family Cunoniaceae. It is a forest tree endemic to Fiji.
