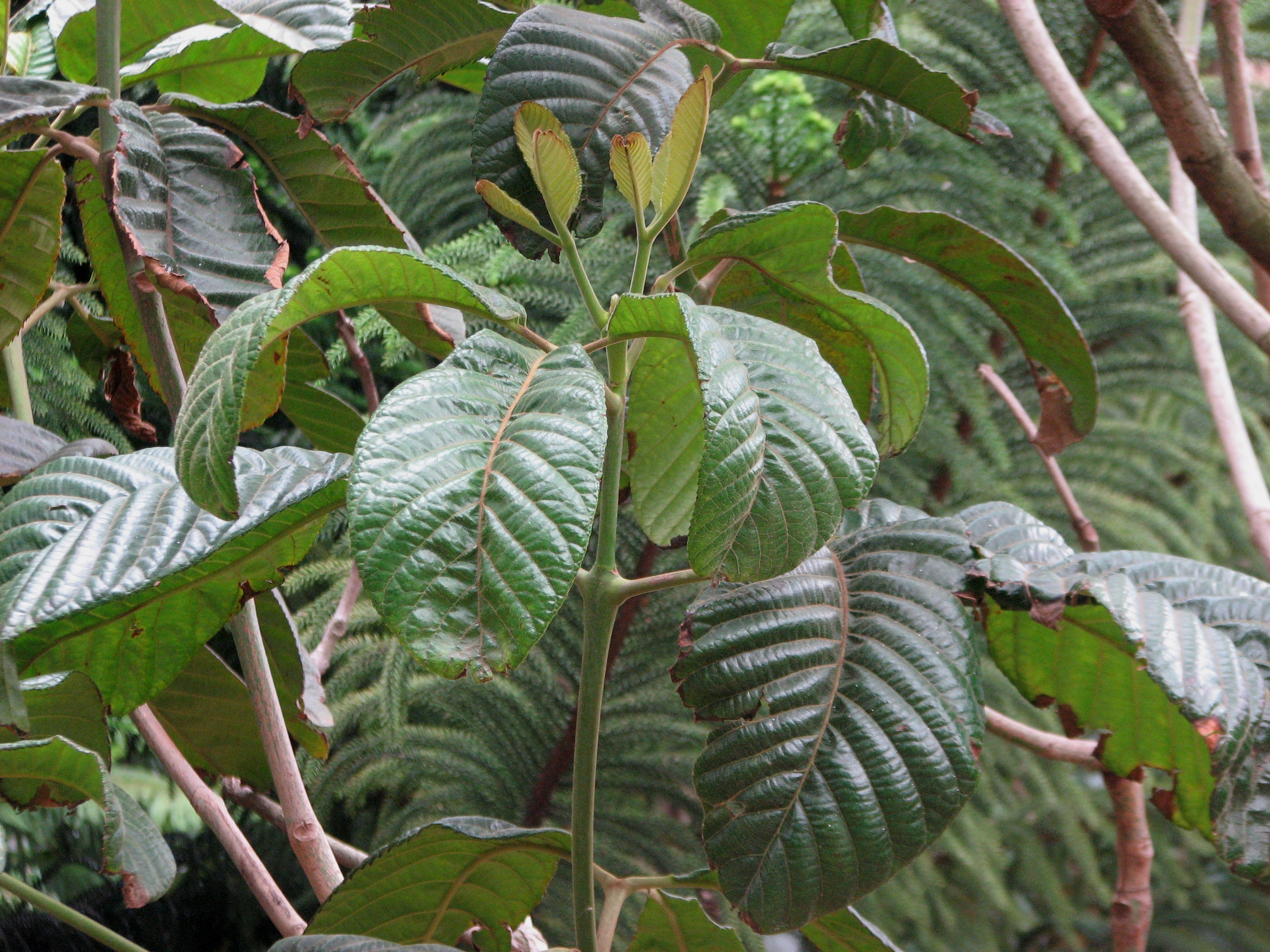

Conservation status
- Least Concern (IUCN 3.1)

Scientific classification
- Kingdom: Plantae
- Clade: Tracheophytes
- Clade: Angiosperms
- Clade: Eudicots
- Clade: Rosids
- Order: Oxalidales
- Family: Cunoniaceae
- Genus: Geissois
- Species: G. hirsuta

Binomial name
- Geissois hirsuta Brongn. & Gris

= Geissois hirsuta =

Species of flowering plant

Geissois hirsuta is a tree species that is endemic to New Caledonia. It is known locally as geissois velu. It is native to the central and southern portion of Grande Terre, New Caledonia's main island, from the Tiwaka River and Mont Tchingou in the north to Goro in the south. It grows in dense humid rain forest, including forest edges, forest undergrowth, and gallery forest on various substrates, from sea level to 500 metres elevation.
