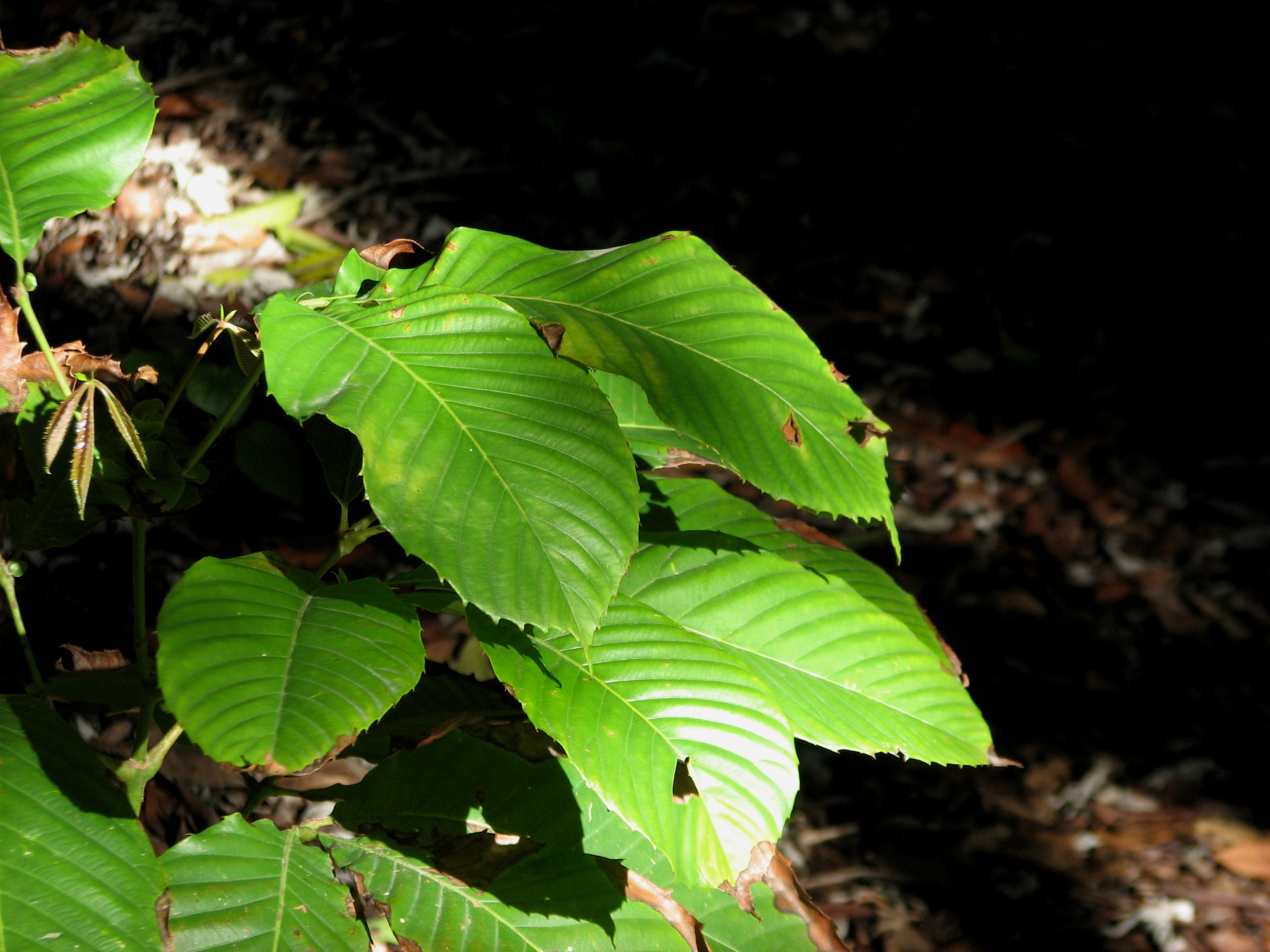

Conservation status
- Least Concern (IUCN 3.1)

Scientific classification
- Kingdom: Plantae
- Clade: Tracheophytes
- Clade: Angiosperms
- Clade: Eudicots
- Clade: Rosids
- Order: Oxalidales
- Family: Cunoniaceae
- Genus: Karrabina
- Species: K. biagiana

Binomial name
- Karrabina biagiana (F.Muell.) Rozefelds & H.C. Hopkins

Synonyms
- Geissois biagiana (F.Muell.) F.Muell.; Weinmannia biagiana F.Muell.; Windmannia biagiana (F.Muell.) Kuntze

= Karrabina biagiana =

Species of tree

Karrabina biagiana is a species of large rainforest trees commonly known as northern brush mahogany, northern brush mararie or red carabeen, in the plant family Cunoniaceae. This species used to be placed in the genus Geissois as Geissois biagiana.

These trees are endemic to the wet tropics rainforests of northeastern Queensland, Australia. Within the Wet Tropics region they occur widely in the mature, luxuriant tropical rainforests, from approximately 100 to 1,100 m (330 to 3,610 ft) elevation and have greater abundance along streamlines.

Mature trees have large buttresses and grow to over 30 m (100 ft) tall. The compound leaves occur opposite each other and consist of three large toothed leaflets measuring 11 cm–20 cm × 4 cm–8 cm (4.3 in–7.9 in × 1.6 in–3.1 in). Large prominent stipules occur at the points of attachment of the leaves to the stem. New growth has showy bright red leaves and stems. Near or at the ends of growing new branches, compound racemose inflorescences bloom many individual small cream flowers, each measuring 3–4 mm (0.1–0.2 in) diameter. Capsules covered in short hairs, measuring 10–12 mm (0.4–0.5 in) long, open when ripe, releasing many small winged seeds.

The timber has value for building purposes.

The trees are becoming more well known in cultivation, for the striking foliage and blossom events.
