= Geissois stipularis =

Conservation status
- Least Concern (IUCN 3.1)

Scientific classification
- Kingdom: Plantae
- Clade: Tracheophytes
- Clade: Angiosperms
- Clade: Eudicots
- Clade: Rosids
- Order: Oxalidales
- Family: Cunoniaceae
- Genus: Geissois
- Species: G. stipularis

Binomial name
- Geissois stipularis A.C.Sm.

Species of tree

Geissois stipularis is a species of flowering plant in the family Cunoniaceae. It is a forest tree, 5 to 15 metres tall, which is endemic to Fiji. It is native to the island of Viti Levu, where it grows in dense and open dry forests and moist forests from 50 to 900 metres elevation.
