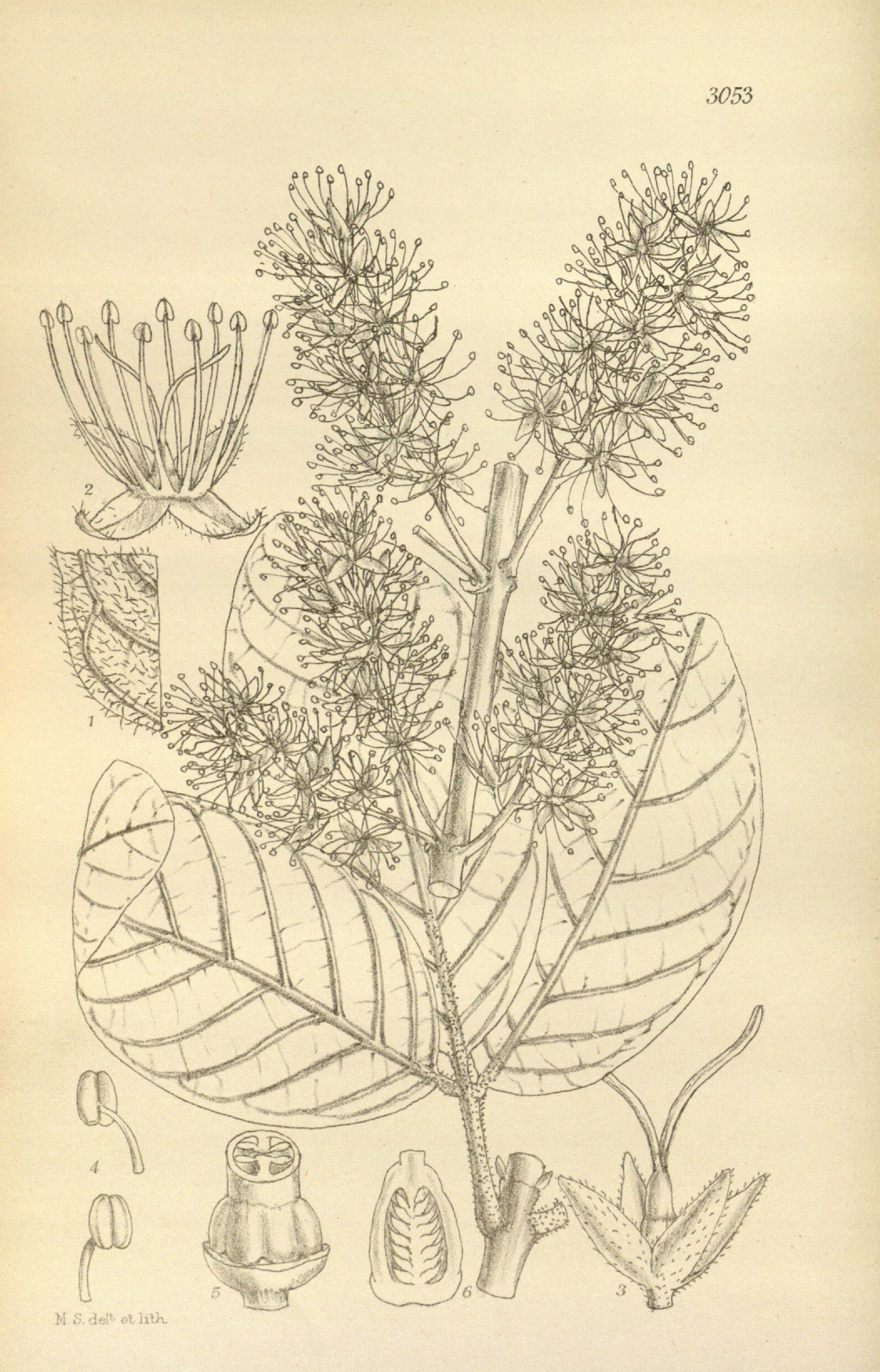

Conservation status
- Least Concern (IUCN 3.1)

Scientific classification
- Kingdom: Plantae
- Clade: Tracheophytes
- Clade: Angiosperms
- Clade: Eudicots
- Clade: Rosids
- Order: Oxalidales
- Family: Cunoniaceae
- Genus: Geissois
- Species: G. imthurnii

Binomial name
- Geissois imthurnii Turrill

= Geissois imthurnii =

Species of tree

Geissois imthurnii is a species of forest tree belonging to the plant family Cunoniaceae. It is endemic to Fiji.
