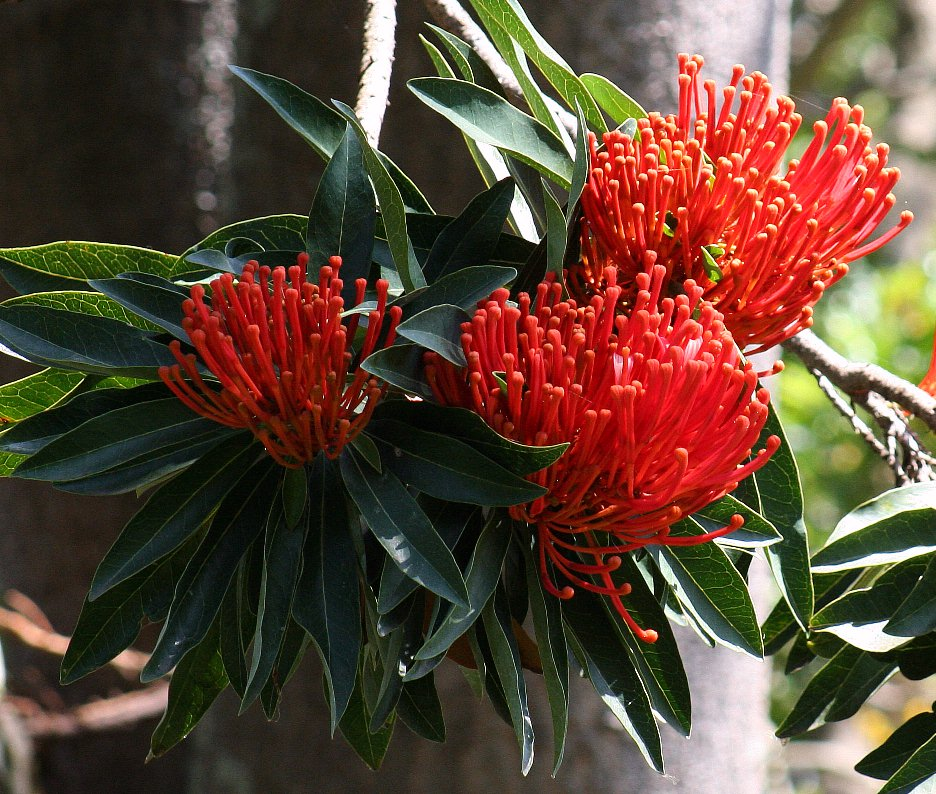
- A. flammeum, Royal Botanic Gardens, Sydney

Scientific classification
- Kingdom: Plantae
- Clade: Tracheophytes
- Clade: Angiosperms
- Clade: Eudicots
- Order: Proteales
- Family: Proteaceae
- Subfamily: Grevilleoideae
- Tribe: Embothrieae
- Subtribe: Embothriinae
- Genus: Alloxylon; P.H.Weston & Crisp

Type species
- Alloxylon flammeum P.H.Weston & Crisp

Species
- See text

= Alloxylon =

Genus of trees native to Australia

Alloxylon is a genus of four species in the family Proteaceae of mainly small to medium-sized trees. They are native to the eastern coast of Australia, with one species, A. brachycarpum, found in New Guinea and the Aru Islands. The genus is a relatively new creation, being split off from Oreocallis in 1991. The name is derived from Ancient Greek allo- "other" or "strange" and xylon or "wood" due to their unusual cell architecture compared with the related genera Telopea and Oreocallis. In Australia, they are known as tree waratahs due to similarities in the inflorescences between them and the closely related Telopea.

== Classification ==
Together with Telopea, Oreocallis and Embothrium, Alloxylon makes up a small group of terminal often red-flowering showy plants scattered around the southern edges of the Pacific Rim. Known as the subtribe Embothriinae, this is an ancient group with roots in the mid Cretaceous, when Australia, Antarctica and South America were linked by land.

== Cultivation ==
They are grown for their showy flowers. Their large size and, in some cases, lengthy time to flower from seed, has limited their availability as garden plants. However, Alloxylon flammeum has proven adaptable and hardy, while the others are more exacting in their requirements. All do best in a well-drained soil rich in organic material but low in phosphorus with some shelter when small.

== Species ==
- Alloxylon brachycarpum (Sleumer) P.H.Weston & Crisp
- Alloxylon flammeum P.H.Weston & Crisp (type species) (previously Oreocallis wickhamii)
- Alloxylon pinnatum (Maiden & Betche) P.H.Weston & Crisp
- Alloxylon wickhamii (W.Hill & F.Muell.) P.H.Weston & Crisp
