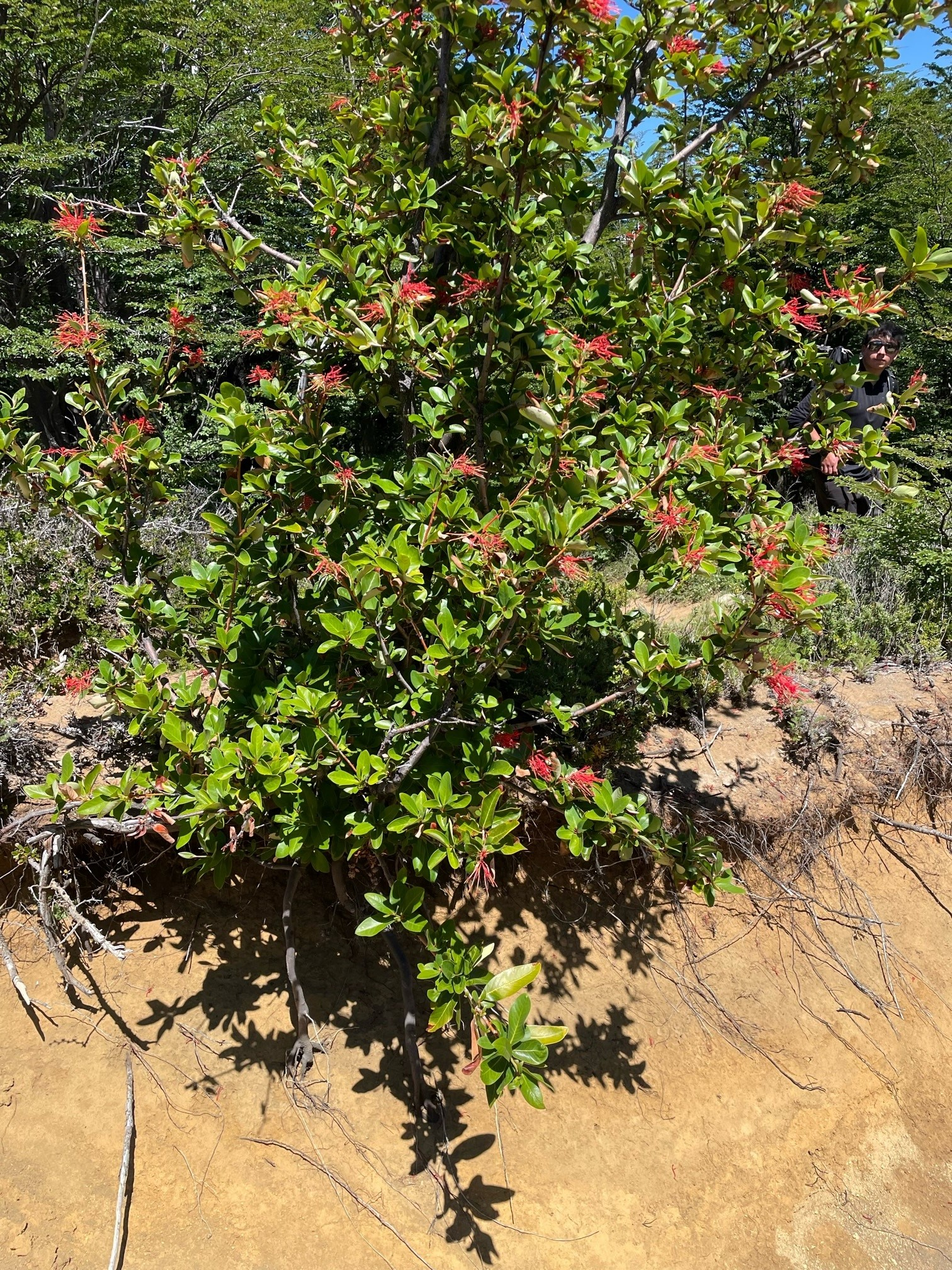
- Embothirum bush in flower, at Cerro Castillo National Park, Chile.

Scientific classification
- Kingdom: Plantae
- Clade: Embryophytes
- Clade: Tracheophytes
- Clade: Angiosperms
- Clade: Eudicots
- Order: Proteales
- Family: Proteaceae
- Subfamily: Grevilleoideae
- Tribe: Embothrieae
- Subtribe: Embothriinae
- Genus: Embothrium; J.R.Forst. & G.Forst.

Species
- See text

= Embothrium =

Genus of trees

Embothrium is a genus of two to eight species (depending on taxonomic interpretation) in the plant family Proteaceae, native to southern South America, in Chile and adjacent western Argentina; the genus occurs as far south as Tierra del Fuego. Common names include Chilean firebush in English, notro in Argentina, ciruelillo, fosforito or notro chileno in Chilean Spanish.

They are large shrubs or trees growing to 10–20 m tall with a trunk up to 70 cm diameter. E. coccineum and perhaps others, is also highly prone to suckering and unmanaged plants often form dense groves of many suckering shoots. The leaves are evergreen, occasionally deciduous in cold areas, 5–12 cm long and 2–4 cm broad. The flowers are produced in dense bunches, brilliant red (rarely white or yellow), tubular, 2.5-4.5 cm long, split into four lobes near the apex which reflex to expose the stamens and style.

== Systematics ==
One or possibly two extant species are recognised. Two further species, ?E. precoccineum and ?E. pregrandiflorum, have been described from the Ventana Formation (Middle Eocene) from Patagonia, although their placement in Embothrium is uncertain as they are insufficiently known.

== Species ==
- Embothrium coccineum J. R. Forst. & G. Forst. Chile, Argentina.
- Embothrium lanceolatum Ruiz & Pav. (syn. E. coccineum var. lanceolatum (Ruiz & Pav.) O.Kuntze). Chile, Argentina; doubtfully distinct from E. coccineum.
- †Embothrium nebulosum Stover & Partridge (previously Granodiporites nebulosus) Tertiary, southeastern Australia
- †Embothrium precoccineum Berry (Middle Eocene fossils from the Ventana Formation, near Río Pichileufú, Río Negro Province, Argentina)
- †Embothrium pregrandiflorum Berry (Middle Eocene fossils from the Ventana Formation near Río Pichileufú, Río Negro Province, Argentina)

== Classification ==
Together with Telopea, Oreocallis and Alloxylon, Embothrium makes up a small group of terminal often red-flowering showy plants scattered around the southern edges of the Pacific Rim. Known as the Embothriinae, this is an ancient group with roots in the mid Cretaceous, when Australia, Antarctica and South America were linked by land. Almost all these species have red terminal flowers, and hence the subtribe's origin and floral appearance must predate the splitting of Gondwana into Australia, Antarctica, and South America over 60 million years ago.

== Pollinators ==
The prominent position and striking colour of many species within the subtribe both in Australia and South America strongly suggest they are adapted to pollination by birds, and have been for over 60 million years. In Argentine Patagonia, E. coccineum is pollinated by hummingbirds (green-backed firecrown) and insects (tangle-veined flies and sweat bees).

== Cultivation and uses ==
Embothrium coccineum is grown as an ornamental plant for its vivid red flowers. It is only successful in oceanic climates, which away from its native area includes western Europe (mainly the British Isles and the Faroe Islands), the coast of the Pacific Northwest of North America, and New Zealand, and Mediterranean climates.

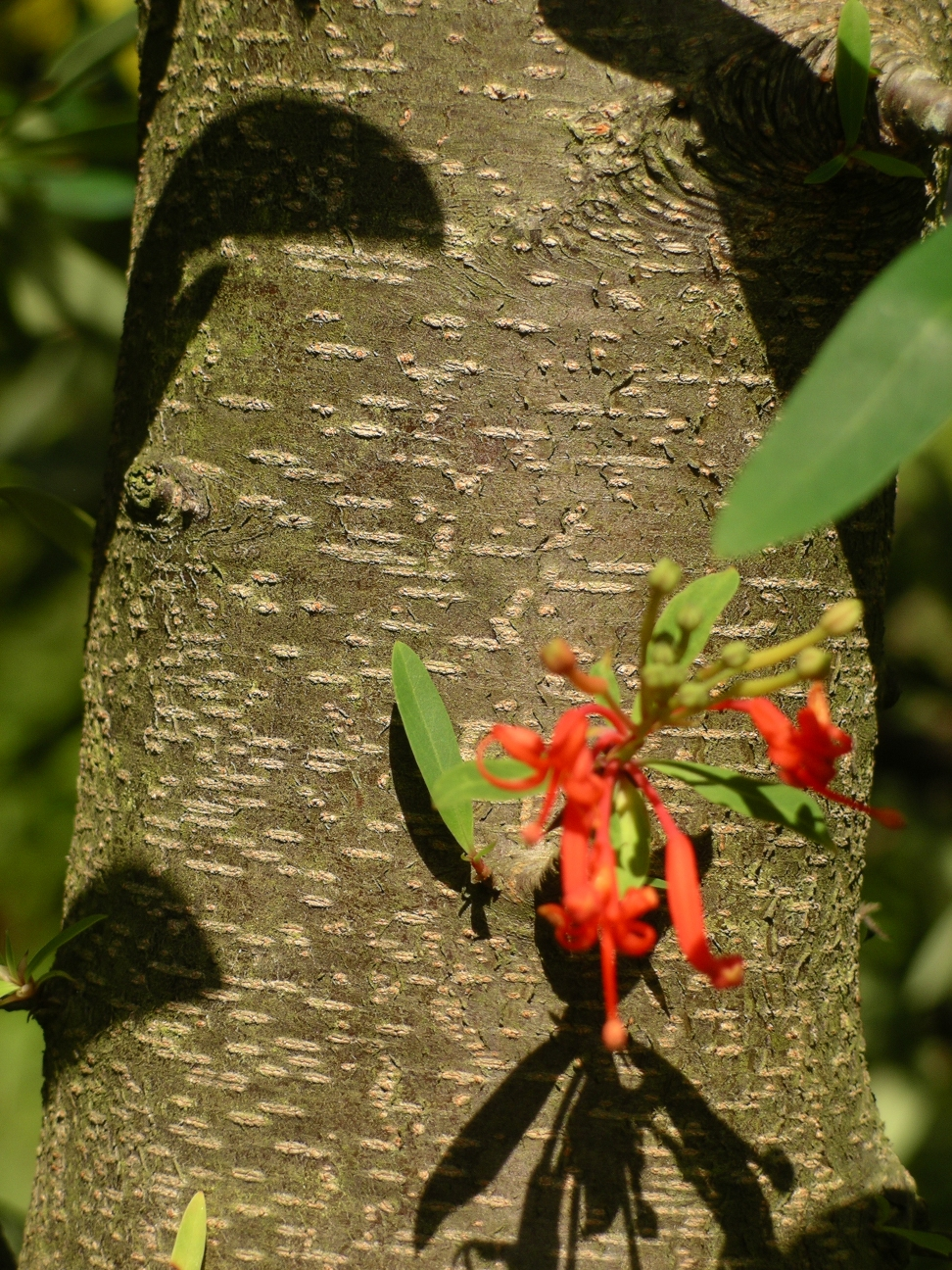
Embothrium Bark

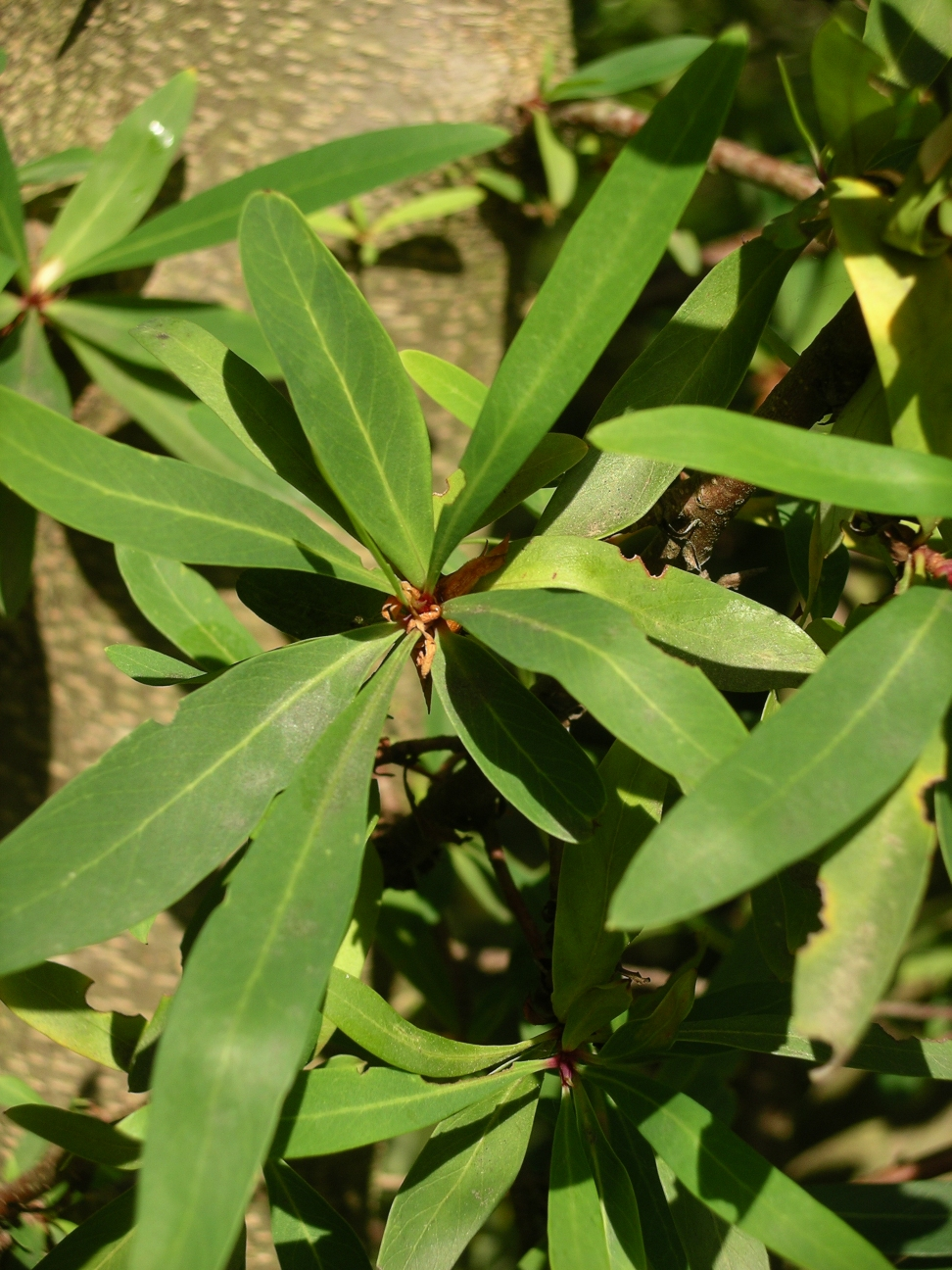
Embothrium leaves

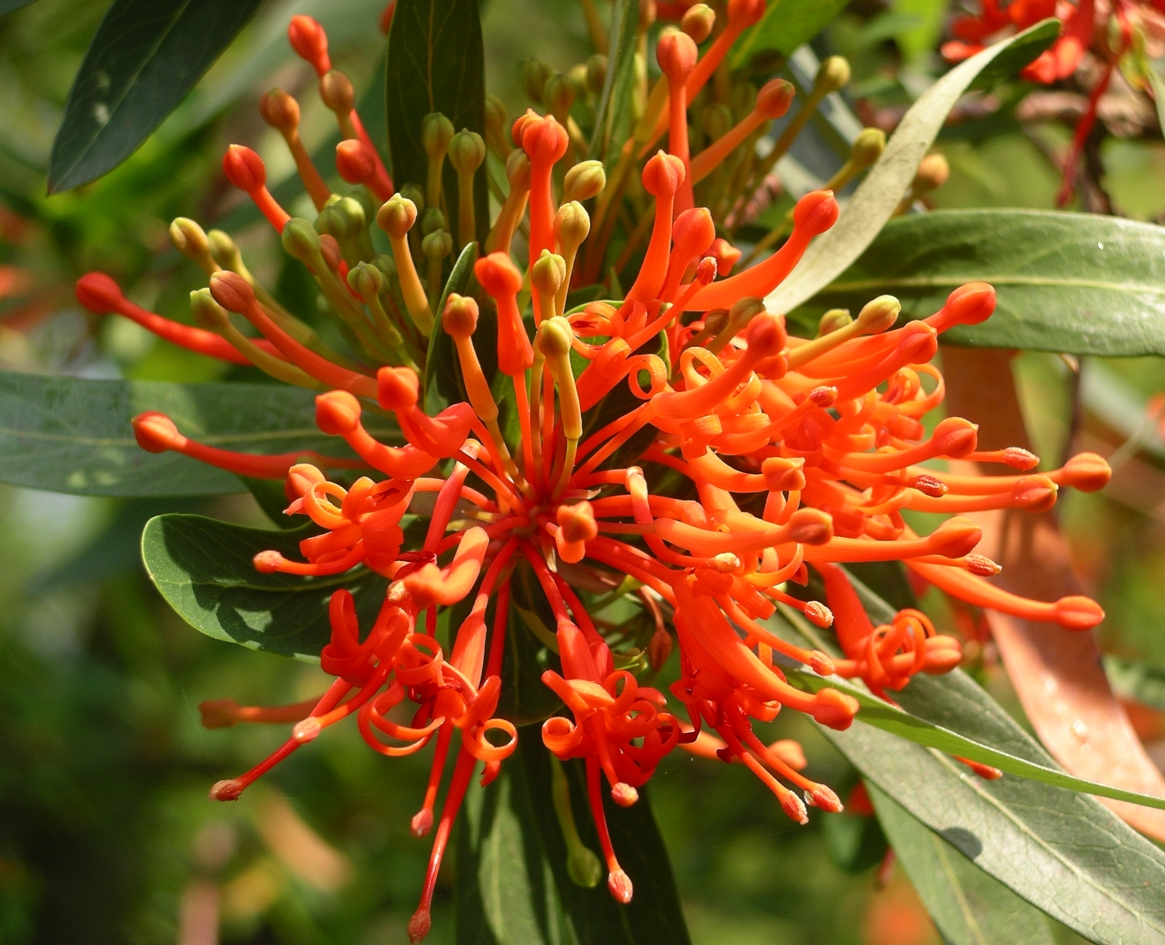
Embothrium flowers
