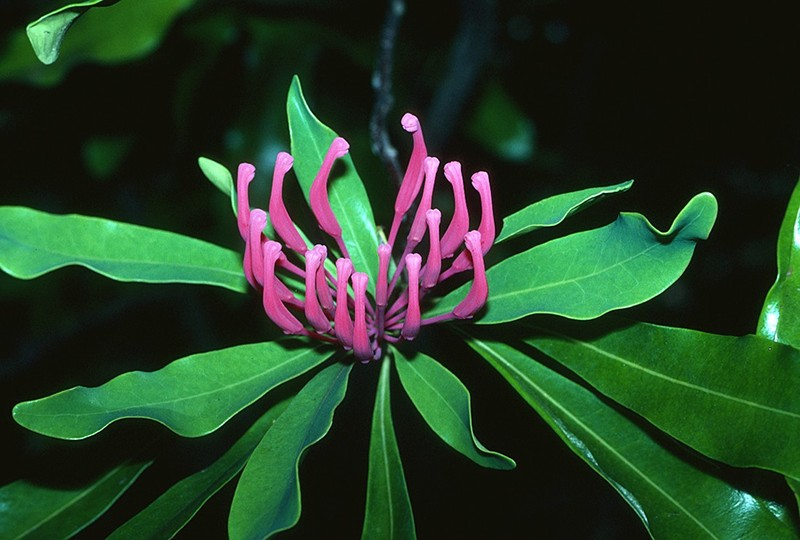

Scientific classification
- Kingdom: Plantae
- Clade: Tracheophytes
- Clade: Angiosperms
- Clade: Eudicots
- Order: Proteales
- Family: Proteaceae
- Genus: Alloxylon
- Species: A. wickhamii

Binomial name
- Alloxylon wickhamii (W.Hill & F.Muell.) P.H.Weston & Crisp

= Alloxylon wickhamii =

Species of tree endemic to Queensland, Australia

Alloxylon wickhamii is a rainforest tree to 30 m (100 ft) tall in the family Proteaceae. It is endemic to the Wet Tropics of Queensland.

In the wet tropics it is found growing in various well-developed rain forests and apparently is "probably more abundant in upland and mountain rain forests".

This substantial rainforest tree species has large leaves (adult: up to 17 cm (6.7 in), younger: up to 40 cm (16 in)) and bunches of attractive pink-red flowers in October and November.

It is "not as well known as Alloxylon flammeum but deserves an equal place in horticulture".
