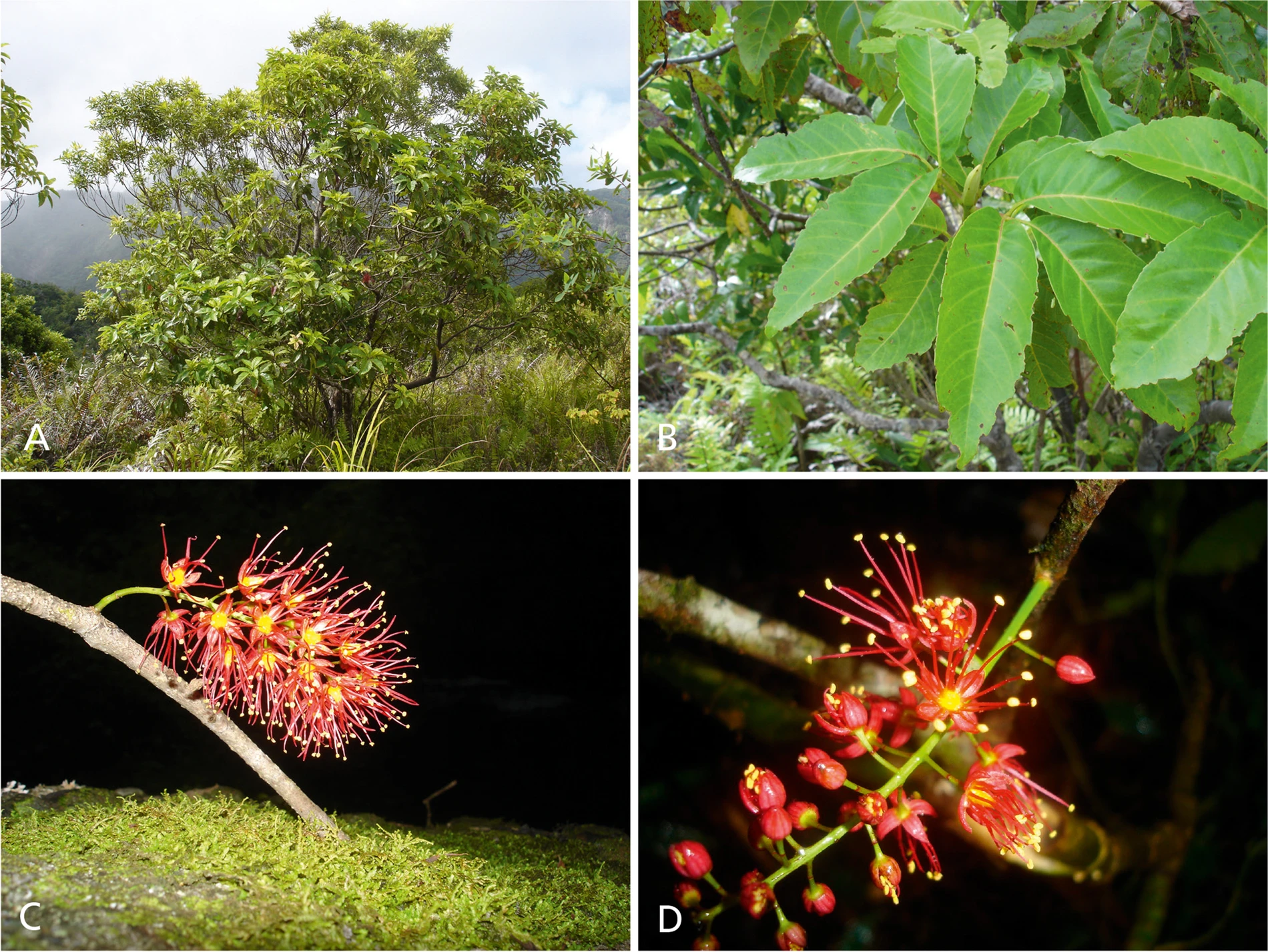
- A: Small tree; B: Opposite trifoliolate leaves and apical bud enclosed by stipules; C: Ramiflorous inflorescence; D: Flowers

Scientific classification
- Kingdom: Plantae
- Clade: Tracheophytes
- Clade: Angiosperms
- Clade: Eudicots
- Clade: Rosids
- Order: Oxalidales
- Family: Cunoniaceae
- Genus: Geissois
- Species: G. denhamii

Binomial name
- Geissois denhamii Seem.

= Geissois denhamii =

Species of tree

Geissois denhamii is a species of forest trees endemic to the island nation of Vanuatu in the Pacific.
