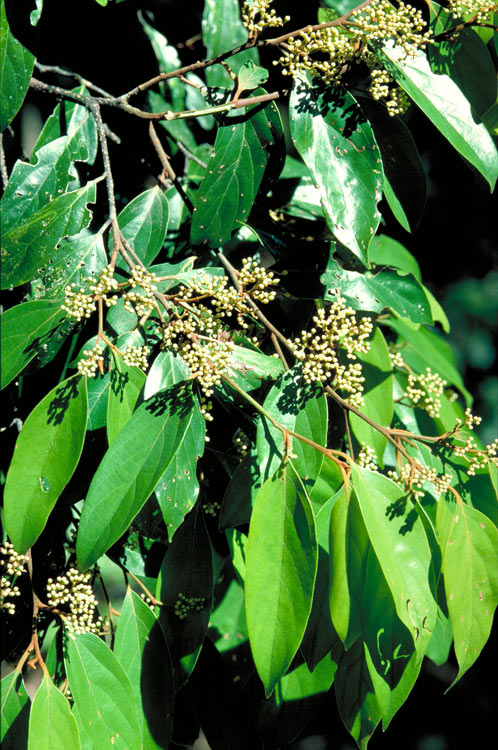
- Leaves and flowers

Conservation status
- Least Concern (IUCN 3.1)

Scientific classification
- Kingdom: Plantae
- Clade: Tracheophytes
- Clade: Angiosperms
- Clade: Magnoliids
- Order: Laurales
- Family: Lauraceae
- Genus: Cryptocarya
- Species: C. onoprienkoana

Binomial name
- Cryptocarya onoprienkoana B.Hyland

= Cryptocarya onoprienkoana =

Species of tree

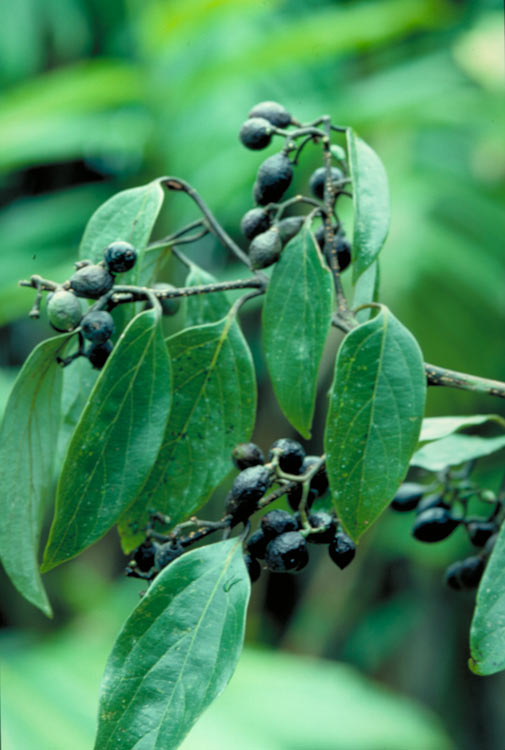
Foliage and fruit

Cryptocarya onoprienkoana, commonly known as rose maple, southern maple, rose walnut or pigeonberry ash is a species of flowering plant in the family Lauraceae and is endemic to Queensland. It is a tree with lance-shaped to elliptic leaves, creamy-green, perfumed flowers, and elliptical black to bluish-black drupes.

== Description ==
Cryptocarya onoprienkoana is a tree that typically grows to a height of up to 35 m (115 ft), its stems buttressed. Its leaves are lance-shaped to elliptic, 80–155 mm (3.1–6.1 in) long and 25–70 mm (1.0–2.8 in) wide, on a petiole 7–19 mm (0.28–0.75 in) long. The flowers creamy green and perfumed, arranged in panicles in leaf axils and are no longer than the leaves. The perianth tube is 0.7–2 mm (0.03–0.08 in) long and 1.3–1.8 mm (0.051–0.071 in) wide. The outer anthers are 0.7–0.9 mm (0.03–0.04 in) long and 0.6–0.8 mm (0.024–0.031 in) wide, the inner anthers 0.7–0.9 mm (0.03–0.04 in) long and 0.5–0.6 mm (0.020–0.024 in) wide. Flowering occurs from September to December, and the fruit is an elliptical, black to bluish-black drupe, 15–22 mm (0.6–0.9 in) long and 11–15 mm (0.43–0.59 in) wide with cream-coloured cotyledons.

== Taxonomy ==
Cryptocarya onoprienkoana was first formally described in 1989 by Bernard Hyland in Australian Systematic Botany from specimens collected in 1983.

== Distribution and habitat ==
Rose maple grows in rainforest, sometimes in drier rainforest, at elevations of 50 to 1,000 m (160 to 3,280 ft) between the Windsor Tablelands in the north and Gympie in central Queensland.

== Conservation status ==
This species of Cryptocarya is listed as "of least concern" under the Queensland Government Nature Conservation Act 1992.
