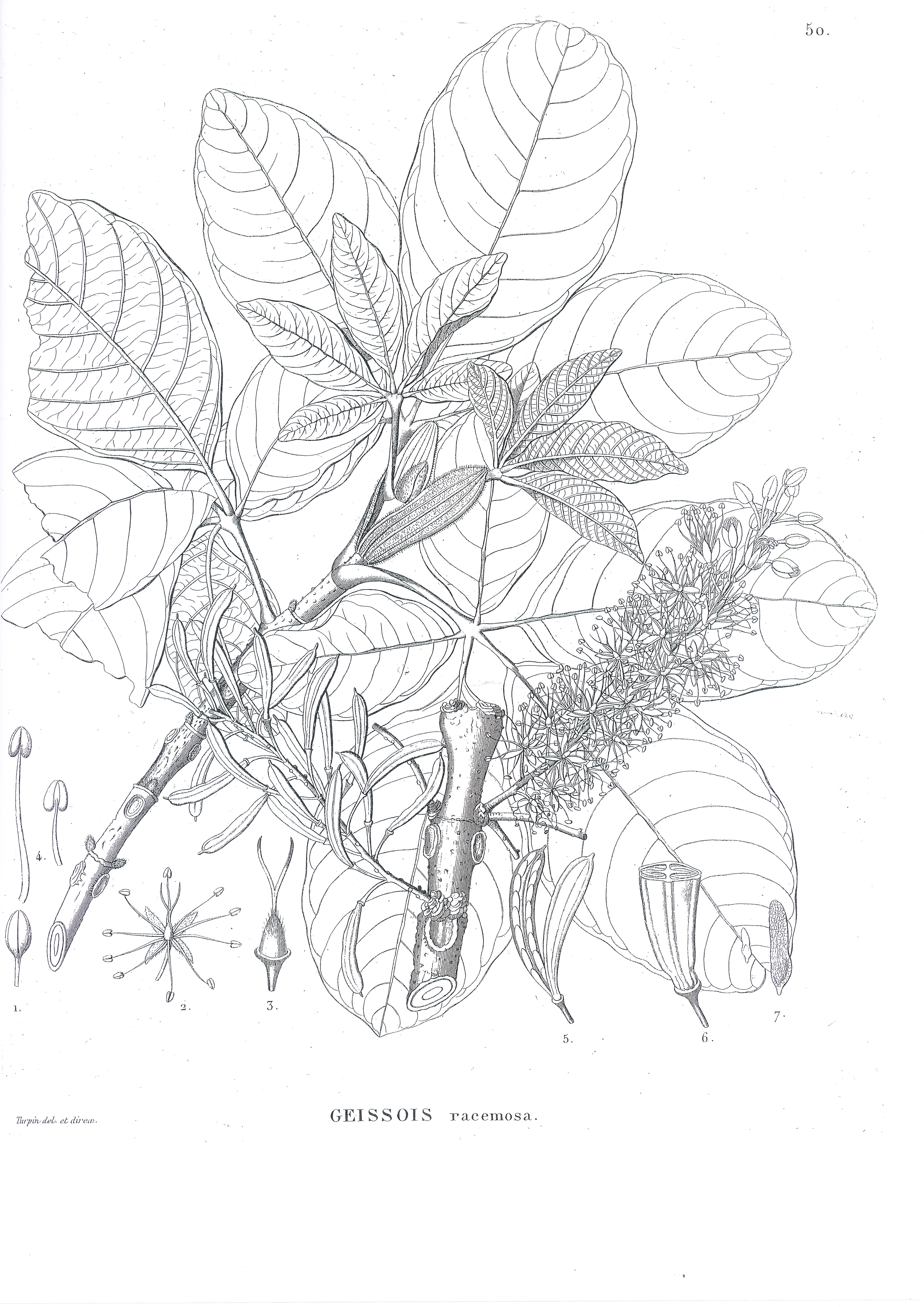
- Geissois racemosa

Scientific classification
- Kingdom: Plantae
- Clade: Embryophytes
- Clade: Tracheophytes
- Clade: Angiosperms
- Clade: Eudicots
- Clade: Rosids
- Order: Oxalidales
- Family: Cunoniaceae
- Genus: Geissois; Labill.

Type species
- Geissois racemosa Labill.

= Geissois =

Genus of flowering plants

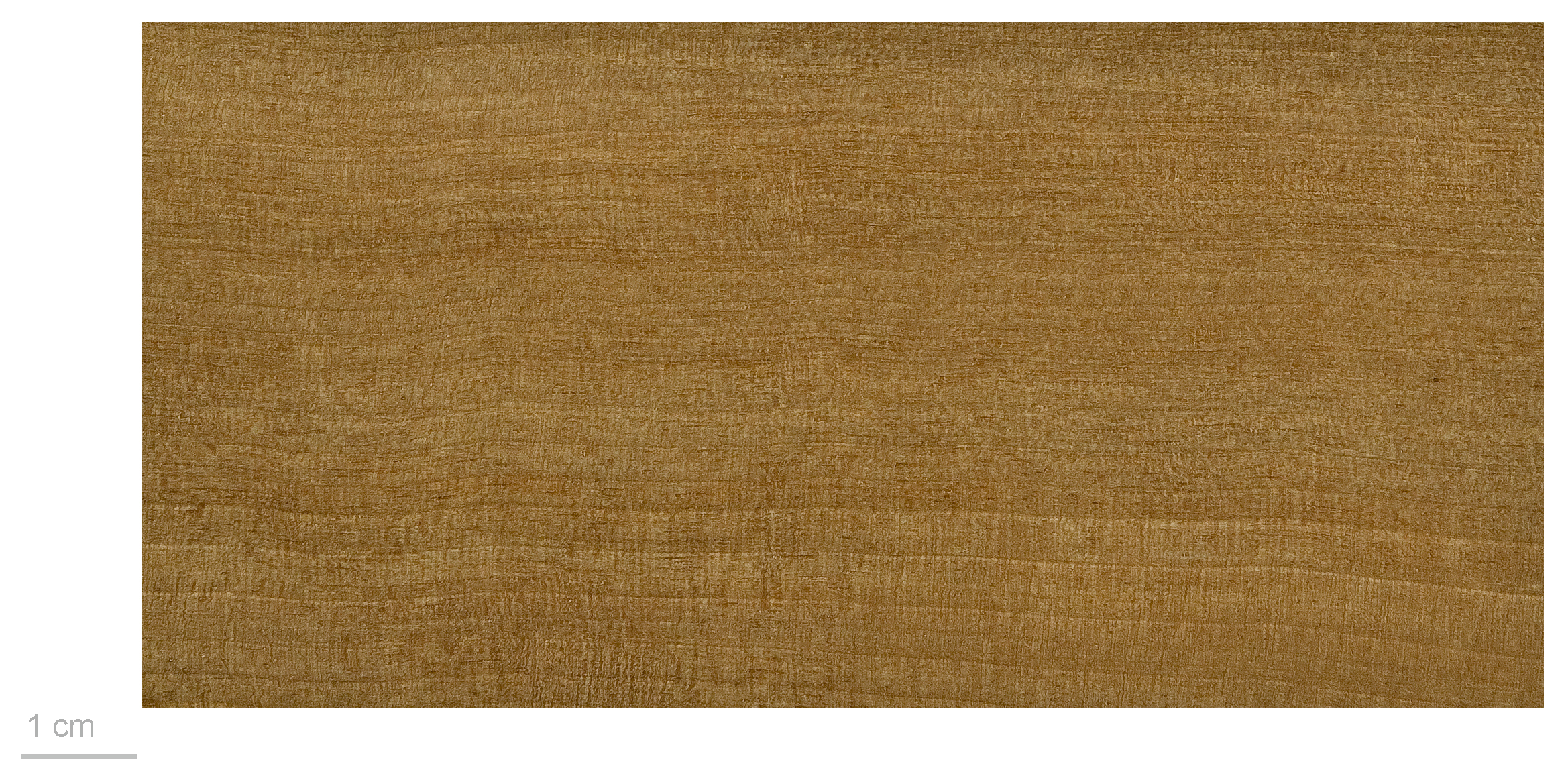
Geissois racemosa wood - MHNT

Geissois is a genus of trees and shrubs in the plant family Cunoniaceae. It includes about 19 species mostly found in New Caledonia, but also in Fiji, Vanuatu, and the Solomon Islands. Leaves are opposite, palmate with 3-9 leaflets, with entire margin (serrate in Geissois hirsuta and juveniles) and intrapetiolar stipules. The inflorescences are simple racemes (trident in Geissois hirsuta) and bottle-brush like. The flowers have four red sepals, lacking petals, with many long red stamens. The fruit is a capsule, the seeds flat and winged. The genus includes several nickel hyperaccumulator (most species occurring on ultramafic rocks) and one aluminum hyperaccumulator, Geissois polyphylla.

Two species from Australia formerly placed in this genus have now been transferred to the genus Karrabina.

== Species ==
New Caledonia

- Geissois balansae Brongn. & Gris ex Guillaumin
- Geissois belema Pillon & H.C.Hopkins
- Geissois bradfordii H.C.Hopkins
- Geissois hippocastanifolia Guillaumin
- Geissois hirsuta Brongn. & Gris
- Geissois lanceolata (Guillaumin) H.C.Hopkins
- Geissois magnifica Baker f.
- Geissois montana Vieill. ex Brongn. & Gris
- Geissois polyphylla Lécard ex Guillaumin
- Geissois pruinosa Brongn. & Gris
  - var. intermedia (Vieill. ex Pamp.) H.C.Hopkins & Pillon
  - var. pruinosa
- Geissois racemosa Labill.
- Geissois trifoliolata Guillaumin
- Geissois velutina Guillaumin ex H.C.Hopkins

Fiji

- Geissois imthurnii Turrill
- Geissois stipularis A.C.Sm.
- Geissois superba Gillespie
- Geissois ternata A.Gray

Vanuatu

- Geissois denhamii Seem.

Solomon Islands (Temotu Province)

- Geissois pentaphylla C.T.White
