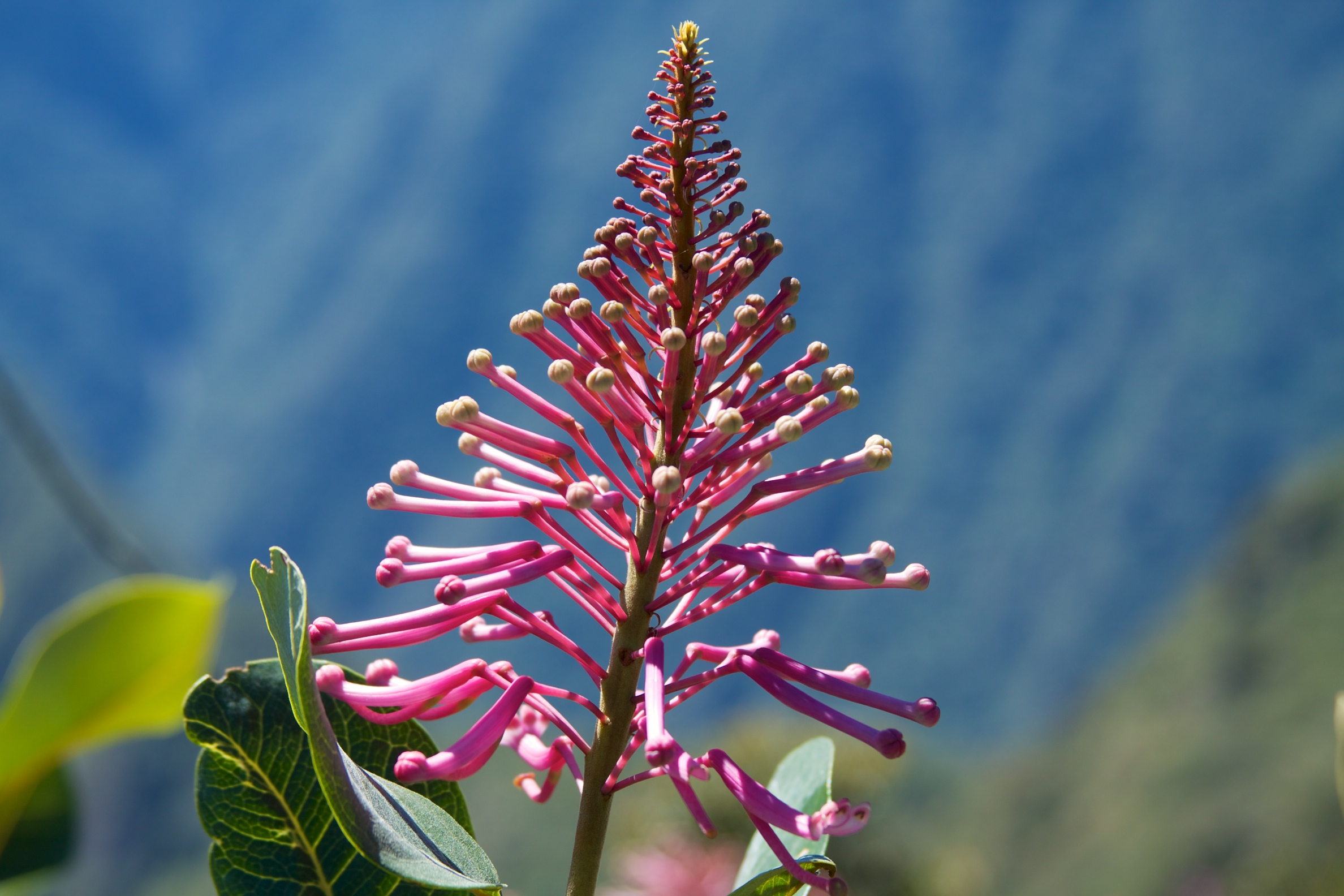
- Flowers of Oreocallis grandiflora

Scientific classification
- Kingdom: Plantae
- Clade: Tracheophytes
- Clade: Angiosperms
- Clade: Eudicots
- Order: Proteales
- Family: Proteaceae
- Subfamily: Grevilleoideae
- Tribe: Embothrieae
- Subtribe: Embothriinae
- Genus: Oreocallis; R.Br.
- Species: O. grandiflora

Binomial name
- Oreocallis grandiflora (Lam.) R.Br.

= Oreocallis =

Monotypic genus of plants in the family Proteaceae from Peru and Ecuador

Oreocallis is a South American plant genus in the family Proteaceae. There is only one species, Oreocallis grandiflora, which is native to mountainous regions in Peru and Ecuador.

Previously, the genus was considered to have several species on both sides of the Pacific Ocean, however the four Australasian species were reclassified in the genus Alloxylon.

The genus was originally defined by Robert Brown in 1810 to contain the Australian species now classified elsewhere, while the two recognised South American species were placed in Embothrium at the time. A reclassification by Dutch botanist Hermann Otto Sleumer in 1954 saw these species transferred into Oreocallis. A second species O. mucronata, has been reclassified as conspecific with O. grandiflora. Some recent sources recognize both species.

== Description ==
The species is a tree or shrub which reaches heights of about 6 metres (20 ft). The leaves, which are arranged in a spiral pattern along the twigs, have a simple, entire blade. As is the case with many species in the Proteaceae, the leaves are highly variable. The shape of the leaves varies from narrow and elongate (lanceolate, or lance shaped) to broad and ellipse-shaped, or anything in between. The base of the leaf can be narrow or broad, and the leaf tip can be pointed or rounded. They usually range from 4.8 to 12.7 centimetres (1.9 to 5.0 in) in length, occasionally reaching lengths of 21.5 cm (8.5 in), and are 1.6 to 3.4 cm (0.63 to 1.34 in) wide. Young leaves are often covered with dense, reddish hairs while older leaves tend to have smooth surfaces with hairs concentrated along the main veins on the lower surface of the leaf. Plants have a terminal or lateral conflorescence (a type of inflorescence). The inflorescences, which are usually 7 to 17.5 cm (2.8 to 6.9 in) long; but occasionally as much as 38 cm (15 in), bear flowers that can be white, pink, yellow or red in colour. The tepals (petals and sepals) are mostly fused along their length, with only the tips of the tepals unfused. The pollen grains have three pores, a condition that is thought to be primitive in the Proteaceae.

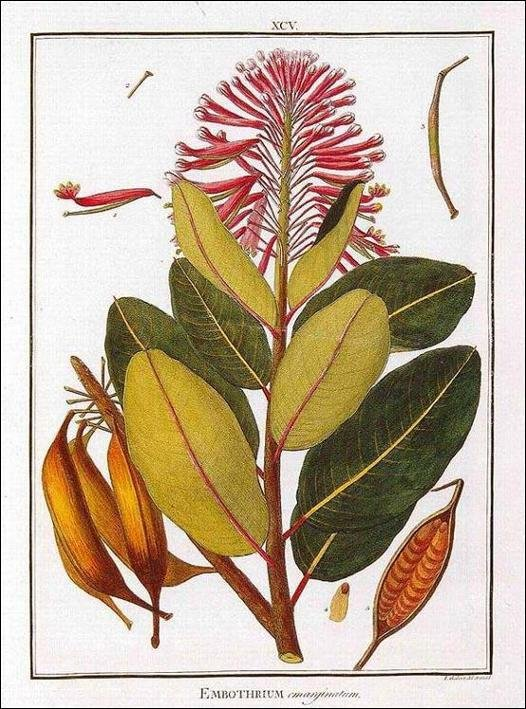
Botanical drawing of Oreocallis grandiflora.

== Taxonomy ==
The genus' name is derived from the Ancient Greek words or(e)os "mountain", and kalli- "beauty".

Together with Telopea, Alloxylon and Embothrium, Oreocallis makes up a small group of terminal often red-flowering showy plants scattered around the southern edges of the Pacific Rim. Known as the Embothriinae, this is an ancient group with roots in the mid Cretaceous, when Australia, Antarctica and South America were linked by land. Almost all these species have red terminal flowers, and hence the subtribe's origin and floral appearance must predate the splitting of Gondwana into Australia, Antarctica, and South America over 60 million years ago. The prominent position and striking colour of many species within the subtribe both in Australia and South America strongly suggest they are adapted to pollination by birds, and have been for over 60 million years. Triporopollenites ambiguus is an ancient member of the proteaceae known only from pollen deposits, originally described from Eocene deposits in Victoria. The fossil pollen closely resembles that of T. truncata, Alloxylon pinnatum as well as O. grandiflora.

The type species, Oreocallis grandiflora, is a plant with terminal showy red, pink, yellow or whitish inflorescences found in mountainous areas in Peru and southern Ecuador. It was originally described by French naturalist Jean-Baptiste Lamarck in 1786 as Embothrium grandiflora. Robert Brown used it as the type species for the genus Oreocallis when he circumscribed the genus is 1810. As envisioned by Brown, the genus included both South American and Australian species, but in 1991 Peter Weston and Michael Crisp split the Australian species out of Oreocallis and placed them in a new genus, Alloxylon.

In 1954, the Dutch botanist Hermann Sleumer split O. grandiflora into two species, placing individuals with smooth leaves and twigs and pale, white or pink flowers into a new species, O. mucronata, while leaving those with hairy leaves and twigs and darker red flowers in O. grandiflora. Pennington (2007) rejected Sleumer's split, arguing that the hairiness of the leaves and twigs often varied within individuals, and did not vary consistently with flower colour. Weston and Crisp also suggested that differences in flower colour and the angle at which the mature flowers are held may justify this split. While Pennington acknowledged that differences in these characters exist, he argued that the variation was continuous and not the sort of binary variation that would justify a split into two species. He did acknowledge, however, that this difference may be more apparent in live plants and suggested that further study is needed.

In 2016, a study comparing the pollination ecology of Oreocallis grandiflora at northern and southern ends of its distribution, found evidence of divergence in style length and flower openness, nectar standing crop and secretion rate, and pollinator community among Ecuadorian and Peruvian populations. Divergences in floral traits may be related to a combination of factors, including genetic drift and isolation by distance, distinctive suites of pollinators, or heterospecific pollen competition.

== Habitat and ecology ==
Oreocallis grandiflora is a characteristic species in certain semi-deciduous forests in valleys and evergreen upper montane forest in the Andean forests of southern Ecuador and evergreen sclerophyllous forests in northern Peru. It grows at elevations between 1,200 and 3,800 m (3,900 and 12,500 ft) above sea level. It tolerates habitat disturbance, and may be expanding its range in response to increased human activity. Apparently, floration is constant throughout the year.

Pollinator communities vary with distribution and floral visitation occurs during day and night, albeit nocturnal visitation is reported in southern Ecuador only. During the day, inflorescences are visited by birds, at least 14 hummingbird species including Metallura tyrianthina, Aglaeactis cupripennis and Coeligena iris. Mammals are the only nocturnal visitors, Phyllostomid bat Anoura geoffroyi, and Andean mouse Microryzomys altissimus; the role of M. altissimus as actual pollinator is yet to be confirmed, although samples taken from its fur indicate pollen removal.

== Uses ==
The plant is used for firewood, furniture/carpentry; its "pleasantly mottled cream-white, pinkish and pale brown wood" was used for inlay work and borders on chess boards. It also has medicinal uses. The seeds are eaten in southern Ecuador.
