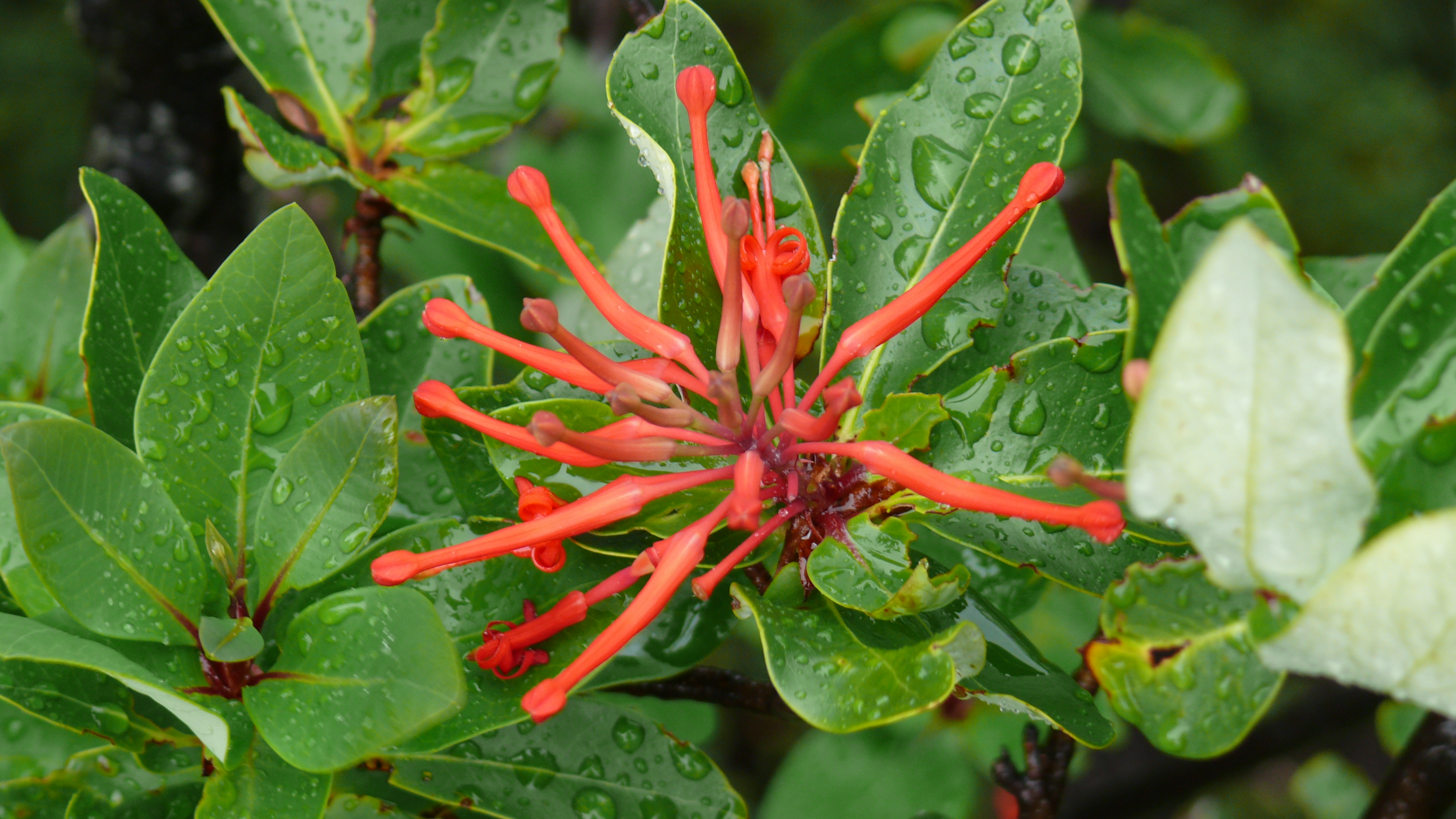
- Flowers in Torres del Paine National Park

Scientific classification
- Kingdom: Plantae
- Clade: Embryophytes
- Clade: Tracheophytes
- Clade: Spermatophytes
- Clade: Angiosperms
- Clade: Eudicots
- Order: Proteales
- Family: Proteaceae
- Genus: Embothrium
- Species: E. coccineum

Binomial name
- Embothrium coccineum J.R.Forst. & G.Forst.

= Embothrium coccineum =

Species of tree from Chile and Argentina

Embothrium coccineum, Chilean firetree or Chilean firebush, commonly known in Chile and Argentina as notro, ciruelillo and fósforo is a small evergreen tree in the flowering plant family Proteaceae. It grows in the temperate forests of Chile and Argentina.

== Description ==
The Chilean firetree grows 4–15 m (13–50 ft) tall and can reach 50 cm (20 in) in diameter. The bark is dark grey with light spots and the wood is light pink in colour. It produces clusters of deep red flowers (occasionally pale yellow) and flowering occurs in spring. The fruit is a dry follicle, with about 10 seeds inside.

== Ecology ==
It is pollinated by both hummingbirds and insects in its natural range.

=== Cluster roots ===
Like other members of the family Proteaceae, E. coccineum seedlings produce dense root masses called cluster roots or proteoid roots that provide access to normally inaccessible forms of various nutrients, especially phosphorus. Cluster roots exude acidic substances which are able to convert the otherwise inaccessible forms of nutrients into forms that are biologically useful. These nutrients are then made available to other plants from the leaf litter of E. coccineum, making it a valuable keystone plant in certain terrains.

== Uses ==
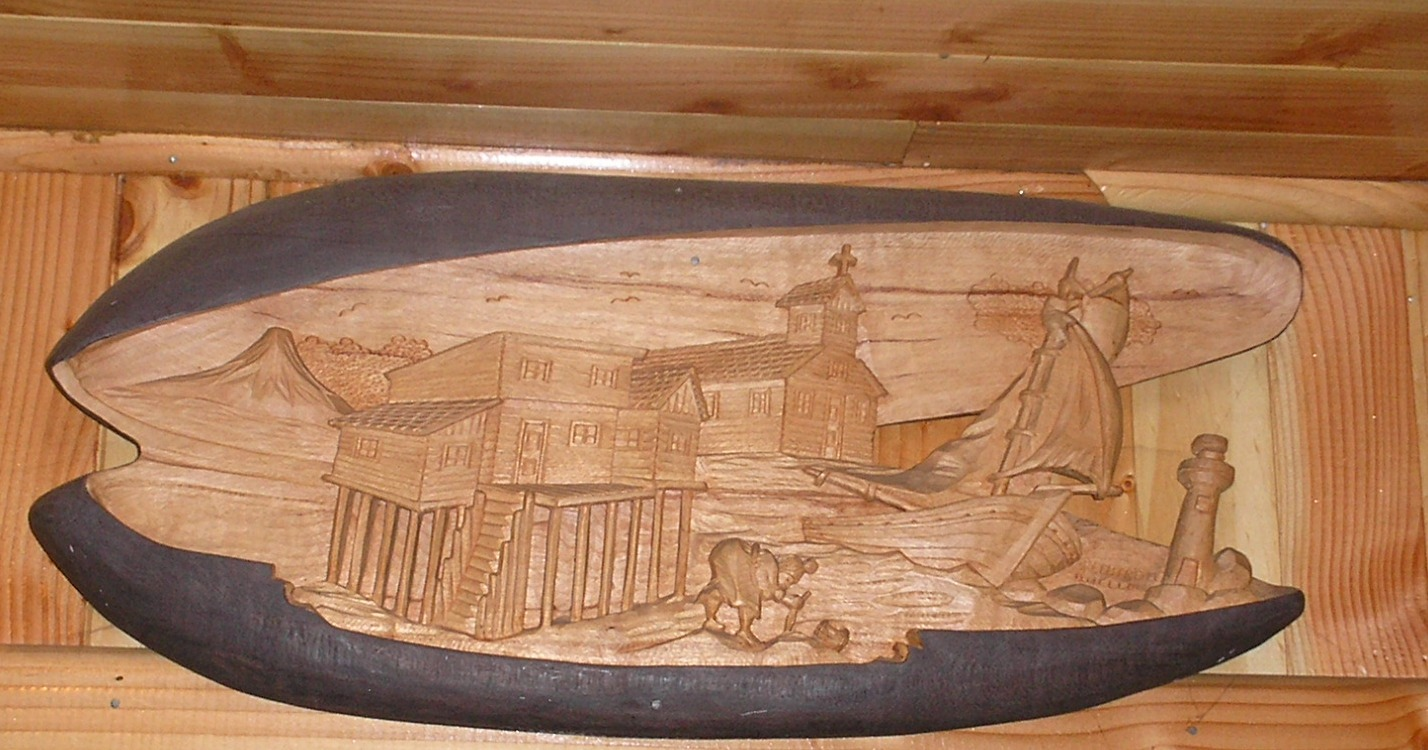
Scene carved on a piece of "Notro" wood

It is grown as an ornamental in Great Britain and the United States, and as far north as the Faroe Islands at 62° North latitude. The plant was introduced to Europe by William Lobb during his plant collecting expedition to the Valdivian temperate forests in 1845–1848. It was described by Kew Gardens as:

Perhaps no tree cultivated in the open air in the British Isles gives so striking and brilliant a display as this does.

The wood being very soft but durable, is used for making spoons, kitchen vessels and other craft articles.

== Gallery ==
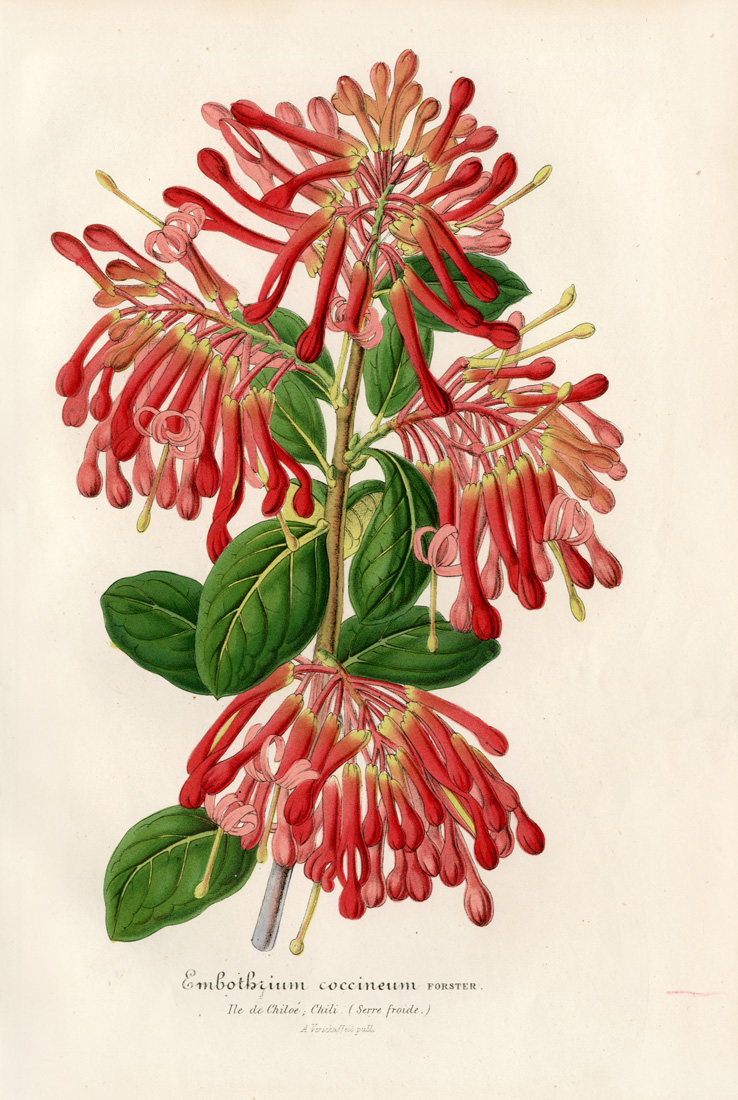
19th-century illustration

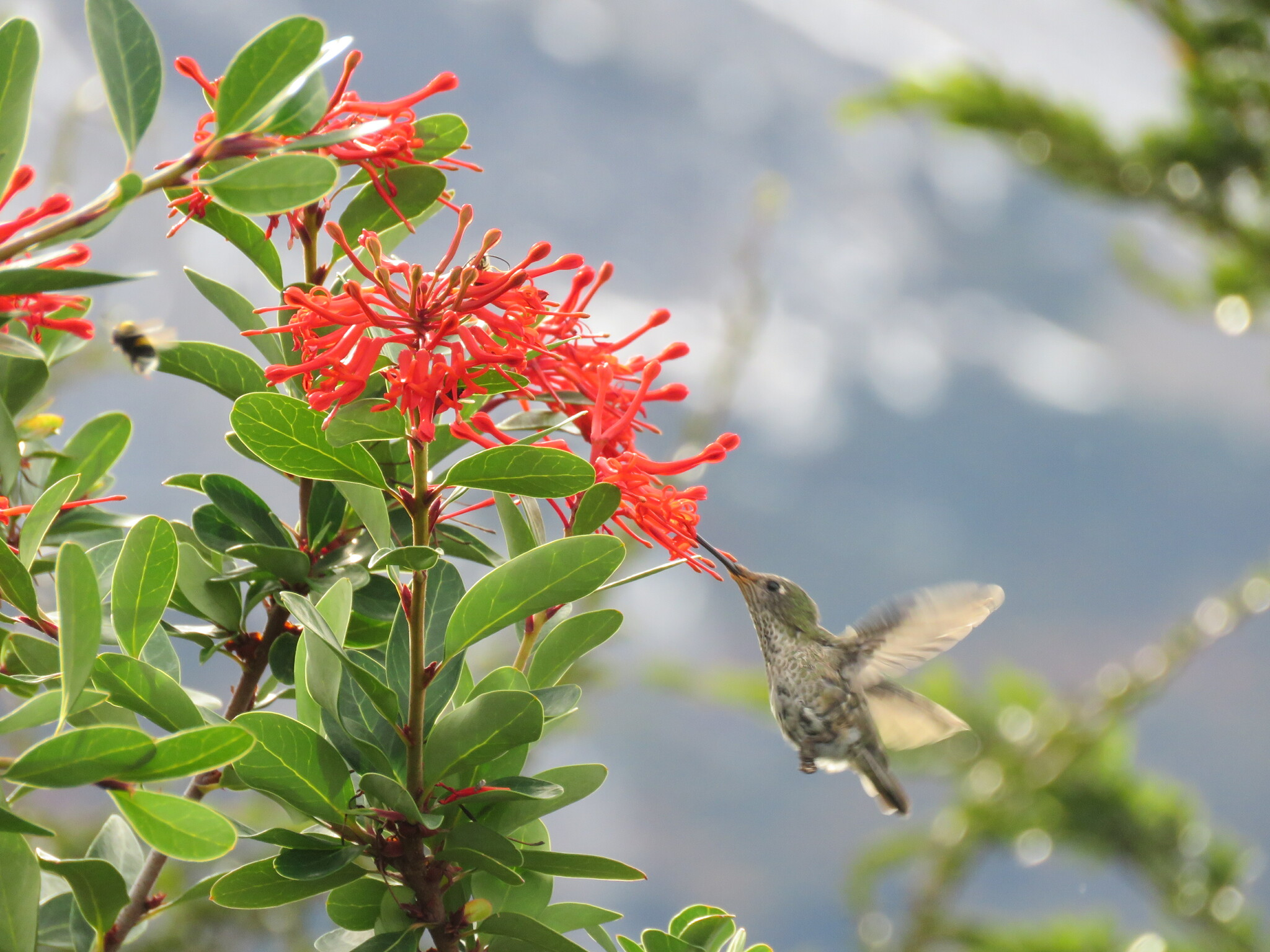
Green-backed firecrown feeding from Chilean firebush flowers, in Tierra del Fuego
