= Flora of the Australian Capital Territory =

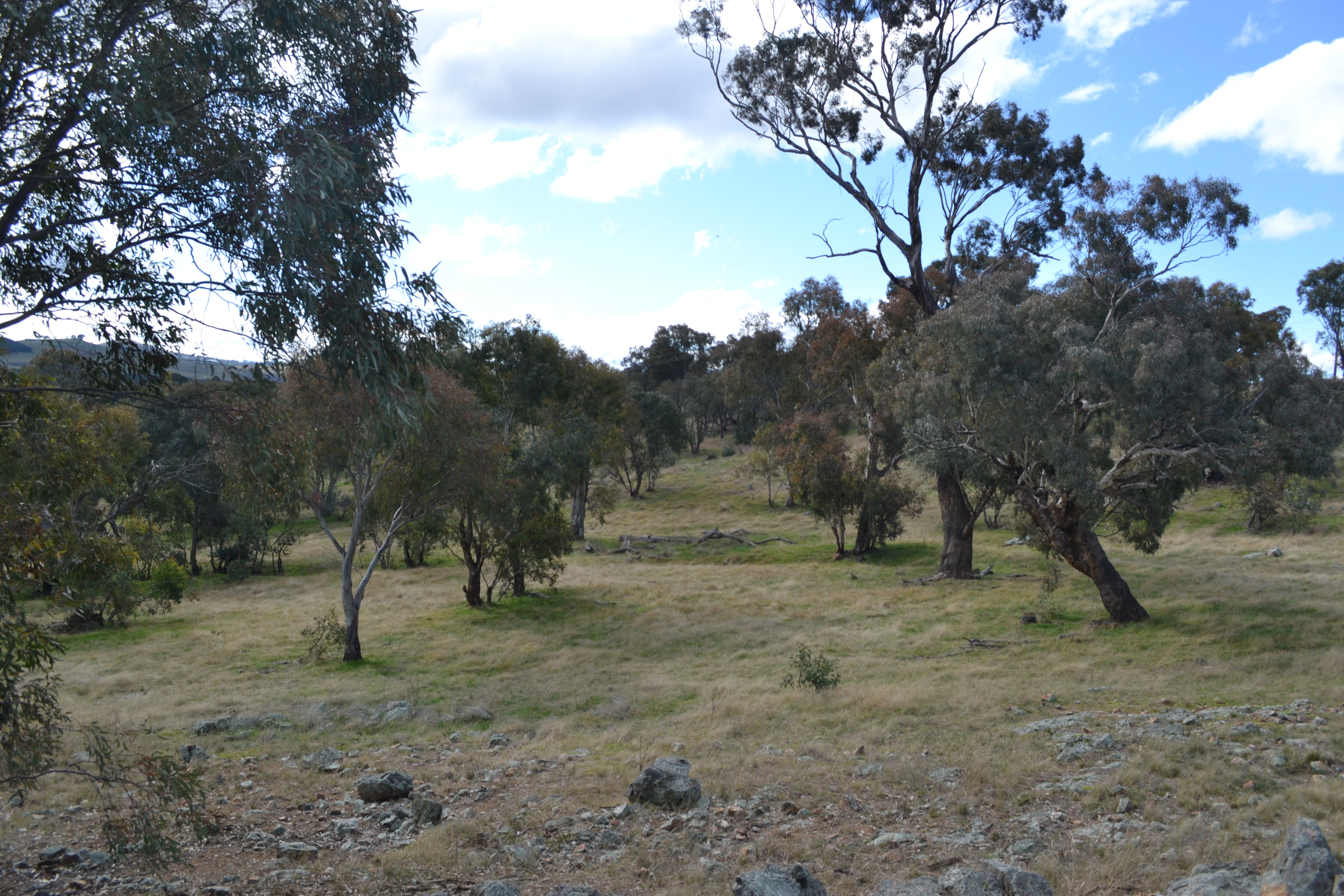
Flora of Curtin Park found in Curtin, ACT

The Flora of the Australian Capital Territory are the plants that grow naturally in the Australian Capital Territory (ACT). The environments range from Alpine area on the higher mountains, sclerophyll forest, to woodland. Much of the ACT has been cleared for grazing, and is also burnt off by bushfires several times per century. The kinds of plants can be grouped into vascular plants that include gymnosperms, flowering plants, and ferns; bryophytes, lichens, fungi, and freshwater algae. Four flowering plants are endemic to the ACT. Also several lichens are unique to the ACT, however as further study is undertaken they are likely to be found elsewhere too.

Most plants in the ACT are characteristic of the Flora of Australia and include well known plants such as Grevillea, Eucalyptus trees and kangaroo grass.

== Vegetation habitats ==
Grassland originally occurred on the low plains around north Canberra, Woolshed creek in Majura, Jerrabomberra Creek in Symonston, Gerrabomberra Creek in Belconnen, Tuggeranong Creek in Isabella Plains and Yarralumla Creek in Woden Valley. Almost all of these areas have been built over by suburbs, or modified by farming. The main plants from the grasslands were Stipa, Danthonia and Themeda (spear grass, wallaby grass and kangaroo grass). Trees do not exists on the grasslands due to the frost hollow effect where cold heavy air sinks on frosty mornings killing off larger vegetation. The remains of the grasslands are now full of introduced weeds and grasses. A small reserve of remnant grasslands is found at Yarramundi on the north side of Lake Burley Griffin.

Most of the trees in the ACT are Eucalyptus species.

Low altitude woodland is dominated by Eucalyptus melliodora (yellow box) and Eucalyptus polyanthemos (red box). E. blakelyi is found in lower lying areas. E. bridgesiana grows along creeks. In sandy soil near rivers Casuarina cunninghamiana is common. On the border between woodland and grassland Eucalyptus pauciflora (snow gum) and Eucalyptus rubida are the only trees growing. These trees can survive lower temperatures.

High altitude woodland occupies the floor of the higher valleys in the south of the ACT. The trees are dominated by E. stellulata (black sally) and snowgums.

On the ground above the woodland there is dry sclerophyll forest. The trees in this are Eucalyptus dives (broad leaved peppermint), E. mannifera var maculosa (red spotted gum), the scribbly gum (Eucalyptus rossii) and red stringy gum (Eucalyptus macrorhyncha). Mount Majura, Mount Ainslie, Bullen Range, and Black Mountain are covered in this kind of forest. Dry sclerophyll forest also grows on the north and west side of hills, below 660 metres, which is warmer and drier. Gulleys in this kind of forest can contain Eucalyptus viminalis (manna gum) and Eucalyptus radiata var. robertsonii (narrow leaved peppermint).

Wet sclerophyll forest is found growing on the western mountainous parts of the ACT where rain fall is higher and the ground is more elevated. E. fastigata (brown barrel) and Eucalyptus delegatensis (alpine ash) dominate the forest. Dense shrubs up to five metres high form an understorey. Examples of these are Leptospermum lanigerum, Pomaderris aspera, Olearia argophylla, and Bedfordia salicina. The top side of this forest has Eucalyptus dalrympleana and E. pauciflora starting to take over.

Alpine woodland is found in the highest levels of the ACT with E. pauciflora the dominant tree. This grows either thinly or in clumps, with the intervening ground feature Poa species.

== Vascular plants found only in the ACT ==
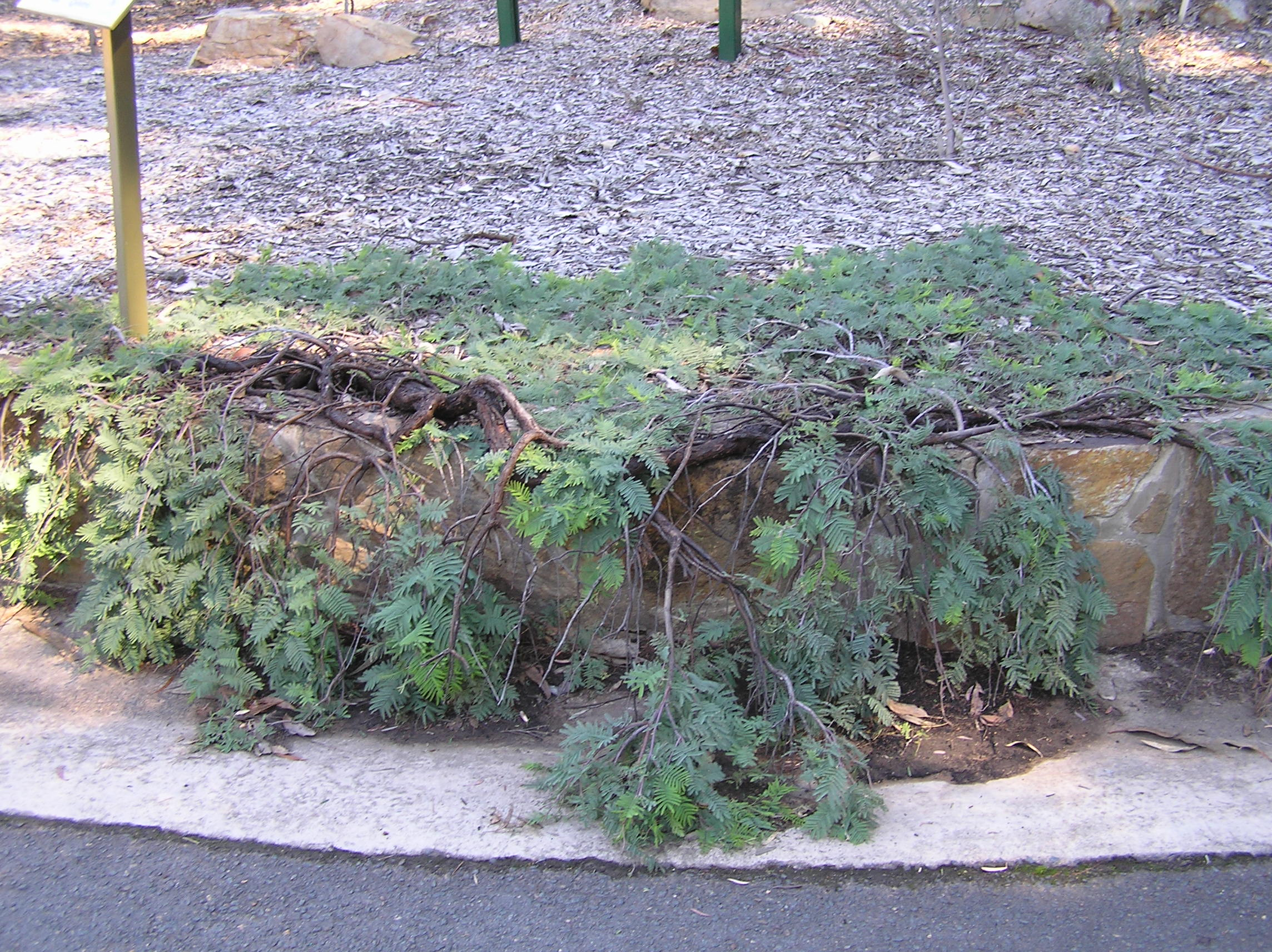
Kambah Karpet a variety of Acacia dealbata discovered at the Kambah Village

- Pomaderris pallida family Rhamnaceae. Found along Murrumbidgee, Cotter, Paddys and Molonglo Rivers. A round bush 1 to 2 metres high, creamish coloured flowers.
- Arachnorchis actensis (Canberra spider-orchid).
- Lepidium ginninderrense (Ginninderra peppercress). Found in the Northwest corner of the Belconnen Naval Transmission Station at Lawson
- Muehlenbeckia tuggeranong (Tuggeranong lignum). The plant takes the form of a mound of tangled stems 1 m high and 2 m across. Found near Pine Island on the Murrumbidgee River but is extremely rare.
- Corunastylis ectopa (Brindabella midge-orchid, ectopic midge-orchid).

== Gymnosperms ==
Only two species of gymnosperms are native to the ACT. These are a shrub called Podocarpus lawrencei (mountain plum pine) and a small tree Callitris endlicheri (black cypress pine). The cypress grows in steep stony soil in places such as Molonglo Gorge, Murrumbidgee River valley and Ginninderra Gorge.

Other gymnosperms are cultivated in the ACT such as Pinus radiata.

== Government managed trees in the ACT ==
In the ACT, the government manages over 760,000 trees on public urban land as well as trees on leased land.

There are 210 tree species that have been approved by the ACT government for landscape projects. The trees include native trees, exotic trees and conifers:

- Acacia caerulescens
- Acacia covenyi
- Acacia melanoxylon
- Acacia pendula
- Acer andrachne
- Acer buergerianum
- Acer griseum
- Acer grosseri var. hersii
- Acer plantanoides Crimson King
- Acer platanoides
- Acer japonicum Vitifolium
- Acer japonicum
- Acer palmatum Trompenburg
- Acer plantanoides Crimson Sentry
- Acer rubrum October Glory
- Acer × freemanii Jeffersred Autumn Blaze
- Allocasuarina glauca
- Allocasuarina littoralis
- Allocasuarina verticillata
- Angophora floribunda
- Arbutus manziesii
- Arbutus unedo
- Arbutus × andrachnoides
- Betula pendula Laciniata
- Betula pendula
- Brachychiton populneus
- Callistemon citrinus
- Callitris endlicheri
- Callitris glaucophylla
- Callistemon harkness
- Callistemon kings park
- Callistemon viminalis
- Callistemon muelleri
- Catalpa bignonioides
- Cedrus atlantica Glauca
- Cedrus deodara
- Cedrus libani
- Crataegus Smithiana
- Cupressus arizonica
- Cupressus cashmeriana
- Cupressus sempervirenus Glauca
- Cupressus sempervirens Glauca
- Cupressus sempervirens Stricta
- Cupressus sempervirens Swanes Golden
- Cupressus torulosa
- Davidia involucrata
- Eucalyptus aggregata
- Eucalyptus apiculata
- Eucalyptus cinerea
- Eucalyptus cunninghamii
- Eucalyptus dealbata
- Eucalyptus dives
- Eucalyptus gracilis
- Eucalyptus leucoxylon
- Eucalyptus lacrimans
- Eucalyptus mannifera
- Eucalyptus michaelinana
- Eucalyptus mitchelliana
- Eucalyptus moorei
- Eucalyptus nortonii
- Eucalyptus parvula
- Eucalyptus pauciflora
- Eucalyptus scoparia
- Eucalyptus stellulata
- Fagus sylvatica Purpurea
- Fraxinus americana
- Fraxinus angustifolia subsp. oxycarpa Raywood
- Fraxinus excelsior Aurea
- Fraxinus excelsior Westhofs Glorie
- Fraxinus ornus
- Fraxinus pennsylvanica Cimmzam Cimmarson
- Fraxinus pennsylvanica Urbdell Urbanite
- Fraxinus pennsylvanica Wasky Skyward
- Fraxinus velutina
- Ginkgo biloba
- Gleditsia triacanthos
- Larix decidua
- Liquidambar styraciflua festeri
- Liquidambar styraciflua
- Melaleuca bracteata
- Melia azedarach caroline
- Melia azedarach elite
- Pinus brutia
- Pinus canariensis
- Pinus eldarica
- Pinus halepensis
- Pinus patula
- Pinus pinea
- Pinus sabiniana
- Pinus torreyana
- Platanus orientalis var. digitata
- Platanus orientalis × chilensis
- Platanus orientalis
- Populus deltoides
- Populus yunnanensis
- Quercus acutissima
- Quercus douglasii
- Quercus engelmannii
- Quercus liex
- Quercus palustris Pringreen Green Pillar
- Quercus phellos
- Quercus robur Fastigiata
- Quercus rubra
- Quercus suber
- Quillaja saponaria
- Taxodium distichum
- Zelkova serrata
- Zelkova serrata Green Vase
- Zelkova serrata Musashino

== Lichens ==
=== Endemic lichens of the ACT ===
Australian Capital Territory has 384 known species of lichens of which 8 are endemic. Study continues on these life forms, so more will be discovered.

The following are found in the ACT, but not in other parts of Australia, those in bold are endemic to the ACT. Those not in bold are found in other parts of the world, but not elsewhere in Australia.

- **Buellia molonglo** (U.Grube & Elix)
- **Lecanora placodiolica** (Lumbsch & Elix)
- **Malcolmiella cinereovirens** Vezda var. isidiata (Vezda),
- **Pyrrhospora arandensis** (Elix)
- **Xanthoparmelia hyposalazinica** (Elix)
- **Xanthoparmelia paraparmeliformis** (Elix)
- **Xanthoparmelia parasitica** (Elix)
- **Xanthoparmelia subluminosa** (Hale)
- Collema fragrans
- Fellhanera parvula
- Fuscopannaria granulans
- Lepraria caesioalba (de Lesd.)
- Micarea denigrata (Fr.)
- Peltigera dilacerata (Gyeln.)

=== Common lichens in the ACT ===
(Note: The lichens here are not endemic to the ACT.)

- Chrysothrix candellaris - yellow crustose lichen on wood
- Ramboldia petraeoides crustose form on stone
- Flavoparmelia rutidota is a green foliose lichen found on wood and rocks.
- Thamnolia vermicularis is found in high parts of Namadgi National Park - and polar regions (not in ACT).
- Rhizocarpon geographicum (map lichen)

=== List of ACT Lichens ===
- Acarospora citrina
- Amygdalaria pelobotryon
- Austrella arachnoidea
- Bacidina apiahica
- Baeomyces heteromorphus
- Bapalmuia buchananii
- B. georgei
- B. molonglo
- B. pruinosa
- B. substellulans
- C. adspersum
- C. aggregata
- Candelaria concolor
- Carbonea montevidensis
- C. aurella
- C. bimberiensis
- C. capitellata
- C. capitellata
- C. capitellata
- C. celata
- C. cervicornis
- C. chlorophaea
- C. cinnabarina
- C. corallaizon
- C. corniculata
- C. corrugativa
- C. durietzii
- C. enantia
- C. erythrosticta
- Cetraria australiensis
- C. fimbriata
- C. flaccidum
- C. floerkeana
- C. fragrans
- C. furcata
- C. glebosa
- Ch. brunneola
- Ch. chlorella
- Ch. debilis
- C. homosekikaica
- Ch. pusilla
- Chrysothrix candelaris
- Ch. trichialis
- C. humilis
- C. humilis
- C. hyperelloides
- C. imbricata
- C. inflata
- C. krempelhuberi
- C. laeve
- Clauzadeana macula
- C. leucocarpum
- C. macilenta
- C. merochlorophaea
- C. norpruinata
- C. nudicaulis
- Coccocarpia palmicola
- C. ochrochlora
- C. paeminosa
- C. pertricosa
- C. pleurota
- C. pruinata
- C. pyxidata
- C. quadriloculare
- C. ramulosa
- C. retipora
- C. rigida
- C. rigida
- C. salicinum
- C. sarmentosa
- C. scabriuscula
- C. schizopora
- C. staufferi
- C. subcariosa
- C. subflaccidum
- C. subradiata
- C. subsquamosa
- C. sulcata
- C. tenerrima
- C. tessellata
- C. trabinellum
- C. tricolor
- C. victorianum
- C. vitellina
- C. xanthostigma
- C. xanthostigmoides
- Cyphelium trachylioides
- D. euganeus
- D. gyrophoricus
- Dibaeis arcuata
- Diplotomma canescens
- Dirinaria applanata
- D. muscorum
- D. scruposus
- D. thunbergianus
- E. helmsianum
- E. pusillum
- F. crustata
- F. decipiens
- Fellhanera parvula
- F. granulans
- F. haysomii
- F. rutidota
- F. springtonensis
- F. subimmixta
- Fuscidea australis
- Halecania australis
- H. australis
- H. beaugleholei
- H. billardierei
- H. enteromorphoides
- Hertelidea pseudobotryosa
- H. foveata
- H. friesii
- H. immaculata
- H. kosciuskoensis
- H. lugubris
- H. muelleri
- H. mundata
- H. procellarum
- H. pulverata
- H. revoluta
- H. scalaris
- H. subphysodes
- H. subphysodes
- H. tetrapla
- H. tubularis
- H. turgidula
- Hyperphyscia adglutinata
- Immersaria athroocarpa
- Imshaugia aleurites
- L. atlantica
- L. atromorio
- L. bicincta
- L. caesioalba
- L. caesiorubella
- L. capensis
- L. contigua
- L. crassilabra
- L. demersa
- L. dispersa
- L. elaeochroma
- L. epibryon
- L. epibryon
- Leprocaulon microscopicum
- Leptogium coralloideum
- L. farinacea
- L. flavidomarginata
- L. fuscoatrula
- L. galactiniza
- L. intricata
- L. isidiophora
- L. jackii
- L. lapicida
- L. lobificans
- L. lugubris
- L. ochroleuca
- L. oreinoides
- L. placodiolica
- L. planaica
- L. pseudistera
- L. pseudogangaleoides
- L. scrobiculata
- L. stigmatea
- L. sublapicida
- L. swartzii
- L. vouauxii
- M. aeneofusca
- Malcolmiella cinereovirens
- M. assimilata
- M. australis
- M. denigrata
- Melanelia piliferella
- M. hypnorum
- M. nothofagi
- M. platytrema
- Neophyllis melacarpa
- Normandina pulchella
- O. africana
- O. pallescens
- Orphniospora moriopsis
- P. adscendens
- P. afrorevoluta
- P. angustata
- Pannaria elixii
- P. arandensis
- Parmeliopsis ambigua
- P. borreri
- P. chinense
- P. clavuliferum
- P. conlabrosa
- P. contraponenda
- P. crocata
- P. crustulata
- P. desfontainii
- P. didactyla
- P. dilacerata
- P. dolichorrhiza
- P. elliptica
- Peltula euploca
- P. endoleuca
- P. erumpens
- P. gibberosa
- P. glauca
- P. haitiense
- P. hispidula
- P. jackii
- P. labrosa
- Placopsis perrugosa
- Placynthiella icmalea
- P. laeta
- P. leptocarpa
- P. leucothelia
- P. lophocarpa
- P. neglecta
- P. nigrum
- P. nubila
- Poeltiaria corralensis
- P. orbicularis
- P. poncinsii
- P. protosignifera
- P. pseudocoralloidea
- P. pseudorelicina
- P. pseudotenuirima
- P. reticulatum
- Protoparmelia badia
- Pseudephebe pubescens
- P. signifera
- Psilolechia lucida
- P. speirea
- P. subalbicans
- P. subfatiscens
- P. subradiatum
- P. subrudecta
- P. subtinctorium
- P. subventosa
- P. sulcata
- P. tenuirima
- P. tribacia
- P. wilsonii
- R. asperata
- R. disporum
- R. geographicum
- Relicina subnigra
- R. exigua
- R. fimbriata
- R. glaucescens
- R. inflata
- R. insularis
- R. murrayi
- R. obscuratum
- R. occulta
- R. oxydata
- R. petraeoides
- R. plicatula
- R. psephota
- R. pyrina
- R. stuartii
- R. subnexa
- R. thiomela
- R. tinei
- R. unilateralis
- Sarcogyne regularis
- Schaereria fuscocinerea
- S. corticatulum
- S. ramulosum
- T. atra
- T. chrysophthalmus
- T. fasciculatus
- Thamnolia vermicularis
- Th.hookeri
- Th. scutellatum
- Toninia bullata
- Trapelia coarctata
- Trapeliopsis granulosa
- Tremolecia atrata
- T. sieberianus
- T. sorediata
- T. velifer
- Tylothallia pahiensis
- U. cylindrica
- U. hirsuta
- U. hyperborea
- U. inermis
- U. maculata
- U. molliuscula
- U. polyphylla
- U. rubicunda
- U. scabrida
- U. subalpina
- U. subglabra
- U. torulosa
- V. baldensis
- V. hydrela
- V. nigrescens
- X. amplexula
- X. mexicana
- X. scabrosa
- X. arapilensis
- X. atrocapnodes
- X. australasica
- X. austroalpina
- X. barbatica
- X. barbellata
- X. bicontinens
- X. burmeisteri
- X. cheelii
- X. congensis
- X. congesta
- X. consociata
- X. cordillerana
- X. delisei
- X. delisiella
- X. dichotoma
- X. digitiformis
- X. dissitifolia
- X. elaeodes
- X. elixii
- X. exillima
- X. filarszkyana
- X. flavescentireagens
- X. franklinensis
- X. furcata
- X. glabrans
- X. glareosa
- X. hypoprotocetrarica
- X. hyposalazinica
- X. iniquita
- X. isidiigera
- X. ligulata
- X. lineola
- X. lithophiloides
- X. loxodella
- X. luminosa
- X. luteonotata
- X. masonii
- X. metaclystoides
- X. metamorphosa
- X. microcephala
- X. mougeotina
- X. murina
- X. nebulosa
- X. neorimalis
- X. neotinctina
- X. nigrocephala
- X. norcapnodes
- X. notata
- X. oleosa
- X. paraparmeliformis
- X. parasitica
- X. parviloba
- X. pertinax
- X. pseudohypoleia
- X. pulla
- X. pustuliza
- X. reptans
- X. rubrireagens
- X. rupestris
- X. scotophylla
- X. semiviridis
- X. spodochroa
- X. squamariatella
- X. stygiodes
- X. subcrustacea
- X. subincerta
- X. subluminosa
- X. subnuda
- X. subprolixa
- X. substrigosa
- X. taractica
- X. tasmanica
- X. tegeta
- X. thamnoides
- X. trirosea
- X. ustulata
- X. verisidiosa
- X. verrucella
- X. xanthofarinosa
- X. xanthomelaena
