= Flora of Australia =

Plant species of Australia

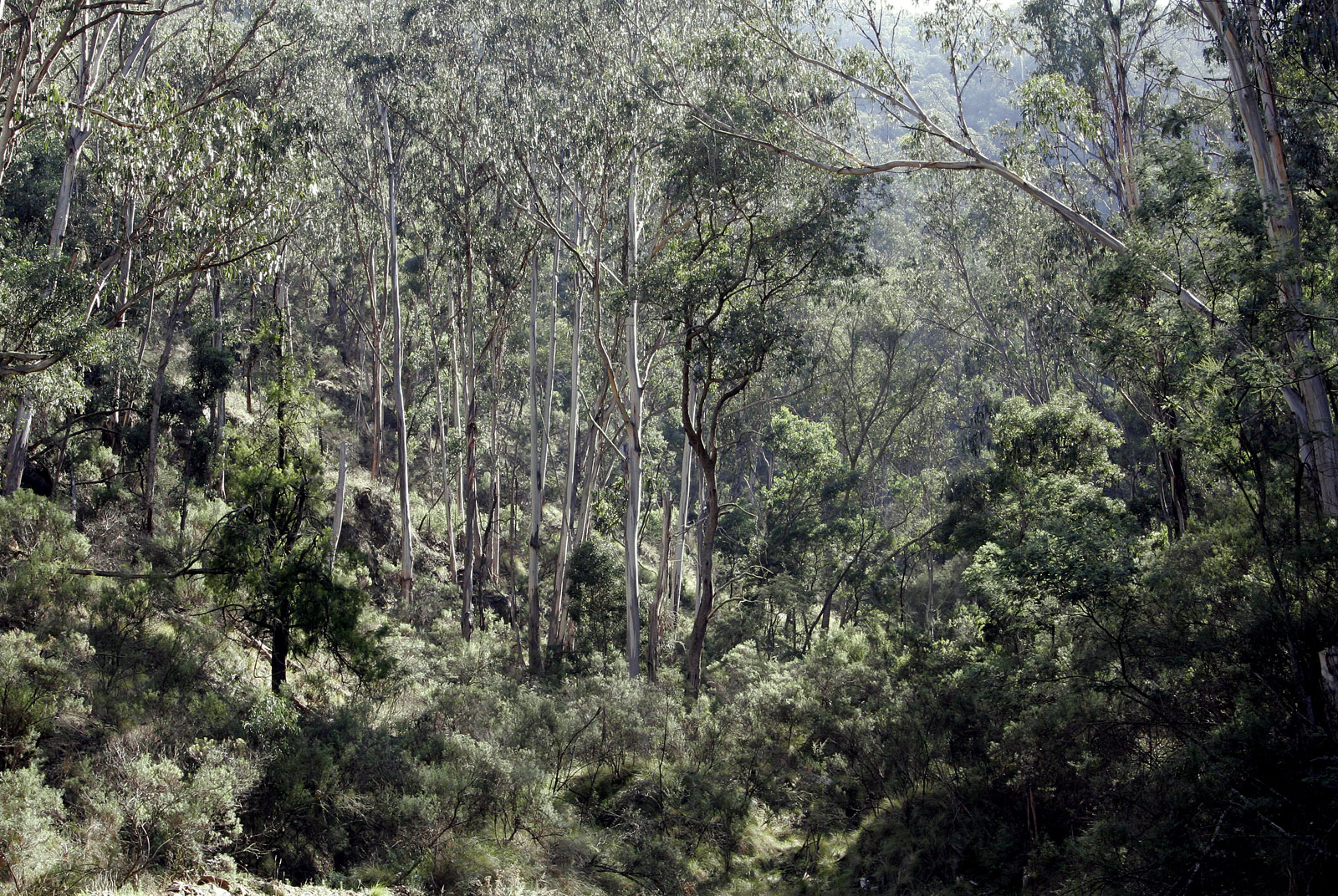
Eucalypt forests in Victoria. Australia's tree flora is dominated by a single genus, Eucalyptus, and related Myrtaceae.

The flora of Australia comprises a vast assemblage of plant species estimated to over 21,000 vascular and 14,000 non-vascular plants, 250,000 species of fungi and over 3,000 lichens. The flora has strong affinities with the flora of Gondwana, and below the family level has a highly endemic angiosperm flora whose diversity was shaped by the effects of continental drift and climate change since the Cretaceous. Prominent features of the Australian flora are adaptations to aridity and fire which include scleromorphy and serotiny. These adaptations are common in species from the large and well-known families Proteaceae (Banksia), Myrtaceae (Eucalyptus - gum trees), and Fabaceae (Acacia - wattle).

The arrival of humans around 50,000 years ago and the settlement by Europeans from 1788, has had a significant impact on the flora. The use of fire-stick farming by Aboriginal people led to significant changes in the distribution of plant species over time, and the large-scale modification or destruction of vegetation for agriculture and urban development since 1788 has altered the composition of most terrestrial ecosystems, leading to the extinction of 61 plant species by 2006, and endangering over 1000 more.

In Australia forest cover is around 17% of the total land area, equivalent to 134,005,100 hectares (ha) of forest in 2020, up from 133,882,200 hectares (ha) in 1990. In 2020, naturally regenerating forest covered 131,614,800 hectares (ha) and planted forest covered 2,390,300 hectares (ha). Of the naturally regenerating forest 0% was reported to be primary forest (consisting of native tree species with no clearly visible indications of human activity) and around 18% of the forest area was found within protected areas. For the year 2015, 67% of the forest area was reported to be under public ownership, 32% private ownership and 1% with ownership listed as other or unknown.

== Origins and history ==
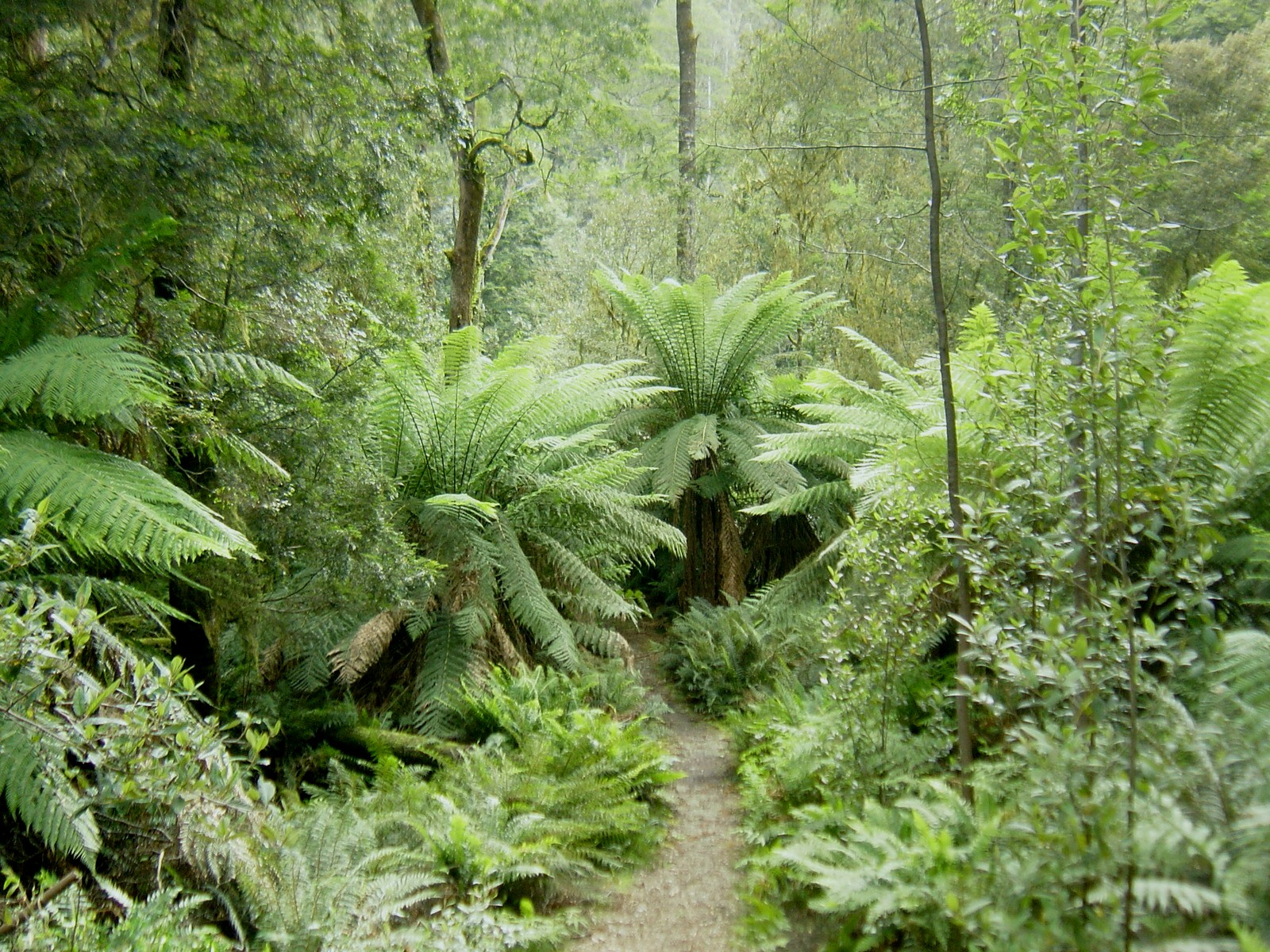
The Tasmanian rainforest is considered a Gondwanan relic.

Australia was part of the southern supercontinent Gondwana, which also included South America, Africa, India, Antarctica and Zealandia. Most of the modern Australian flora had their origin in Gondwana during the Cretaceous when Australia was covered in subtropical rainforest. Australian ferns and gymnosperms bear a strong resemblance to their Gondwanan ancestors, and prominent members of the early Gondwanan angiosperm flora such as the Nothofagus, Myrtaceae and Proteaceae were also present in Australia.

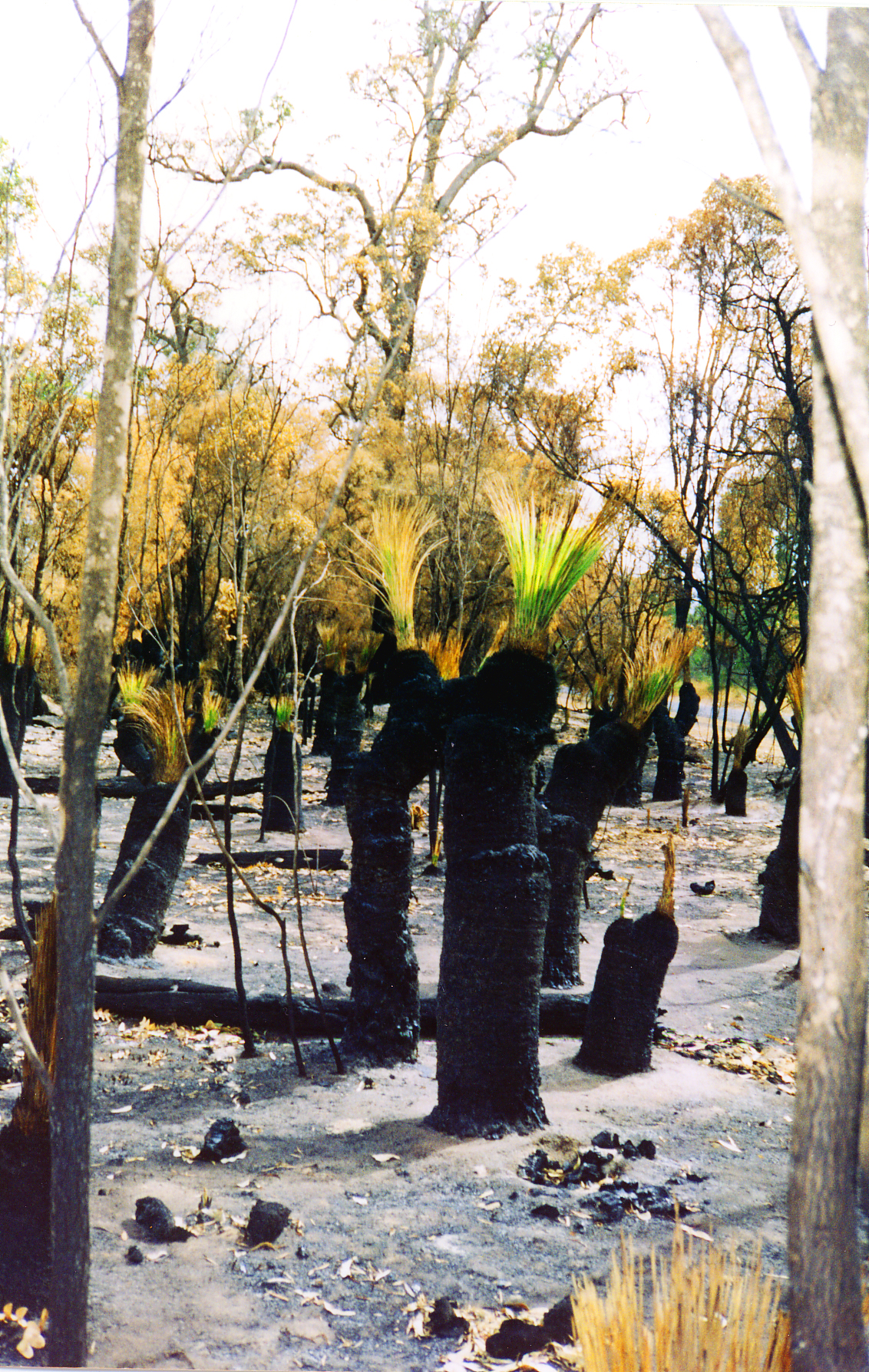
Scrubland with Xanthorrhoea following bushfire

Gondwana began to break up 140 million years ago (MYA); 50 MYA during the Eocene Australia separated from Antarctica, and was relatively isolated until the collision of the Indo-Australian Plate with Asia in the Miocene era 5.3 MYA. As Australia drifted, local and global climatic change had a significant and lasting effect: a circumpolar oceanic current developed, atmospheric circulation increased as Australia moved away from Antarctica, precipitation fell, there was a slow warming of the continent and arid conditions started to develop. These conditions of geographic isolation and aridity led to the development of a more complex flora. From 25 to 10 MYA pollen records suggest the rapid radiation of species like Eucalyptus, Casuarina, Allocasuarina, Banksia and the pea-flowered legumes, and the development of open forest; grasslands started to develop from the Eocene. Collision with the Eurasian Plate also led to additional South-east Asian and cosmopolitan elements entering the flora like the Lepidium and Chenopodioideae.

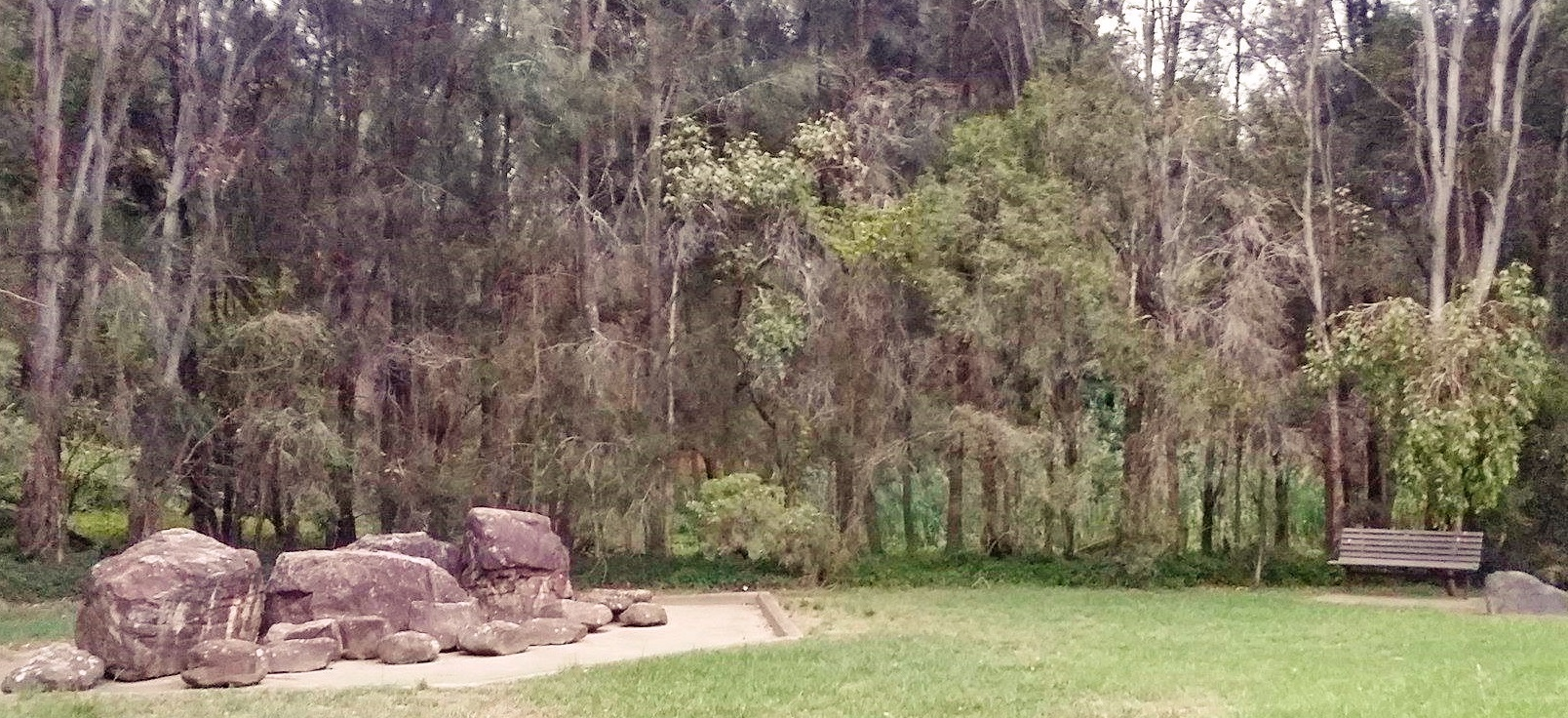
A riparian zone with casuarina and eucalyptus species in Sydney

The development of aridity and the old and nutrient poor soils of the continent led to some unique adaptations in the Australian flora and evolutionary radiation of genera – like Acacia and Eucalyptus – that adapted to those conditions. Hard leaves with a thick outer layer, a condition known as scleromorphy, and C_{4} and CAM carbon fixation which reduce water loss during photosynthesis are two common adaptations in Australian arid-adapted dicot and monocot species respectively.

Rising aridity also increased the frequency of fires in Australia. Fire is thought to have played a role in the development and distribution of fire-adapted species from the Late Pleistocene. An increase in charcoal in sediment around 38,000 years ago coincides with dates for the inhabitation of Australia by the Indigenous Australians and suggests that man-made fires, from practices like fire-stick farming, have played an important role in the establishment and maintenance of sclerophyll forest, especially on the east coast of Australia. Adaptations to fire include lignotubers and epicormic buds in Eucalyptus and Banksia species that allow fast regeneration following fire. Some genera also exhibit serotiny, the release of seed only in response to heat and/or smoke. Xanthorrhoea grass trees and some species of orchids only flower after fire.

== Biogeography ==
In biogeography and zoogeography, Australia alone is sometimes considered a realm (Australian realm), while some authors unite the area with other regions to form the Australasian realm.

In phytogeography, the area is considered a floristic kingdom (Australian kingdom), with the following endemic families, according to Takhtajan: Platyzomataceae (now included in Pteridaceae), Austrobaileyaceae, Idiospermaceae (now part of Calycanthaceae), Gyrostemonaceae, Baueraceae, Davidsoniaceae, Cephalotaceae, Eremosynaceae, Stylobasiaceae, Emblingiaceae, Akaniaceae, Tremandraceae, Tetracarpaeaceae, Brunoniaceae, Blandfordiaceae, Doryanthaceae, Dasypogonaceae and Xanthorrhoeaceae. It is also the center of origin of Eupomatiaceae, Pittosporaceae, Epacridaceae, Stackhousiaceae, Myoporaceae and Goodeniaceae. Other families with high occurrences are Poaceae, Fabaceae, Asteraceae, Orchidaceae, Euphorbiaceae, Cyperaceae, Rutaceae, Myrtaceae (specially Leptospermoideae) and Proteaceae.

== Vegetation types ==
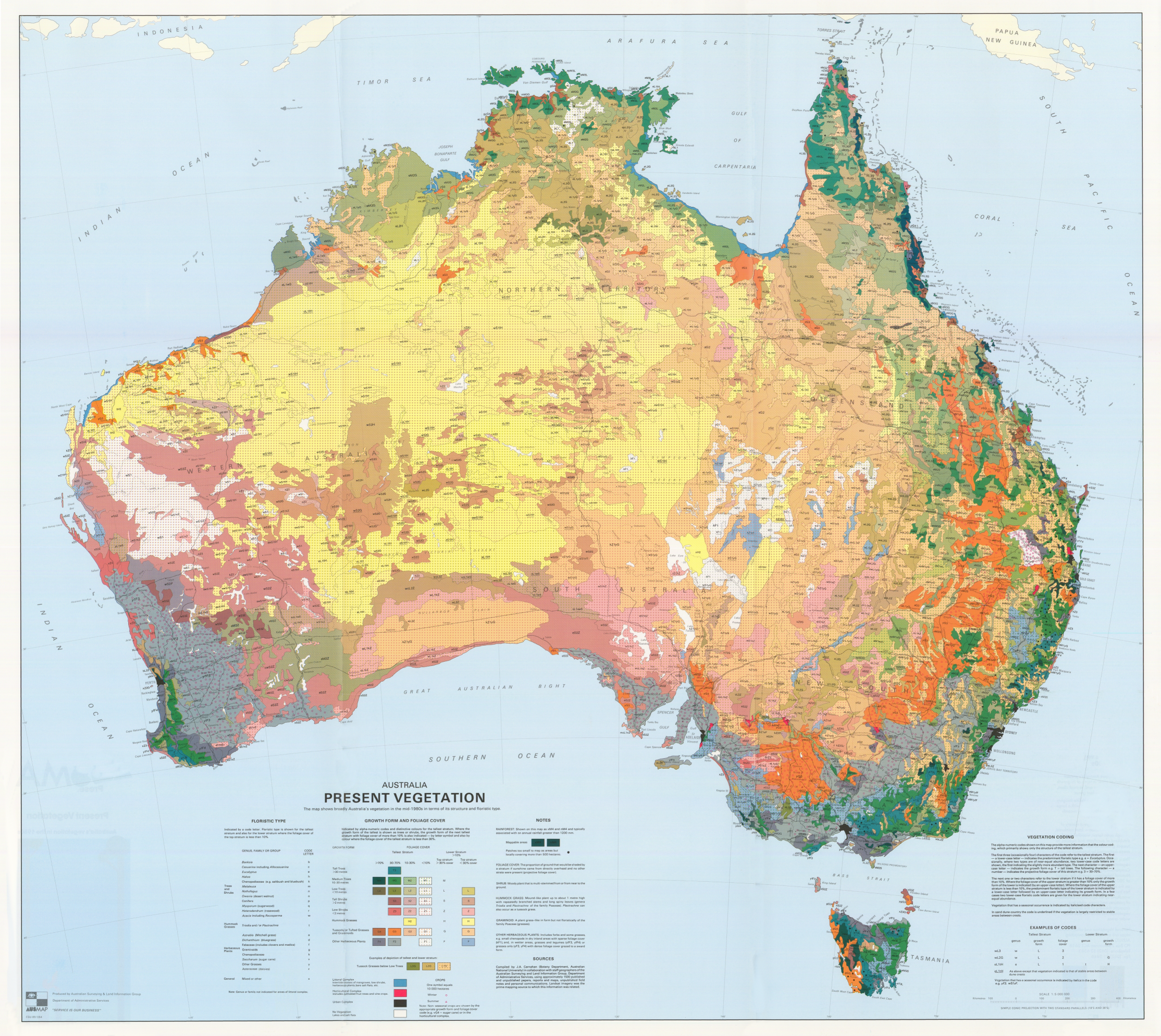
Major vegetation groups in Australia from the 2009 Atlas of Australian Resources

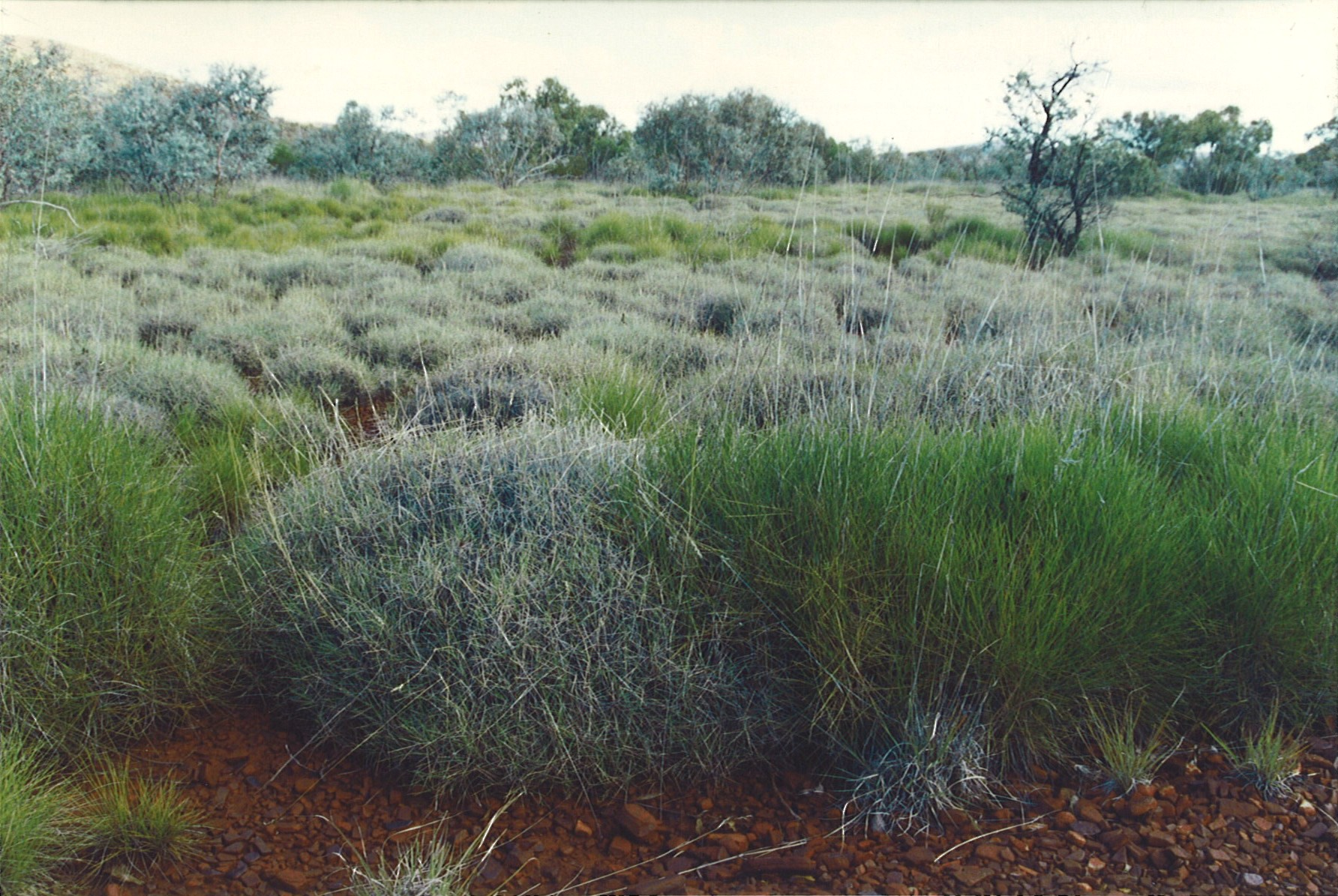
Hummock grassland. The green hummocks are Triodia pungens and the blue-grey hummocks are Triodia basedowii.

Australia's terrestrial flora can be collected into characteristic vegetation groups. The most important determinant is rainfall, followed by temperature which affects water availability. Several schemes of varying complexity have been created. As of 2022, the NVIS (National Vegetation Information System) divides Australia's terrestrial flora into 33 Major Vegetation Groups, and 85 Major Vegetation Subgroups.

According to the scheme the most common vegetation types are those that are adapted to arid conditions where the area has not been significantly reduced by human activities such as land clearing for agriculture. The dominant vegetation type in Australia is the hummock grasslands that occur extensively in arid Western Australia, South Australia and the Northern Territory. It accounts for 23% of the native vegetation, the predominant species of which are from the genus Triodia. Zygochloa also occurs in inland sandy areas like the Simpson Desert.

A further 39% of native vegetation is covered by a combination of:

- Eucalypt woodlands found at the transition between hummock grasslands and higher rainfall areas where conditions still limit tree growth; the woodland may have a grass or shrubby understory. The largest area is in Queensland.
- Acacia forests and woodlands that occur in semi-arid areas where tree growth is stunted. The dominant Acacia species varies with the location, and may include lancewood, bendee, mulga, gidgee and brigalow. The largest area is in Western Australia.
- Acacia shrublands in semi arid and arid regions. The most common are mulga shrublands; the largest area is in Western Australia.
- Tussock grasslands that occur in semi-arid and some temperate parts of Australia; they host a large variety of grasses from more than 10 genera. The largest area is in Queensland.
- Chenopod/samphire shrubs and forblands that are widespread in the near-estuarine, arid and semi-arid areas. Species in chenopod communities are drought and salt tolerant and include the genera Sclerolaena, Atriplex, Maireana, Chenopodium and Rhagodia while samphire representatives include Tecticornia, Salicornia, Sclerostegia and Sarcocornia. Both South and Western Australia have large areas with this vegetation type.

Other groups with restricted areas of less than 70,000 square kilometres include tropical or temperate rainforest and vine thickets, tall or open eucalypt forests, Callitris and Casuarina forests, and woodlands and heath.

== Vascular plants ==
Australia has over 21,077 described species of vascular plants, these include the angiosperms, seed-bearing non-angiosperms (like the conifers and cycads), and the spore-bearing ferns and fern allies. Of these about 11% are naturalised species; the remainder are native or endemic. The vascular plant flora has been extensively catalogued, the work being published in the ongoing Flora of Australia series. A list of vascular plant families represented in Australia using the Cronquist system is also available.

At the higher taxonomic levels the Australian flora is similar to that of the rest of the world; most vascular plant families are represented within the native flora, with the exception of the cacti, birch and a few others, while nine families occur only in Australia. Australia's vascular flora is estimated to be 85% endemic; this high level of vascular plant endemism is largely attributable to the radiation of some families like the Proteaceae, Myrtaceae, and Fabaceae.

=== Angiosperms ===
Largest angiosperm families in Australia
Family	% of total flora^{1}	Notable genera
Fabaceae	12.0	Acacia, Pultenaea, Daviesia, Bossiaea
Myrtaceae	9.3	Callistemon, Eucalyptus, Melaleuca, Leptospermum
Asteraceae	8.0	Brachyscome, Olearia
Poaceae	6.5	Triodia
Proteaceae	5.6	Banksia, Hakea, Grevillea
Cyperaceae	3.3	Cyperus
Orchidaceae	3.0	Caladenia, Pterostylis
Ericaceae	2.1	Leucopogon, Epacris
Euphorbiaceae	2.0	Ricinocarpos
Rutaceae	1.8	Boronia, Correa, Citrus
^{1} Based on total number of species Data from Orchard modified to AGPII classifications.

The native Australian flora contains many monocotyledons. The family with the most species is the Poaceae which includes a huge variety of species, from the tropical bamboo Bambusa arnhemica to the ubiquitous spinifex that thrives in arid Australia from the genus Triodia. There are more than 800 described species of orchid in Australia. About one quarter of these are epiphytes. The terrestrial orchids occur across most of Australia, the majority of species being deciduous – their aboveground parts die back during the dry season and they re-sprout from a tuber when it rains.

Other families with well-known representatives include the alpine Tasmanian button grass, which form tussock-like mounds from the Cyperaceae; the genus Patersonia of temperate iris-like forbs from the Iridaceae; and, the kangaroo paws from the family Haemodoraceae. The Xanthorrhoea grass trees, the screw palms of the Pandanaceae and palms are large monocots present in Australia. There are about 57 native palms; 79% of these only occur in Australia.

The dicots are the most diverse group of angiosperms. Australia's best known species come from three large and very diverse dicot families: the Fabaceae, the Myrtaceae and the Proteaceae. The Myrtaceae is represented by a variety of woody species; gum trees from the genera Eucalyptus, Corymbia and Angophora, Lillipillies (Syzygium), the water-loving Melaleuca and Bottlebrush and the shrubby Darwinia and Leptospermum, commonly known as teatrees, and Geraldton wax. Australia is also a centre of diversity for the Proteaceae, with woody, well-known genera such as Banksia, Dryandra, Grevillea, Hakea, the waratah and Australia's only commercial native food crop, the macadamia. Australia also has representatives of all three legume subfamilies. Caesalpinioideae is notably represented by Cassia trees. The Faboideae or pea-flowered legumes are common and many are well known for their flowers, including the golden peas, Glycine species and the Sturt's desert pea. The Mimosoideae is best known for the huge genus Acacia which includes Australia's floral emblem the golden wattle.

Many plant families that occur in Australia are known for their floral displays that follow seasonal rains. The Asteraceae is well represented by its subfamily Gnaphalieae, which included the paper or everlasting daisies; this group has its greatest diversity in Australia. Other families with flowering shrubs include the Rutaceae, with the fragrant Boronia and Eriostemon, the Myoporaceae with the Eremophila, and members of the Ericaceae with Victoria's Floral Emblem Epacris impressa.

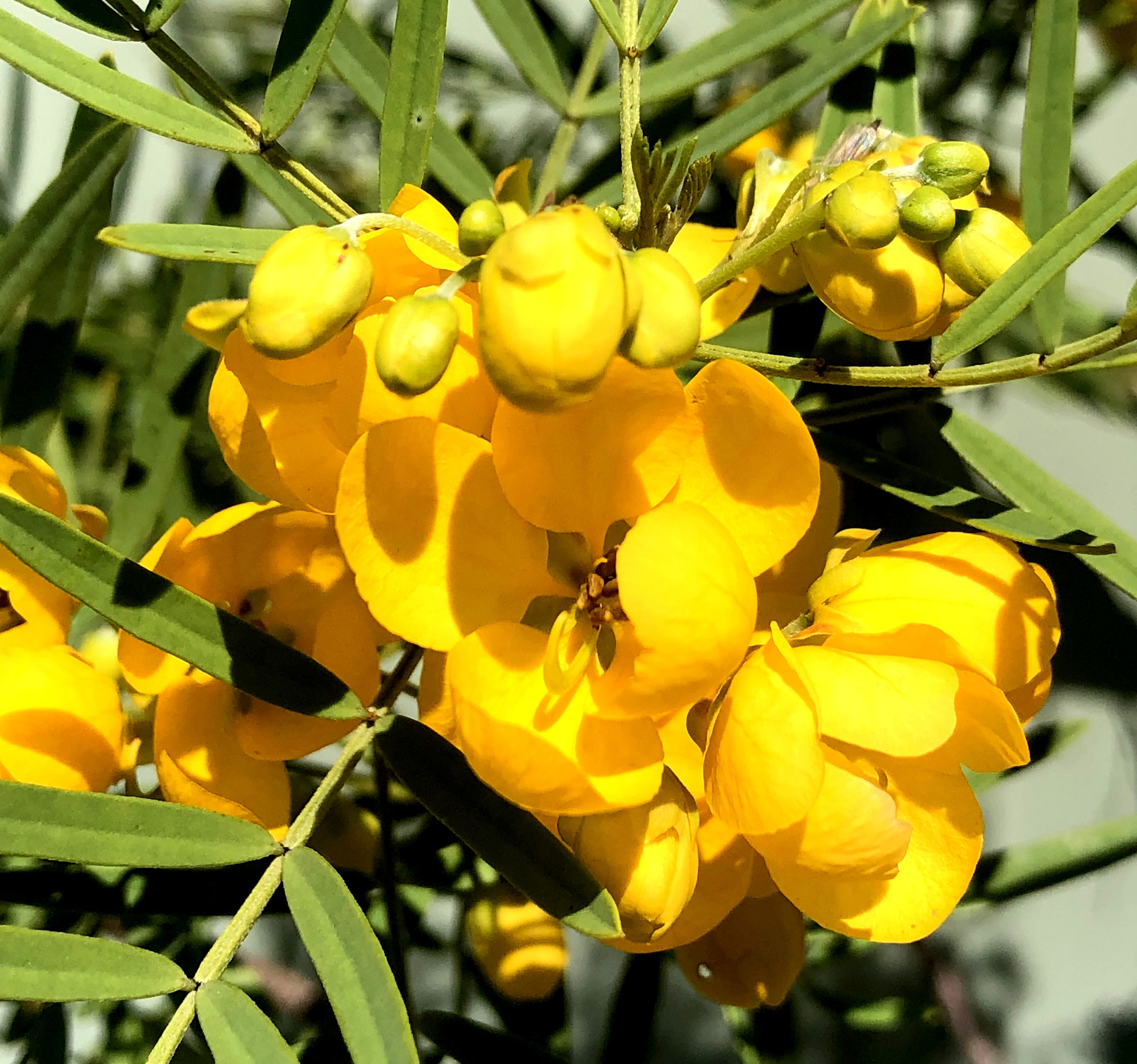
Senna odorata, a fabaceae native to eastern Australia

Amongst the most ancient species of flowering hardwood trees are the Casuarinaceae, including beach, swamp and river oaks, and Fagaceae represented in Australia by three species of Nothofagus. Trees of the Rosales are notably represented by the Moraceae whose species include the Moreton Bay fig and the Port Jackson fig, and the Urticaceae whose members include several tree sized stinging nettles; Dendrocnide moroides is the most virulent. There are also numerous sandalwood species including the quandongs and native cherry, Exocarpus cupressiformis. The bottle tree of the Sterculiaceae is one of 30 tree species from the Brachychiton. There are about 75 native mistletoes that parasitise Australian tree species, including two terrestrial parasitic trees, one of which is the spectacular Western Australian Christmas tree.

Australia's salt marshes and wetlands are covered by a large variety of salt and drought tolerant species from the Amaranthaceae which include the saltbushes (Atriplex) and bluebushes (Maireana and Chenopodium). Many of these plants have succulent leaves; other native succulents are from the genera Carpobrotus, Calandrinia and Portulaca. Succulent stems are present in many of the Euphorbiaceae in Australia, though the best known members are the non-succulent looking fragrant wedding bushes of the genus Ricinocarpos. Carnivorous plants which favour damp habitats are represented by four families including the sundews, bladderworts, pitcher-plants from the Cephalotaceae, which are endemic to Western Australia, and the Nepenthaceae.

Aquatic monocots and dicots both occur in Australian waters. Australia has about 51,000 square kilometres of seagrass meadows and the most diverse group seagrass species in the world. There are 22 species found in temperate waters and 15 in tropical waters out of a known 70 species worldwide. Aquatic dicots include the mangroves; in Australia there are 39 mangrove species that cover 11,500 square kilometres and comprise the third largest area of mangroves in the world. Other native aquatic dicots here include water lilies and water milfoils.

=== Gymnosperms ===
Gymnosperms present in Australia include the cycads and conifers. There are 69 species of cycad from 4 genera and 3 families of eastern and northern Australia, with a few in south-western Western Australia and central Australia. Native conifers are distributed across 3 taxonomic families (Cupressaceae, Podocarpaceae, Araucariaceae), 14 genera and 43 species, of which 39 are endemic. Most species are present in wetter mountainous areas consistent with their Gondwanan origins, including the genera Athrotaxis, Actinostrobus, Microcachrys, Microstrobos, Diselma and the Tasmanian Huon pine, sole member of the genus Lagarostrobos. Callitris is a notable exception; species from this genus are found mainly in drier open woodlands. The most recently discovered species of conifer is the living fossil Wollemi pine, which was first described in 1994. Although many Australian conifers are referred to as 'pines', there are no members of the pine family (Pinaceae) native to Australia.

=== Ferns and fern allies ===
Spore bearing vascular plants include the ferns and fern allies. True ferns are found over most of the country and are most abundant in tropical and subtropical areas with high rainfall. Australia has a native flora of 30 families, 103 genera and 390 species of ferns, with another 10 species being naturalised. The "fern allies" are represented by 44 native species of whisk ferns, horsetails and lycophytes. Ferns prefer a cool and damp environment since water is required for reproduction, the majority of Australian species are found in bushland and rainforest, there are aquatic, epiphytic (Platycerium, Huperzia and Asplenium), and terrestrial species including large tree ferns from the genera Cyathea and Dicksonia.

== Non-vascular plants ==
The algae are a large and diverse group of photosynthetic organisms. Many studies of algae include the cyanobacteria, in addition to micro and macro eukaryotic types that inhabit both fresh and saltwater. Currently, about 10,000 to 12,000 species of algae are known for Australia. The algal flora of Australia is unevenly documented: northern Australia remains largely uncollected for seaweeds and marine phytoplankton, descriptions of freshwater algae are patchy, and the collection of terrestrial algae has been almost completely neglected.

The bryophytes – mosses, liverworts and hornworts – are primitive, usually terrestrial, plants that inhabit the tropics, cool-temperate regions and montane areas; there are some specialised members that are adapted to semi-arid and arid Australia. There are slightly fewer that 1,000 recognised species of moss in Australia. The five largest genera are the Fissidens, Bryum, Campylopus, Macromitrium and Andreaea. There are also over 800 species of liver- and horn-worts in 148 genera in Australia.

== Fungi ==
The fungal flora of Australia is not well characterised; Australia is estimated to have about 250,000 fungal species of which roughly 5% have been described. Knowledge of distribution, substrates and habitats is poor for most species, with the exception of common plant pathogens.

=== Lichens ===
Lichens are composite organisms comprising, in most cases, an Ascomycete fungus and a unicellular green alga, their classification is based on the type of fungi. The lichen flora of Australia and its island territories, including Christmas Island, Heard Island, Macquarie Island and Norfolk Island, currently comprises 3,238 species and infra-specific taxa in 422 genera, 34% of which are considered to be endemic.

== Use by humans ==
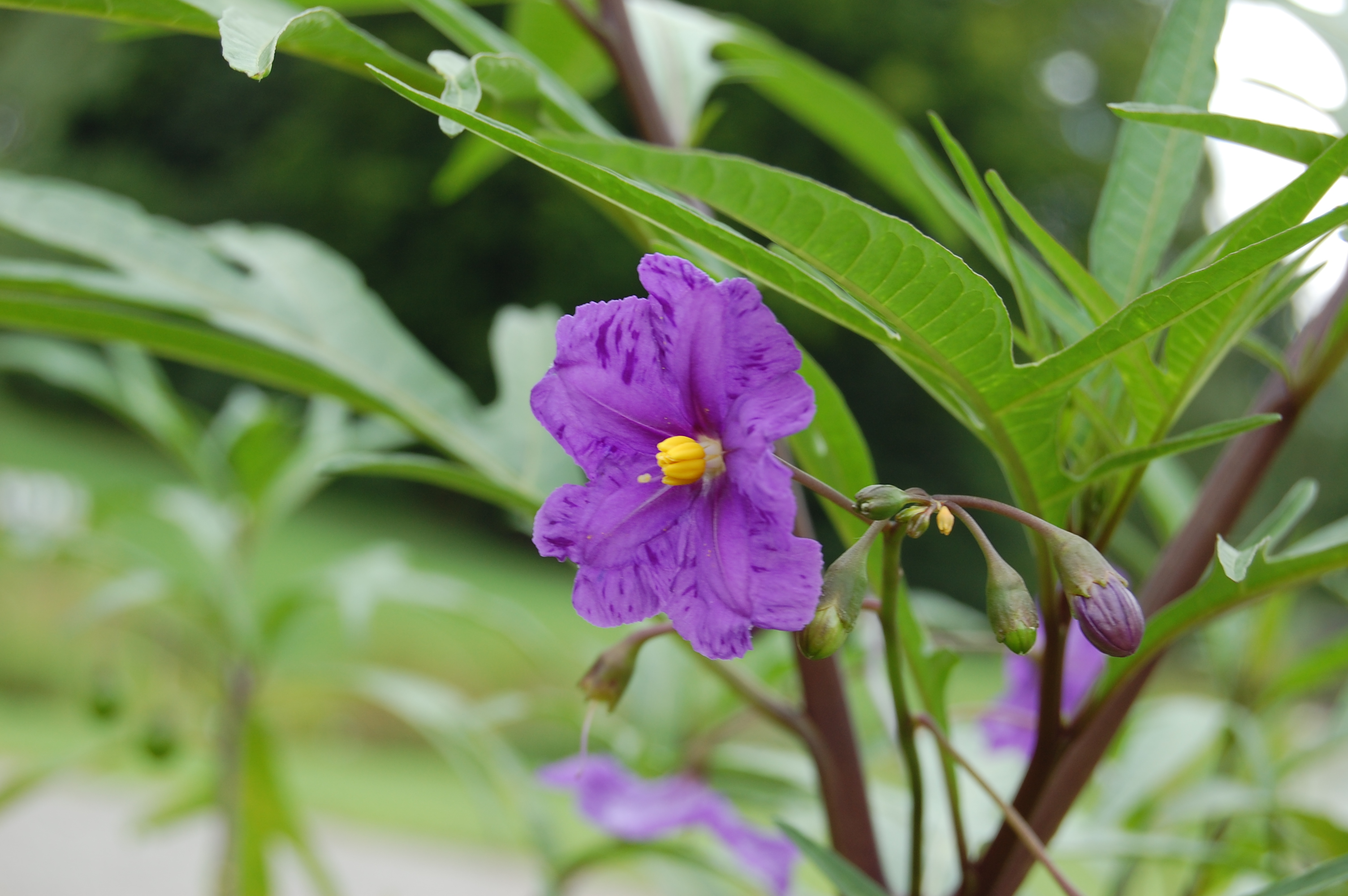
Solanum laciniatum

The first Australian plants recognised and classified in Linnaean taxonomy were a species of Acacia and Synaphea in 1768 as Adiantum truncatum and Polypodium spinulosum respectively by Dutch philologist Pieter Burman the Younger, who stated they were from Java. Later, both were found to be from Western Australia, likely to have been collected near the Swan River, possibly on a 1697 visit there of fellow Dutchman Willem de Vlamingh. This was followed by Cook's expedition making landfall at what is now Botany Bay in April 1770, and the early work of Banks, Solander and Parkinson. Botanical exploration was enabled by the founding of the permanent colony at Port Jackson in 1788, and the subsequent expeditions along Australia's coastline.

The Australian flora was utilised by the Indigenous inhabitants of Australia. Indigenous Australians used thousands of species for food, medicine, shelter, tools and weapons. For example, the starchy roots of Clematis microphylla were used in western Victoria to make a dough that was baked, and the leaves of the plant were used as a poultice applied to skin irritations and blisters.

=== Since European colonisation ===
Forestry species include a number of eucalypts used for paper and timber, Huon pine, hoop pine, cypress pine, Australian Blackwood, and sandalwood from Santalum spicatum and S. lanceolatum. A significant area used by the pastoral industry is based on native pasture species including Mitchell grass, saltbush, bluebush, wallaby grass, spear grass, tussock grasses and kangaroo grass.

=== Commercial use ===
Until recently the macadamia nut and Tetragonia tetragonoides were the only Australian food plant species widely cultivated. Although commercial cultivation of macadamia started in Australia in the 1880s, it became an established large-scale crop in Hawaii. The development of a range of native food crops began in the late 1970s with the assessment of species for commercial potential. In the mid-1980s restaurants and wholesalers started to market various native food plant products. These included wattles for their edible seeds; Davidson's Plum, desert lime, finger lime, quandong, riberry, Kakadu plum, muntries, bush tomato, Illawarra plum for fruit; warrigal greens as a leaf vegetable; and, lemon aspen, lemon myrtle, mountain pepper as spices. A few Australian native plants are used by the pharmaceutical industry, such as two scopolamine and hyoscyamine producing Duboisia species and Solanum aviculare and S. laciniatum for the steroid solasodine. Essential oils from Melaleuca, Callitris, Prostanthera, Eucalyptus and Eremophila are also used medicinally. Due to the wide variety of flowers and foliage, Australian plant species are also popular for floriculture internationally.

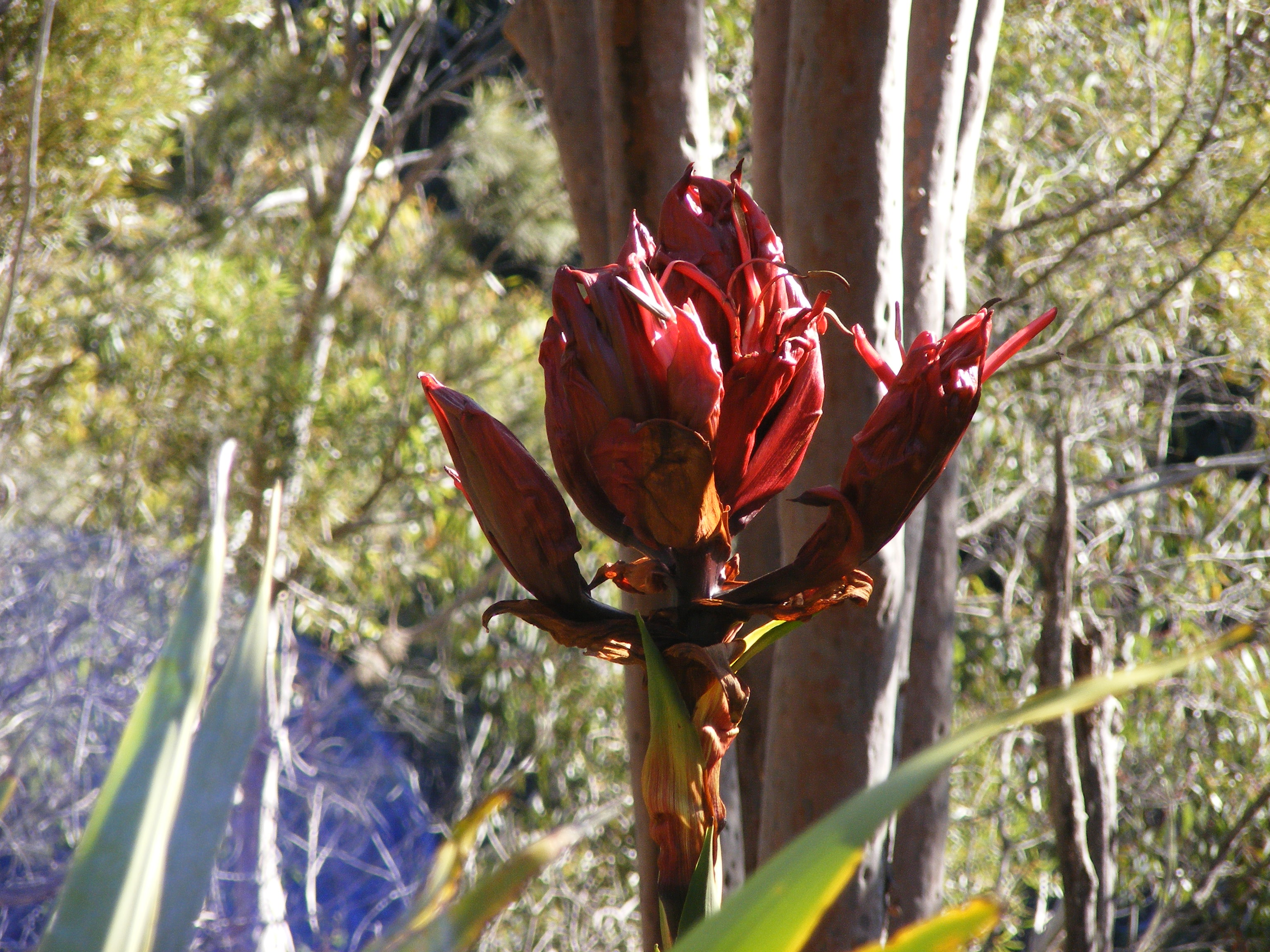
Gymea Lily growing in Heathcote National Park, Sydney

== Conservation ==
Modification of the Australian environment by Indigenous Australians and following European settlement has affected the extent and the distribution of the flora.

=== Threats ===
The changes since 1788 have been rapid and significant: displacement of Indigenous Australians disrupted fire régimes that had been in place for thousands of years; forestry practices have modified the structure of native forests; wetlands have been filled in; and broad scale land-clearing for crops, grazing and urban development has reduced native vegetation cover and led to landscape salinisation, increased sediment, nutrient and salt loads in rivers and streams, loss of habitat and a decline in biodiversity. The intentional and unintentional release of invasive plant and animal species into delicate ecosystems is a major threat to floral biodiversity; 20 introduced species have been declared Weeds of National Significance.

=== Threatened plant biodiversity ===
As of 2006, 61 plant species were known to have become extinct since European settlement; and a further 1,239 species were considered threatened.

=== Protected areas ===
Protected areas have been created in every state and territory to protect and preserve the country's unique ecosystems. These protected areas include national parks and other reserves, as well as 64 wetlands registered under the Ramsar Convention and 16 World Heritage Sites. As of 2002, 10.8% (774,619.51 km^{2}) of the total land area of Australia is within protected areas. Protected marine zones have been created in many areas to preserve marine biodiversity; as of 2002, these areas cover about 7% (646,000 km^{2}) of Australia's marine jurisdiction.

=== Biodiversity hotspots ===
In 2003, the Australian Government's Threatened Species Scientific Committee identified 15 biodiversity hotspots in Australian and 85 characteristic ecosystems, as classified by the Interim Biogeographic Regionalisation for Australia. Some effort is being made to ensure each is represented within a protected area under Australia's Biodiversity Action Plan.

== See also ==
- List of electronic floras
- List of Australian floral emblems
- List of extinct flora of Australia
- List of flora on stamps of Australia
- List of threatened flora of Australia
- Systematic Census of Australian Plants

Region specific articles

- Flora of the Australian Capital Territory
- Flora of Western Australia
- List of Nature Conservation Act endangered flora of Queensland
- List of Nature Conservation Act extinct in the wild flora of Queensland
- List of Nature Conservation Act rare flora of Queensland
- List of Nature Conservation Act vulnerable flora of Queensland
