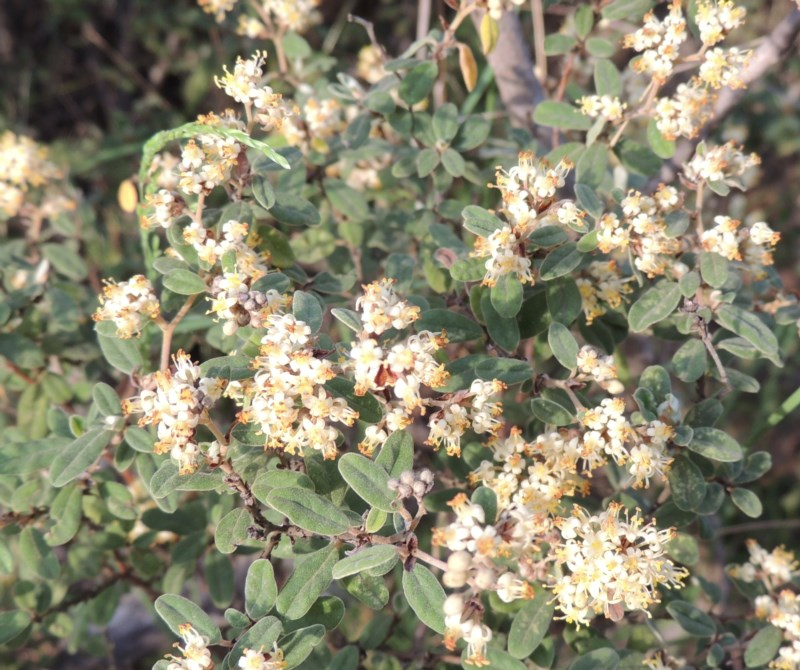
- In Pine Island Reserve

Conservation status
- Vulnerable (EPBC Act)

Scientific classification
- Kingdom: Plantae
- Clade: Tracheophytes
- Clade: Angiosperms
- Clade: Eudicots
- Clade: Rosids
- Order: Rosales
- Family: Rhamnaceae
- Genus: Pomaderris
- Species: P. pallida

Binomial name
- Pomaderris pallida N.A.Wakef.

= Pomaderris pallida =

Species of plant

Pomaderris pallida, commonly known as pale pomaderris, is a species of flowering plant in the family Rhamnaceae and is endemic to the south-east of continental Australia. It is a compact, rounded shrub with hairy stems, narrowly elliptic to narrowly oblong leaves and panicles of cream-coloured flowers.

== Description ==
Pomaderris pallida is a compact, rounded shrub that typically grows to a height of 1–2 m (3 ft 3 in – 6 ft 7 in), its stems covered with small woolly, whitish, star-shaped hairs. The leaves are narrowly elliptic to narrowly oblong, 8–20 mm (0.31–0.79 in) long and 3–6 mm (0.12–0.24 in) wide, both surfaces densely covered with velvety, star-shaped hairs. The flowers are borne in small, leafy panicles 20–80 mm (0.79–3.15 in) long with five cream-coloured, petal-like sepals but there are no petals. Flowering occurs from September to December and the fruit is a hairy capsule.

== Taxonomy ==
Pomaderris pallida was first formally described in 1951 by Norman Arthur Wakefield in The Victorian Naturalist from specimens collected by Richard Hind Cambage near the junction of the Murrumbidgee and Cotter Rivers in 1911. The specific epithet (pallida) means "pale".

== Distribution and habitat ==
This pomaderris grows in open forest and scrub in woodland but is only known from a few populations in the Australian Capital Territory and south-eastern New South Wales.

== Conservation status ==
Pomaderris pallida is list as "vulnerable" under the Australian Government Environment Protection and Biodiversity Conservation Act 1999 and the New South Wales Government Biodiversity Conservation Act 2016.
