= Mallee Woodlands and Shrublands =

Vegetation group which occurs in semi-arid areas of southern Australia

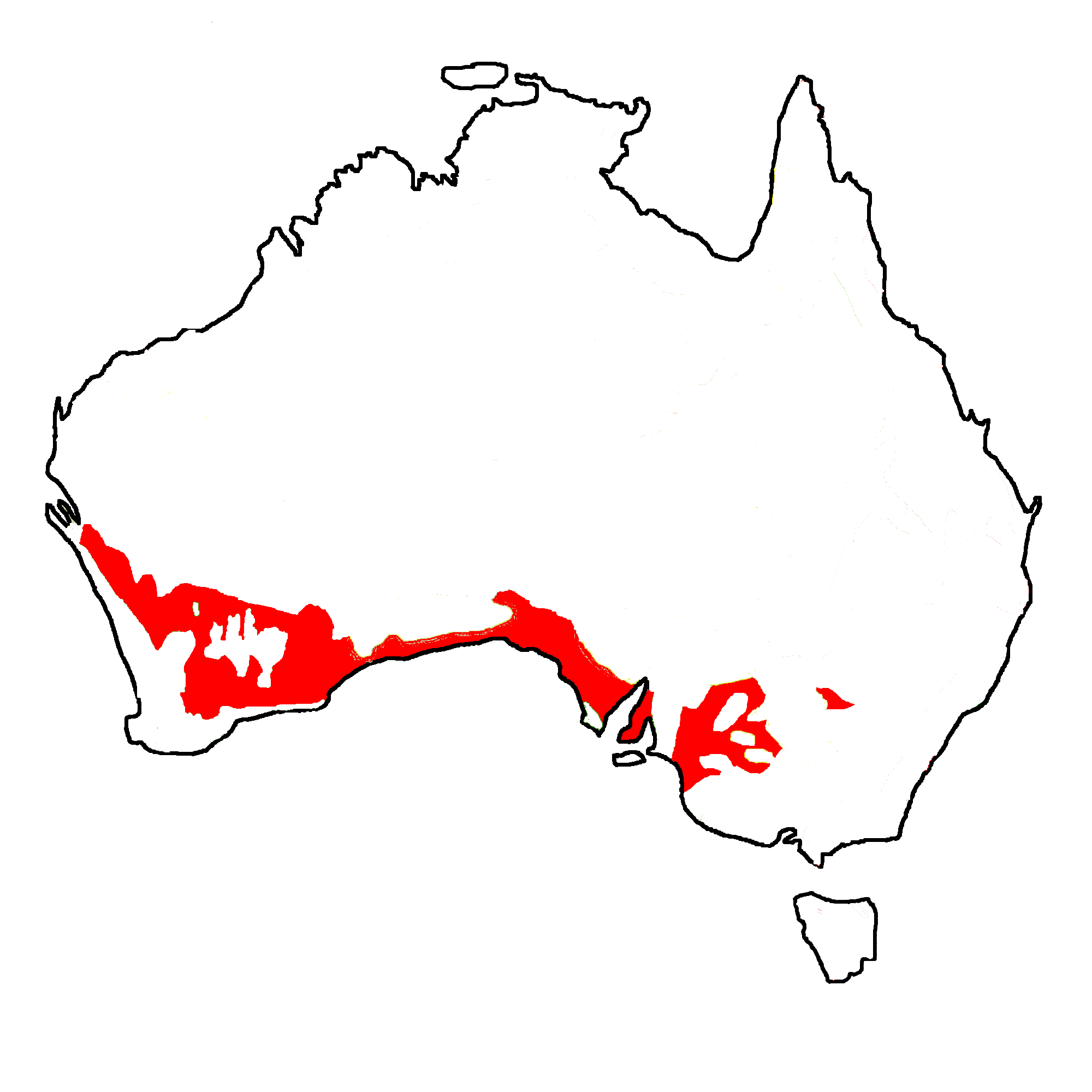
Extent of Mallee Woodlands and Shrublands plant communities across southern Australia

Mallee Woodlands and Shrublands is one of 32 Major Vegetation Groups defined by the Australian Government Department of the Environment and Energy and one of the 189 habitats in the HOTW habitats of the World classification.

== Description ==
"Mallee" refers to the growth habit of a group of (mainly) eucalypt species that grow to a height of 2–9 m (6 ft 7 in – 29 ft 6 in), have many stems arising from a lignotuber and have a leafy canopy that shades 30–70% of the ground. The term is also applied to a vegetation association where these mallee eucalypts grow, on land that is generally flat without hills or tall trees and where the climate is semi-arid.

Of the 32 Major Vegetation Groups classified under the National Vegetation Information System, "Mallee Woodlands and Shrublands" (MVG14):

- are semi-arid areas dominated by mallee eucalypts;
- may also have co-dominant species of Callitris, Melaleuca, Acacia and Hakea;
- have an open tree or shrub layer with more than 10% foliage cover and more than 20% crown cover, distinguishing MVG 14 from "Mallee Open Woodland" (MVG14) and "Sparse Mallee Shrublands" (MVG32);
- have an understorey composition strongly influenced by rainfall, soil type and fire regime;
- are among the most fire prone of all plant communities in semi-arid and arid zones.

The major vegetation subgroups of MVG14, based mainly on the perennial components of the understorey are:

- mallee with hummock grass (Triodia scariosa and Triodia irritans);
- mallee with a dense, shrubby understorey;
- mallee with an open shrubby understorey;
- mallee with a tussock grass (Themeda, Poa and Astrebla species) understorey.

Mallee woodlands and shrublands occur in 39 IBRA biogeographic regions.

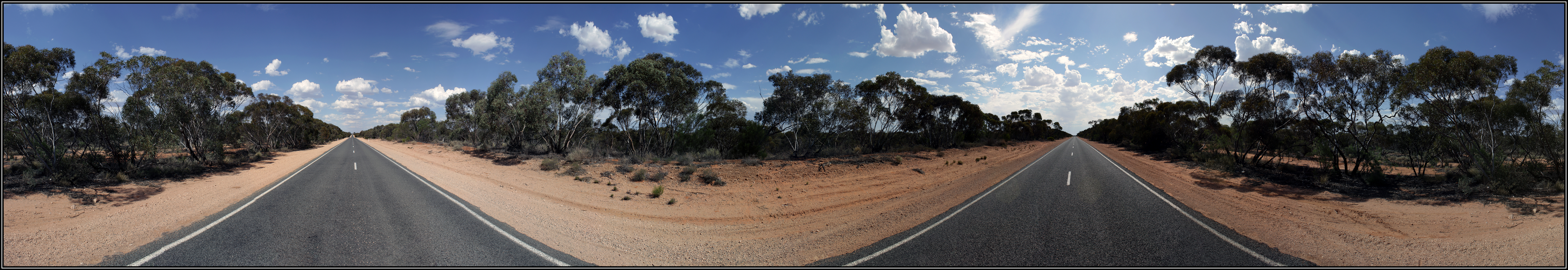
360° panorama of Mallee Woodlands and Shrublands in northwest Victoria.

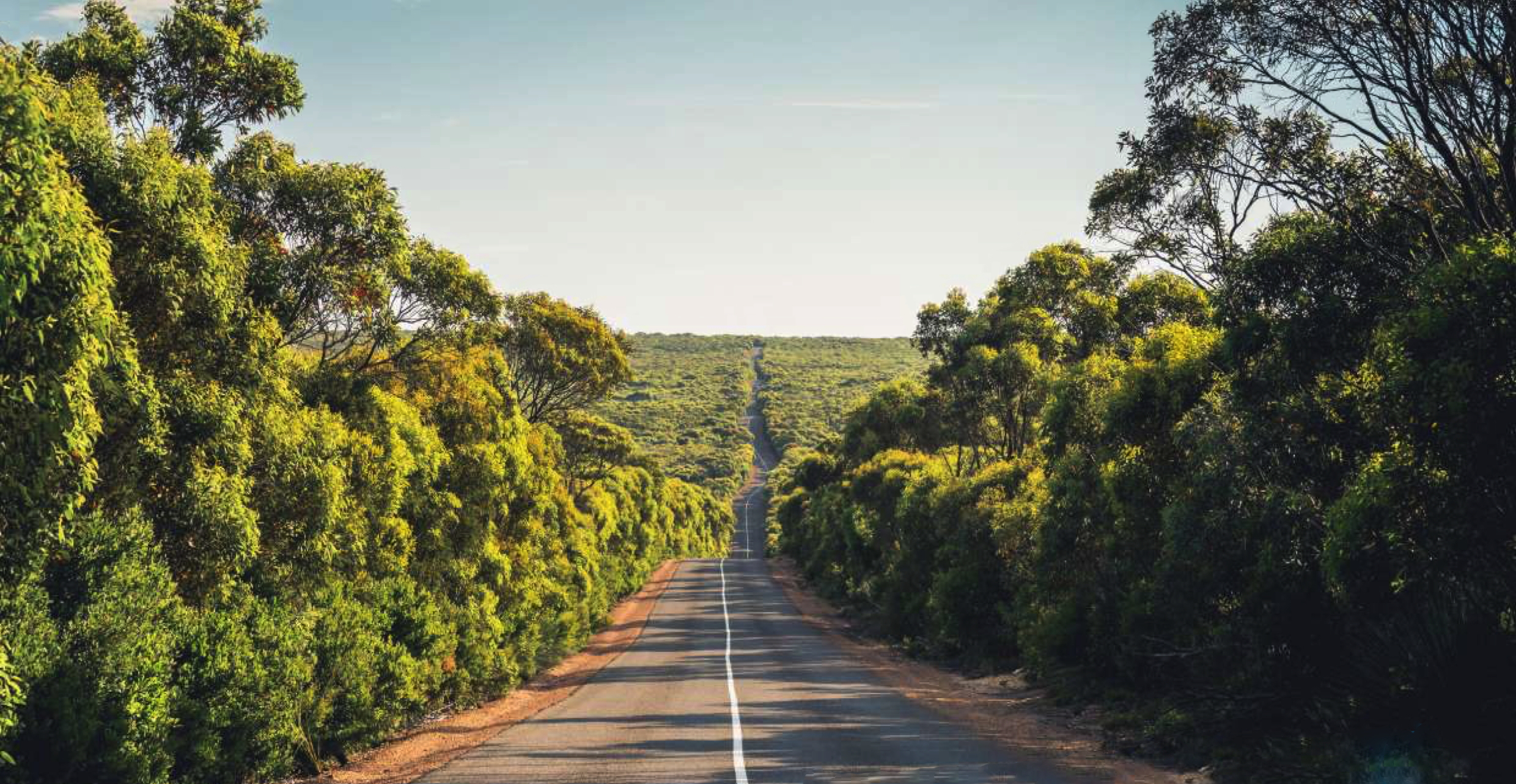
Dense mallee country in South Australia

== Changes since European settlement ==
The present extent of this vegetation group is estimated to be about 214,000 km^{2} (83,000 sq mi) but the estimate prior to 1750 is 318,000 km^{2} (123,000 sq mi). In 2001, the area covered by this vegetation group is estimated to be 65% of its pre-1750 coverage.

The most extensive area of this vegetation association in Australia today is found in the Great Victoria Desert. Prior to 1750, the largest area is estimated to have occurred in the Murray-Darling basin.

About 33% of the clearing of this vegetation type is estimated to have accounted for 10% of the total area of land clearing in Australia. In South Australia, clearing of the mallee started in the late 19th century, following the introduction of the stump-jump plough in 1876.
