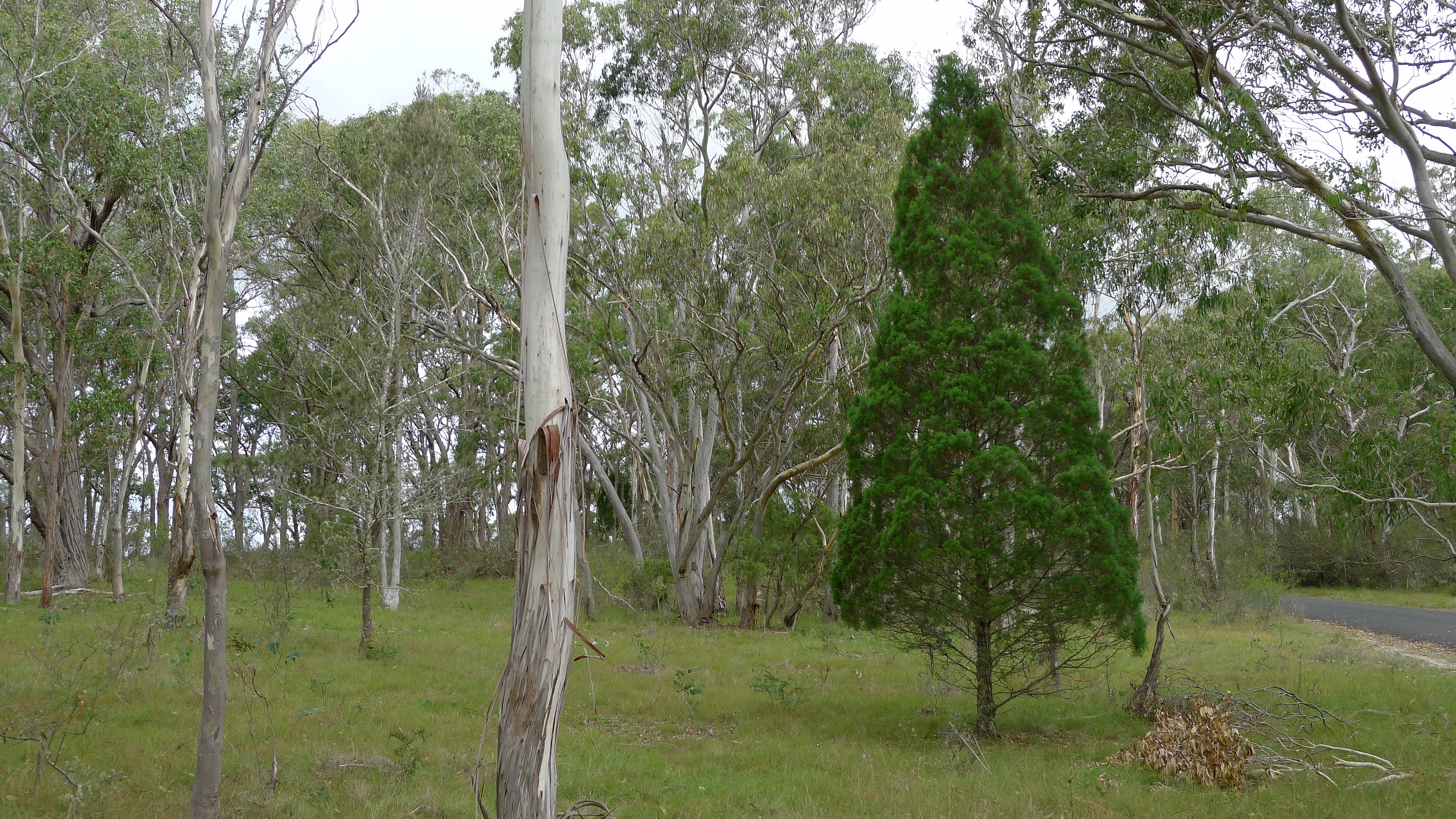
- In Oxley Wild Rivers National Park

Conservation status
- Least Concern (IUCN 3.1)

Scientific classification
- Kingdom: Plantae
- Clade: Tracheophytes
- Clade: Gymnosperms
- Division: Pinophyta
- Class: Pinopsida
- Order: Cupressales
- Family: Cupressaceae
- Genus: Callitris
- Species: C. endlicheri

Binomial name
- Callitris endlicheri (Parl.) F.M.Bailey

Synonyms
- Frenela calcarata A.Cunn. ex Mirb.; Juniperus ericoides Nois. ex Desf.; Juniperus rigida Nois. ex Desf.; Callitris pyramidalis Sweet; Frenela rigida Endl.; Frenela endlicheri Parl.; Frenela gunnii var. mucronata Parl.; Callitris calcarata R.Br. ex F.Muell.; Frenela endlicheri var. mucronata (Parl.) Benth.

= Callitris endlicheri =

Species of conifer

Callitris endlicheri, the black cypress pine, is a species of conifer in the cypress family, Cupressaceae, that is native to eastern Australia.

== Distribution and habitat ==
C. endlicheri is widespread in eastern Australia along the Great Dividing Range and can be found in Australian Capital Territory, New South Wales, Queensland, and Victoria at elevations of 350–1,100 m (1,150–3,610 ft). It commonly grows on rocky hills and ridges and can be found in dry sclerophyll woodlands and shrublands.

== Description ==
Callitris endlicheri is a coniferous tree growing 5–15 m (16–49 ft) tall with tough, furrowed bark. The branches may be erect or spreading with keeled green leaves measuring 2–4 mm (0.08–0.2 in) long. The species is monoecious, with female cones occurring solitarily or in clusters on slender fruiting branchlets. The cones are smooth, almost spherical, measuring 15–20 mm (0.6–0.8 in) in diameter and containing a number of sticky seeds coated in resin. Cones may persist on the tree for a number of years.

== Uses ==
The Wiradjuri people of New South Wales, who refer to this species as kara, use the trunks of young trees to make spears, the wood and dry needles as kindling, and the resinous sap as a glue and medicine. It is sometimes logged for commercial purposes.

== Gallery ==
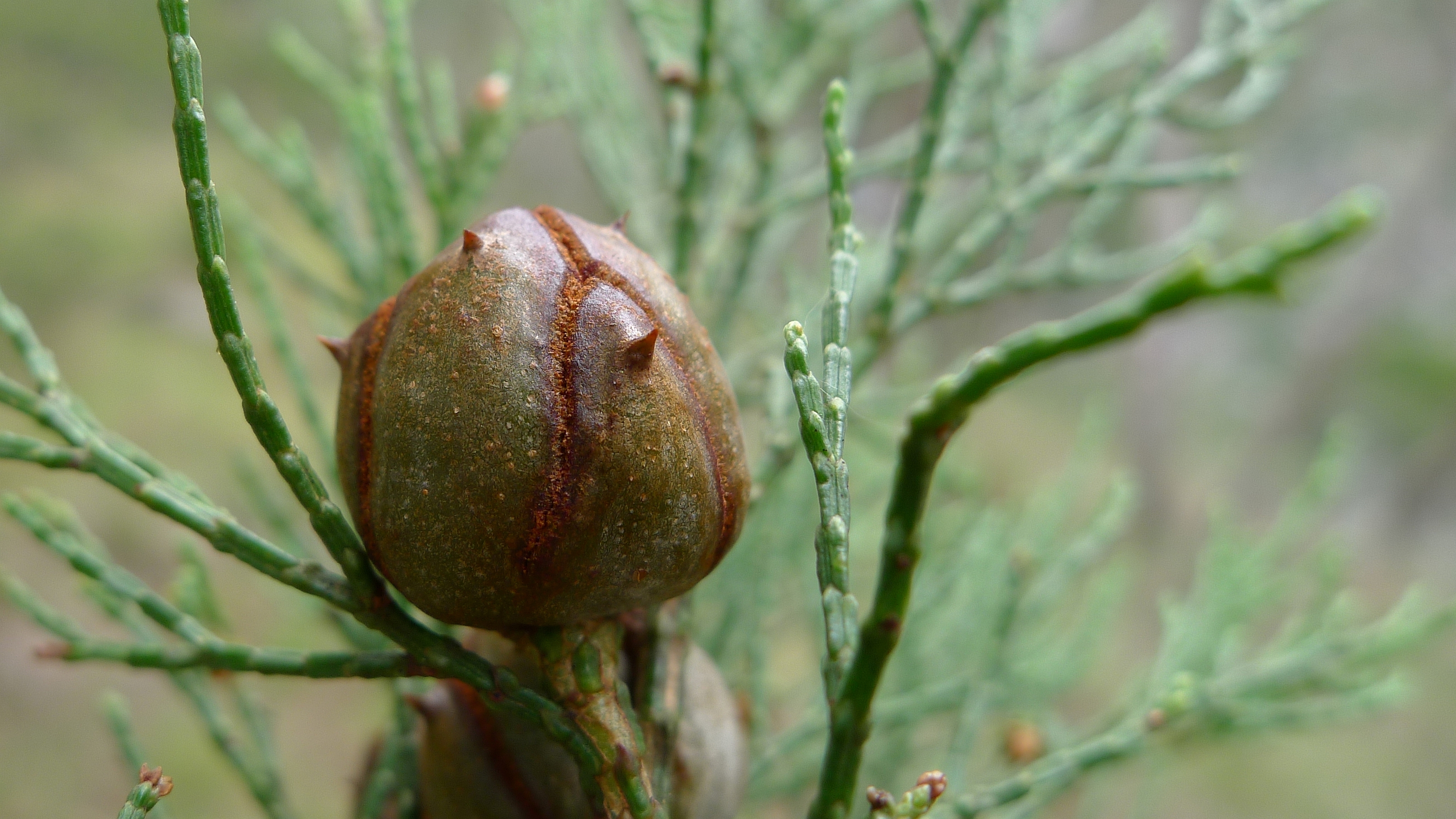
Cone and foliage of Callitris endlicheri

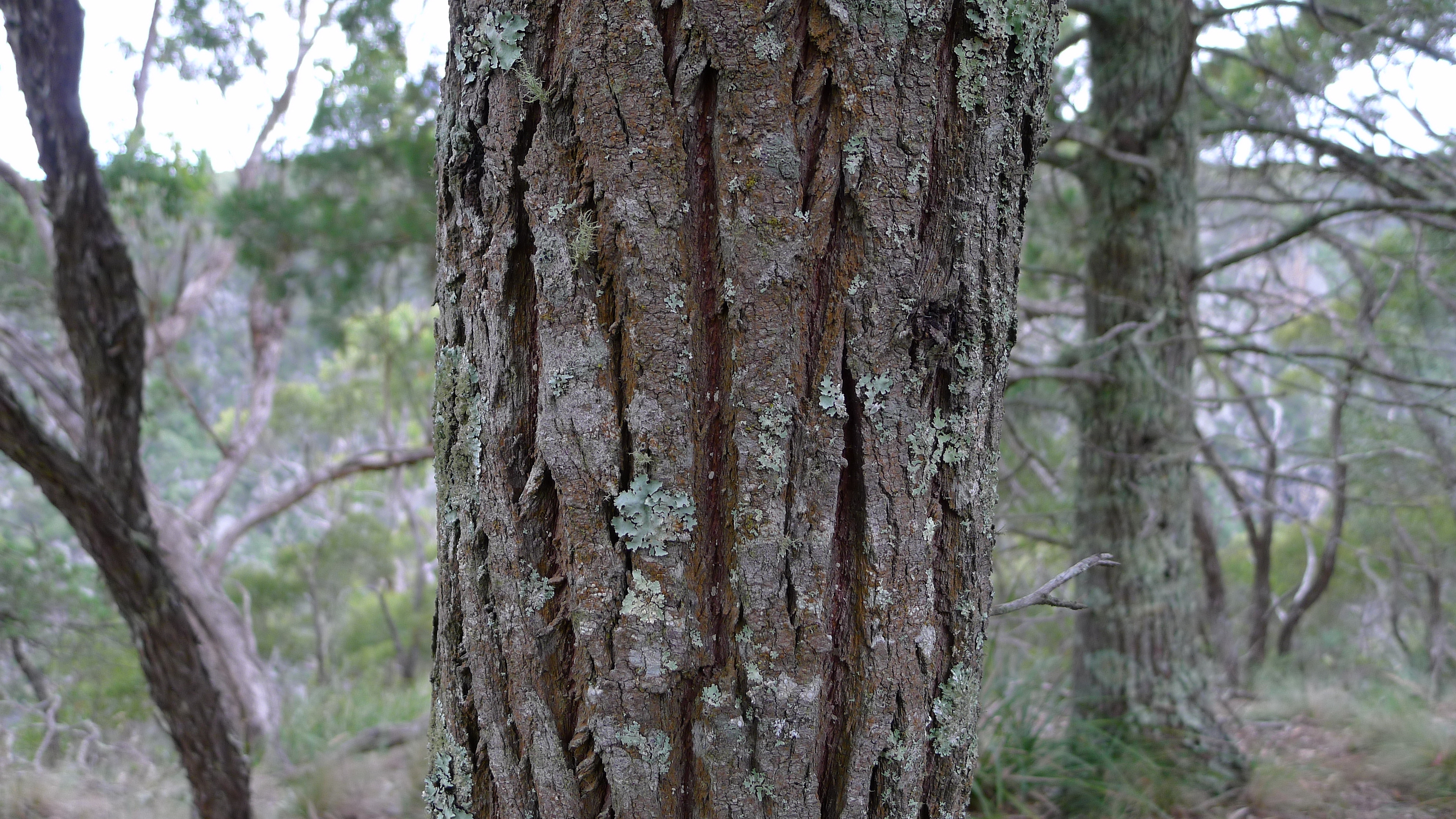
Bark of C. endlicheri trunk

== See also ==
- Pine Island Reserve
