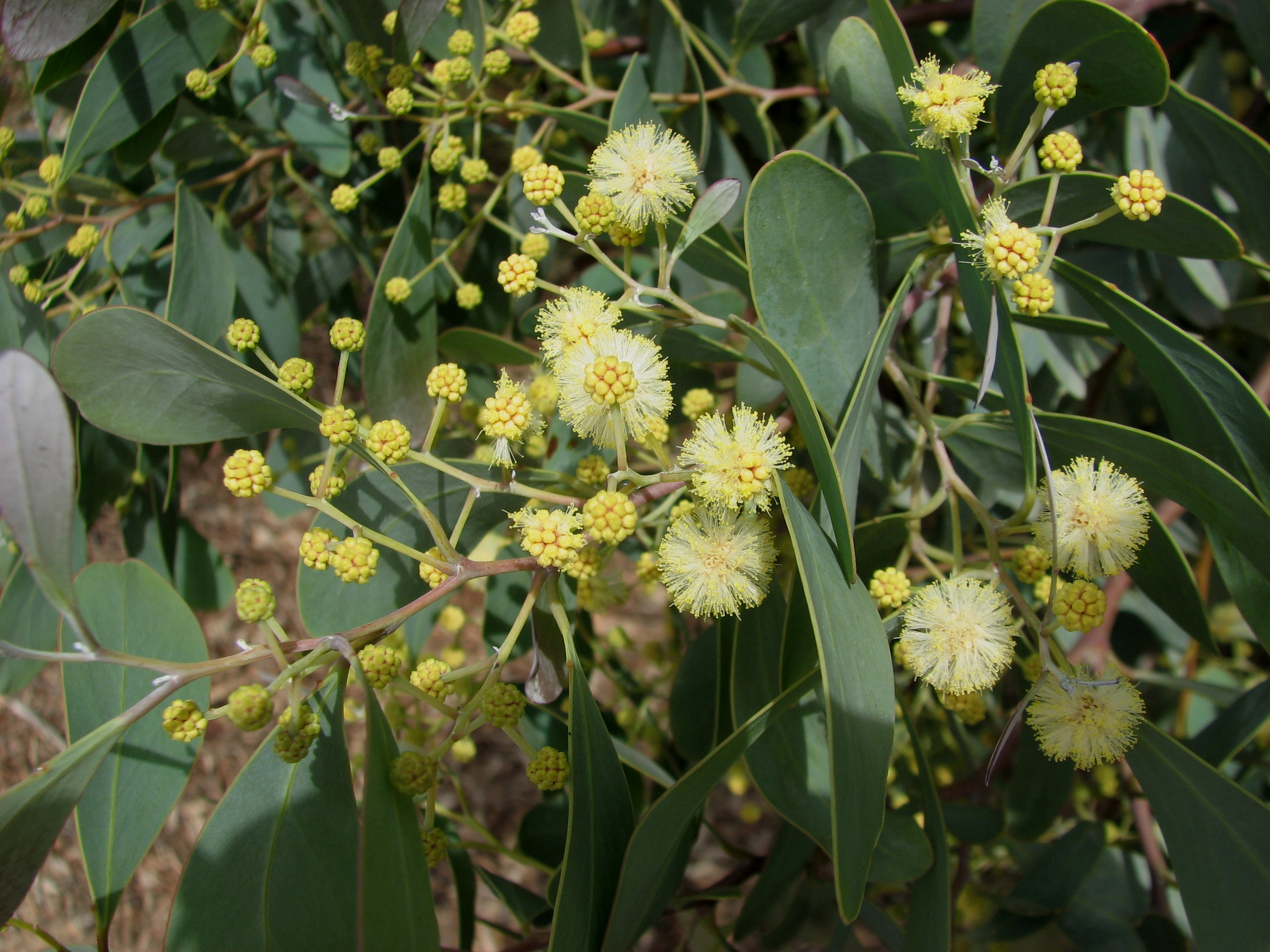

Conservation status
- Vulnerable (EPBC Act)

Scientific classification
- Kingdom: Plantae
- Clade: Tracheophytes
- Clade: Angiosperms
- Clade: Eudicots
- Clade: Rosids
- Order: Fabales
- Family: Fabaceae
- Subfamily: Caesalpinioideae
- Clade: Mimosoid clade
- Genus: Acacia
- Species: A. caerulescens

Binomial name
- Acacia caerulescens Maslin & Court
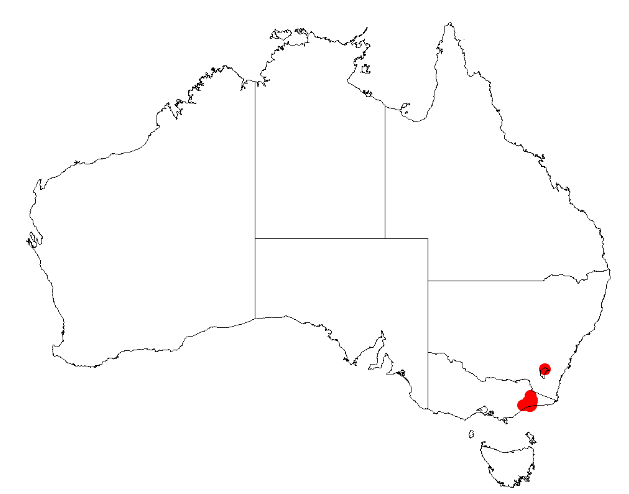
- Occurrence data from AVH

Synonyms
- Racosperma caerulescens (Maslin & Court) Pedley

= Acacia caerulescens =

Limestone blue wattle

Species of legume

Acacia caerulescens, commonly known as limestone blue wattle, Buchan blue or Buchan blue wattle is a species of flowering plant in the family Fabaceae and is endemic to Victoria, Australia. It is a tree or tall shrub with mostly egg-shaped to lance-shaped phyllodes with the narrower end towards the base, spherical heads of lemon yellow flowers in racemes or panicles, and papery pods covered with a whitish bloom.

== Description ==
Acacia caerulescens is a tree or large shrub that typically grows a height of 10–15 m (33–49 ft) and has a pyramidal habit with glabrous branchlets with a fine, white powdery coating. Its phyllodes are egg-shaped to lance-shaped with the narrower end towards the base or sometimes elliptic or narrowly elliptic shaped, 40–80 mm (1.6–3.1 in) long and 15–30 mm (0.59–1.18 in) wide. The flowers are borne in spherical heads in racemes or panicles on a rachis 10–30 mm (0.39–1.18 in) long. The heads have mostly twenty to thirty lemon-yellow flowers. Flowering occurs from November to December and the pods are papery, glabrous, and stalked, 50–120 mm (2.0–4.7 in) long and 14–22 mm (0.55–0.87 in) wide with dull black, elliptic seeds 5–6 mm (0.20–0.24 in) long.

== Taxonomy ==
Acacia caerulescens was formally described in 1989 by Bruce Maslin and Arthur Bertram Court based on plant material collected by Court about 4.3 km (2.7 mi) north of Buchan in Gippsland.

== Distribution and habitat ==
Buchan blue wattle grows in the Lakes Entrance and Buchan areas where it is only known from remnant populations in clay over limestone.

== Conservation status ==
Acacia caerulescens is listed as "vulnerable" under the Australian Government Environment Protection and Biodiversity Conservation Act 1999 and as "endangered" under the Victorian Government Flora and Fauna Guarantee Act 1988.

== See also ==
- List of Acacia species
