= Pine Island Reserve =

Nature reserve in Canberra, Australia

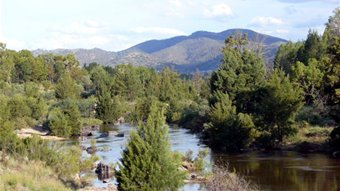
- Interactive map of Pine Island Reserve
- Location: Tuggeranong, Australian Capital Territory
- Nearest city: Canberra
- Coordinates: 35°25′59″S 149°04′12″E
- Created: 20 May 1980

Pine Island Reserve, a reserve containing a small plantation of pine trees, is located on the Murrumbidgee River where the river flows through the Tuggeranong district of Canberra, in the Australian Capital Territory, Australia. The closest suburb to the reserve and river island is Greenway.

Pine Island is usually accessible by land and only becomes an island in time of peak flows in the Murrumbidgee River. The island is named for the Callitris endlicheri, or black cypress pines, that grow locally.

This region was first explored by Europeans in 1820 by Charles Throsby. Throsby was looking for a suitable water source. He came across the Murrumbidgee River near Pine Island in April 1821.

Facilities at the reserve include an area for picnicking, barbecues, potable water, and toilets. On the river, recreational pursuits during the warmer months include swimming, fishing, and kayaking. The area is also known for birdwatching. There is a bushwalking path called the Murrumbidgee Discovery Trail that runs south to Point Hut crossing and north to Kambah Pools through the Bullen Range Nature Reserve. Dogs are not permitted in the reserve.
