= List of Major Vegetation Groups in Australia =

This is a list of Major Vegetations Groups and Subgroups in Australia. Major Vegetation Groups and Major Vegetation Subgroups are categories used by the Department of the Environment and Energy as part of its National Vegetation Information System.

The Major Vegetation Groups are broadly defined as representative of distinct vegetative environments; they may extend over large areas and often contain more than one vegetation association or community. They were originally defined as part of the National Vegetation Information System framework for the Australian Native Vegetation Assessment 2001. As of 2022, the most recent update was version 6.0, in 2020.

== Major Vegetation Groups ==
In version 6.0 there are 33 Major Vegetation Groups, including some groups representing absence of knowledge or absence of vegetation:

- Rainforests and Vine Thickets
- Eucalypt Tall Open Forests
- Eucalypt Open Forests
- Eucalypt Low Open Forests
- Eucalypt Woodlands
- Acacia Forests and Woodlands
- Callitris Forests and Woodlands
- Casuarina Forests and Woodlands
- Melaleuca Forests and Woodlands
- Other Forests and Woodlands
- Eucalypt Open Woodlands
- Tropical Eucalypt Woodlands/Grasslands
- Acacia Open Woodlands
- Mallee Woodlands and Shrublands
- Low Closed Forests and Tall Closed Shrublands
- Acacia Shrublands
- Other Shrublands
- Heathlands
- Tussock Grasslands
- Hummock Grasslands
- Other Grasslands, Herblands, Sedgelands and Rushlands
- Chenopod Shrublands, Samphire Shrublands and Forblands
- Mangroves
- Inland Aquatic - freshwater, salt lakes, lagoons
- Cleared, non-native vegetation, buildings
- Unclassified native vegetation
- Naturally bare - sand, rock, claypan, mudflat
- Sea and estuaries
- Regrowth, modified native vegetation
- Unclassified forest
- Other Open Woodlands
- Mallee Open Woodlands and Sparse Mallee Shrublands
- Unknown data

== Major Vegetation Subgroups ==
The Major Vegetation Subgroups were defined for the purposes of finer scale mapping and regional analyses.

Version 6.0 contains 85 subgroups. In version 3.1 (approximately 2007), the Major Vegetation Subgroups were:

- Cool temperate rainforest
- Tropical or sub-tropical rainforest
- Eucalyptus tall open forest with a dense broad-leaved understorey (wet sclerophyll)
- Eucalyptus open forests with a shrubby understorey
- Eucalyptus open forests with a grassy understorey
- Tropical Eucalyptus forest and woodlands with a tall annual grassy understorey
- Eucalyptus woodlands with a shrubby understorey
- Eucalyptus woodlands with a grassy understorey
- Tropical mixed spp forests and woodlands
- Callitris forests and woodlands
- Brigalow (Acacia harpophylla) forests and woodlands
- Other Acacia forests and woodlands
- Melaleuca open forests and woodlands
- Other forests and woodlands
- Boulders/rock with algae, lichen or scattered plants, or alpine fjaeldmarks
- Eucalyptus low open woodlands with hummock grass
- Eucalyptus low open woodlands with tussock grass
- Mulga (Acacia aneura) woodlands with tussock grass
- Other Acacia tall open shrublands and shrublands
- Arid and semi-arid acacia low open woodlands and shrublands with chenopods
- Arid and semi-arid acacia low open woodlands and shrublands with hummock grass
- Arid and semi-arid acacia low open woodlands and shrublands with tussock grass
- Casuarina and Allocasuarina forests and woodlands
- Mallee with hummock grass
- Low closed forest or tall closed shrublands (including Acacia, Melaleuca and Banksia)
- Mallee with a dense shrubby understorey
- Heath
- Saltbush and Bluebush shrublands
- Other shrublands
- Hummock grasslands
- Mitchell grass (Astrebla) tussock grasslands
- Blue grass (Dicanthium) and tall bunch grass (Chrysopogon) tussock grasslands
- Temperate tussock grasslands
- Other tussock grasslands
- Wet tussock grassland with herbs, sedges or rushes, herblands or ferns
- Mixed chenopod, samphire +/- forbs
- Mangroves
- Saline or brackish sedgelands or grasslands
- Naturally bare, sand, rock, claypan, mudflat
- Salt lakes and lagoons
- Freshwater, dams, lakes, lagoons or aquatic plants
- Sea, estuaries (includes seagrass)
- Eucalyptus open woodlands with shrubby understorey
- Eucalyptus open woodlands with a grassy understorey
- Melaleuca shrublands and open shrublands
- Banksia woodlands
- Mulga (Acacia aneura) woodlands and shrublands with hummock grass
- Allocasuarina woodland and open woodland with hummock grass
- Eucalyptus low open woodlands with a shrubby understorey
- Eucalyptus tall open forest with a fine-leaved shrubby understorey
- Mallee with an open shrubby understorey
- Eucalyptus low open woodlands with a chenopod or samphire understorey
- Lignum shrublands and wetlands
- Leptospermum forests
- Eucalyptus woodlands with ferns, herbs, sedges, rushes or wet tussock grassland
- Eucalyptus tall open forests and open forests with ferns, herbs, sedges, rushes or wet tussock grasses
- Mallee with a tussock grass understorey
- Dry rainforest or vine thickets
- Sedgelands, rushes or reeds
- Other grasslands
- Regrowth or modified forests and woodlands
- Regrowth or modified shrublands
- Regrowth or modified graminoids
- Regrowth or modified chenopod shrublands, samphire or forblands
- Unclassified native vegetation
- Cleared, non-native vegetation, buildings
- Unknown/No data
