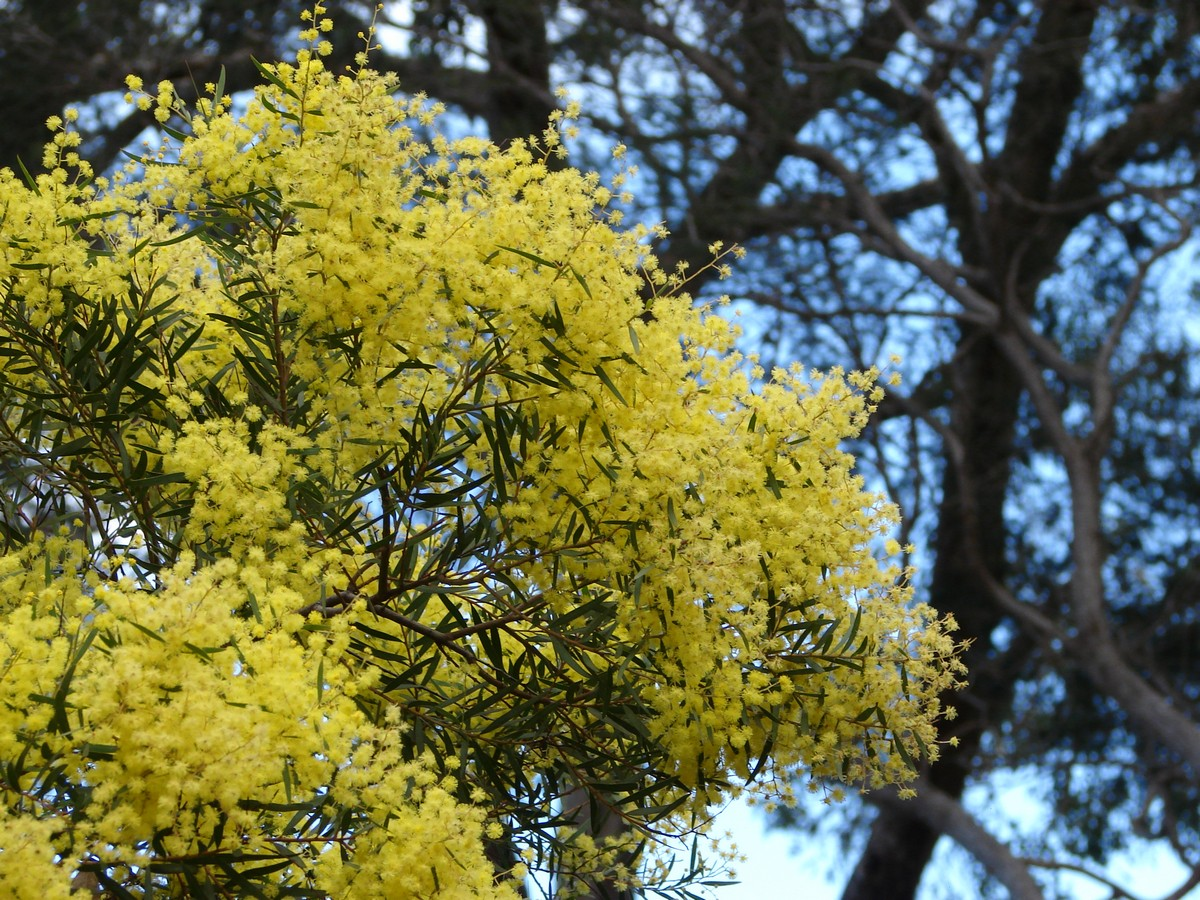

Scientific classification
- Kingdom: Plantae
- Clade: Embryophytes
- Clade: Tracheophytes
- Clade: Angiosperms
- Clade: Eudicots
- Clade: Rosids
- Order: Fabales
- Family: Fabaceae
- Subfamily: Caesalpinioideae
- Clade: Mimosoid clade
- Genus: Acacia
- Species: A. prominens

Binomial name
- Acacia prominens A.Cunn. ex G.Don
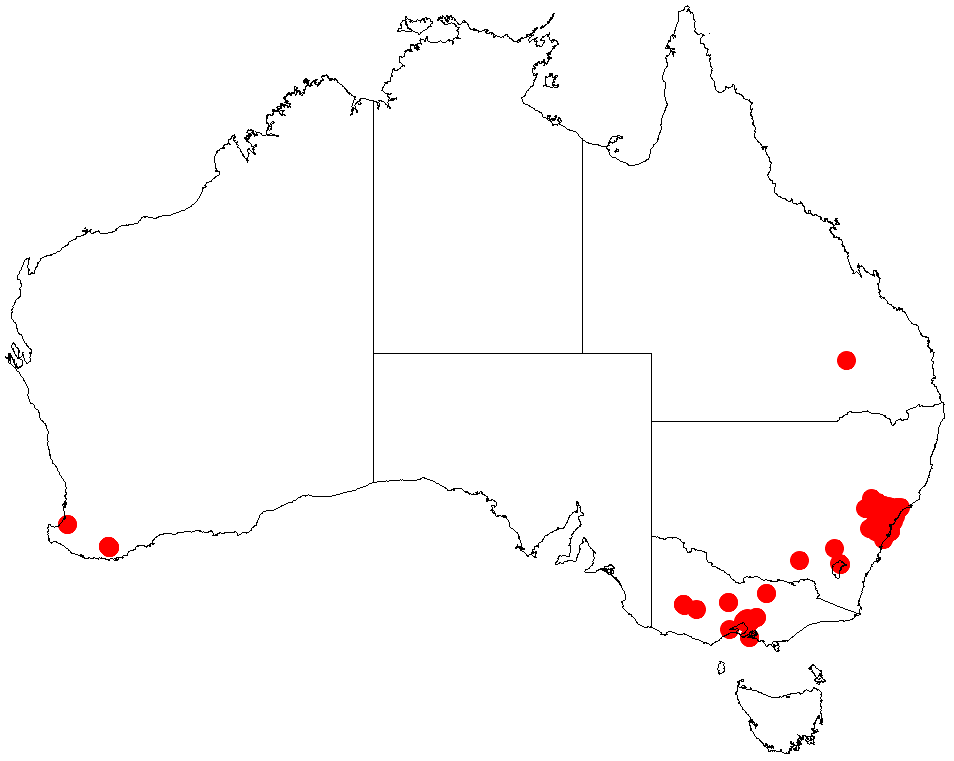
- Occurrence data from AVH

Synonyms
- Acacia praetervisa Domin; Racosperma prominens (A.Cunn. ex G.Don) Pedley

= Acacia prominens =

Golden rain wattle

Species of legume

Acacia prominens (golden rain wattle, goldenrain wattle, Gosford wattle or grey sally) is a shrub or tree in the genus Acacia native to New South Wales, Australia.

== Description ==
Acacia prominens usually grows to a height of 5 to 9 m (16 to 30 ft), sometimes to a height of 20 to 25 m (66 to 82 ft). It has glabrous branchlets that are angled at the extremeties and has smooth grey coloured bark. Like most species of Acacia it has phyllodes rather than true leaves. The grey-green to grey-blue, glabrous to sparsely hairy phyllodes have a narrowly elliptic to narrowly oblong-elliptic shape and are more or less straight. The phyllodes are 2.5 to 6 cm (0.98 to 2.36 in) in length and 5 to 12 mm (0.20 to 0.47 in) wide with a prominent midvein. It blooms between July and September producing inflorescences in groups of 5 to 25 in an axillary raceme with spherical flower-heads that have a diameter of 3 to 5 mm (0.12 to 0.20 in) containing 8 to 15 lemon yellow to pale yellow coloured flowers.

== Taxonomy ==
The species was first formally described by the botanist Allan Cunningham in 1832 as part of George Dons work A General History of Dichlamydeous Plants. It was reclassified as Racosperma prominens by Leslie Pedley in 2003 then transferred back to genus Acacia in 2006. The species epithet refers to the prominent exerted gland on the margin of the phyllode, about 5 to 20 mm (0.20 to 0.79 in) above the pulvinus. It is most closely related to A. kettlewelliae and A. covenyi.

== Distribution ==
It is endemic to southeastern Australia in New South Wales and also found in Victoria. In New South Wales, it is found from around the Hunter Valley in the north west to the Gosford and Sydney areas in the south east. It is often situated in damp and sheltered areas growing in loamy and clay soils along the margins of rainforest or as a part of wet sclerophyll forest communities. It is naturalised to parts of central Victoria including the goldfields, greater Grampians, Gippsland Plain and northern inland slopes.

== Alkaloids ==
It contains the psychoactive alkaloids phenethylamine and β-methylphenethylamine.

== Image gallery ==
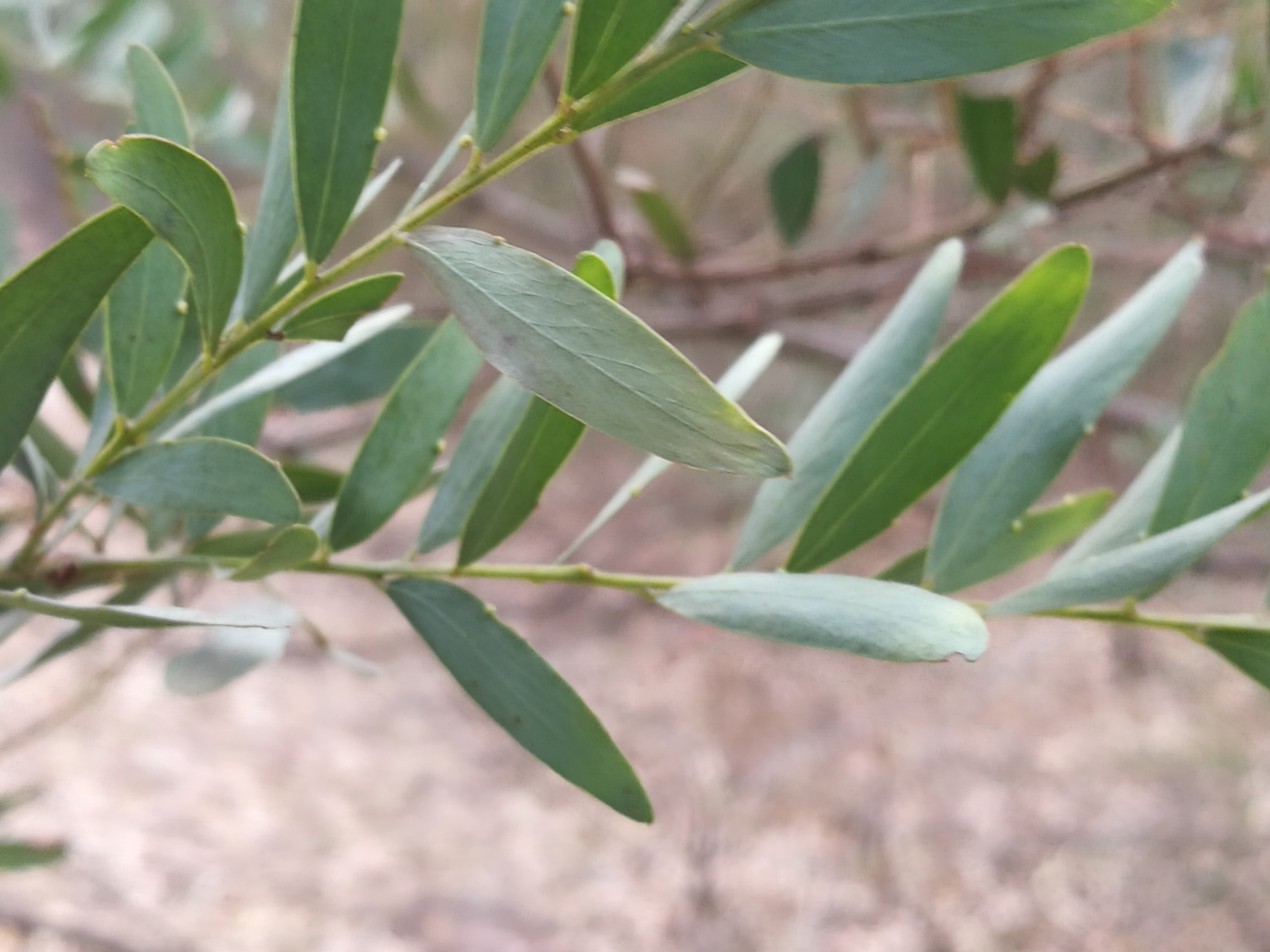
Phyllodes with prominent glands on margins

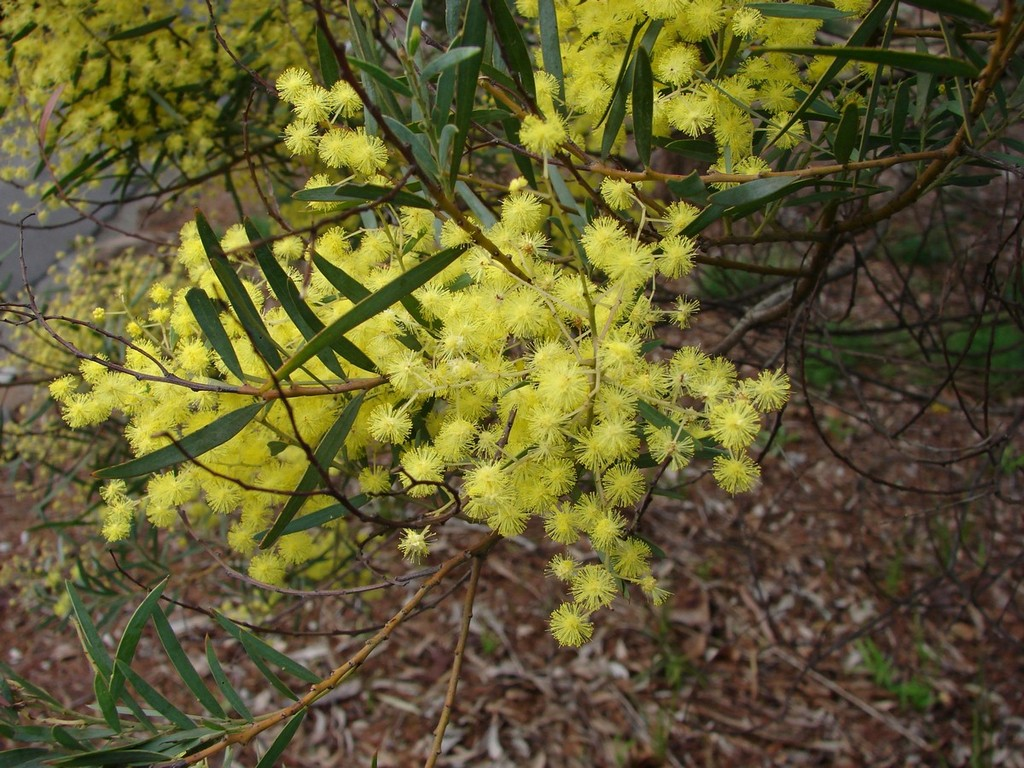

== See also ==
- List of Acacia species
