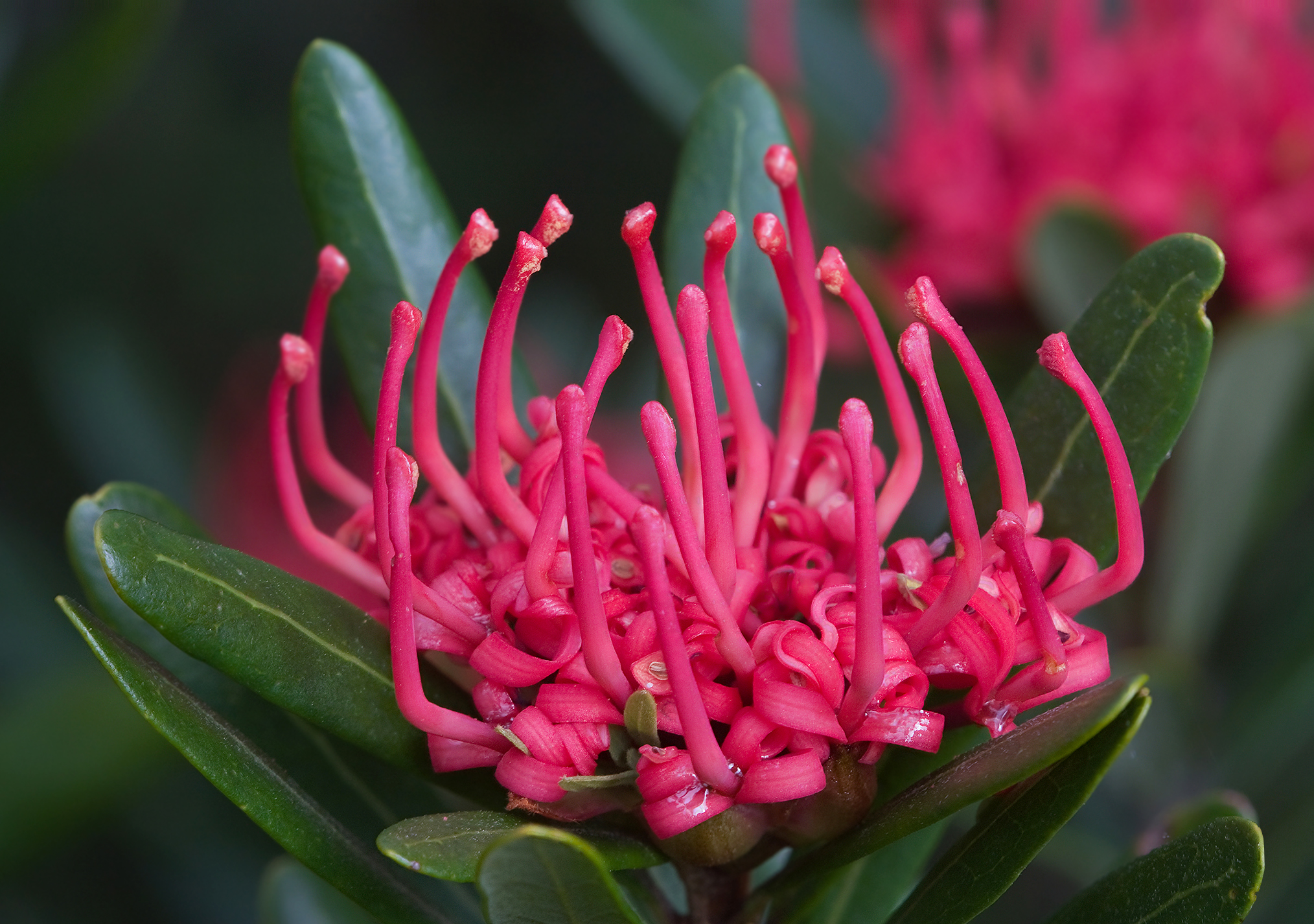

Scientific classification
- Kingdom: Plantae
- Clade: Embryophytes
- Clade: Tracheophytes
- Clade: Angiosperms
- Clade: Eudicots
- Order: Proteales
- Family: Proteaceae
- Genus: Telopea
- Species: T. truncata

Binomial name
- Telopea truncata (Labill.) R.Br.
- Distribution of Tasmanian waratah

Synonyms
- Embothrium truncatum Labill.; Hylogyne australis Salisb. ex Knight nom. illeg.; Hylogyne truncata (Labill.) Kuntze; Telopea tasmaniana James Ross

= Telopea truncata =

Species of shrub endemic to Tasmania, Australia

Telopea truncata, commonly known as the Tasmanian waratah, is a plant in the family Proteaceae. It is endemic to Tasmania where it is found on moist acidic soils at altitudes of 600 to 1200 m (2000–4000 ft). Telopea truncata is a component of alpine eucalypt forest, rainforest and scrub communities. It grows as a multistemmed shrub to a height of 3 metres (10 ft), or occasionally as a small tree to 10 m (35 ft) high, with red flower heads, known as inflorescences, appearing over the Tasmanian summer (November to February) and bearing 10 to 35 individual flowers. Yellow-flowered forms are occasionally seen, but do not form a population distinct from the rest of the species.

Collected by French botanist Jacques Labillardière in 1792–93, Telopea truncata was first scientifically described in 1805. Genetic analysis revealed that the Tasmanian waratah is the most distinctive of the five waratah species. It can be cultivated in temperate climates, requiring soils with good drainage and ample moisture in part-shaded or sunny positions. Several commercially available cultivars that are hybrids of T. truncata with the New South Wales waratah (T. speciosissima) and Gippsland waratah (T. oreades) have been developed.

== Description ==
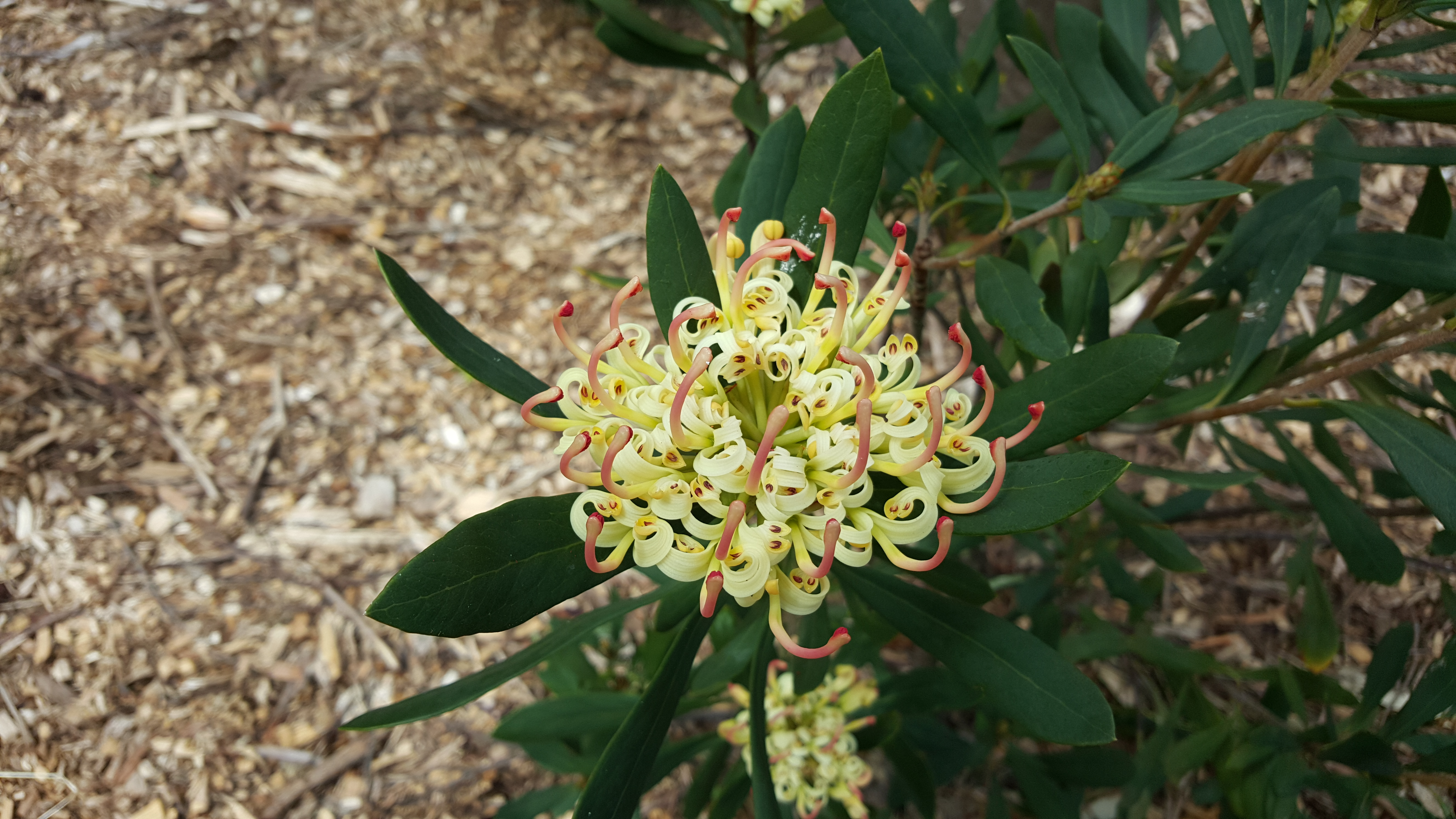
Yellow-flowered form in cultivation, Hobart

The Tasmanian waratah is a large erect shrub up to 3 metres (10 ft) in height with several stems, although it sometimes grows as a single-stemmed tree to 10 m (35 ft) high. Unlike the New South Wales waratah (T. speciosissima), which has a few stems topped with flowers, the stems of the Tasmanian waratah branch freely, with numerous smaller branches topped with flower heads. Younger branches and flower heads frequently have a coating of brownish hairs. The narrow adult leaves are 3–14 cm (1 1/8–5 1/2 in) long and 0.5–2.2 cm (1/4–7/8 in) across and have a rough texture. Spathulate (spoon-shaped) to obovate in shape, they have smooth, slightly down-curved margins. The undersurface of the leaves is hairy. Occasional lobed leaves are seen.

Flowering occurs from October to January, and is related to altitude: plants at lower elevations flower earlier than ones higher up. The flower heads, known as inflorescences, are terminal—that is, they arise on the ends of small branches—and are surrounded by small inconspicuous hairy bracts. This sets T. truncata apart from all other waratah species, which have hairless bracts. In the shape of a flattened raceme, the flower heads are 3.5–6 cm (1 3/8–2 3/8 in) in diameter and composed of 10 to 35 individual flowers. They are most commonly bright red, though scattered yellow-flowered plants occur. These were described as forma lutea but are mere colour variations and not genetically distinct. Yellow-flowered plants have both red- and yellow-flowered progeny. Anthesis is basipetal; that is, the flowers at the base (edges) of the flower head open first. The flower is composed of a 2 cm-long perianth on a 1 cm-long stalk, with a pronounced kink in the style above the ovary; all other waratah species have gently incurving styles. Anatomically, the individual flower bears a sessile anther (that is, it lacks a filament), which lies next to the stigma at the end of the style. The ovary lies at the base of the style and atop a stalk known as the gynophore, and it is from here that the seed pod then develops. Meanwhile, a crescent-shaped nectary lies at the base of the gynophore.

After flowering, the curved leathery to woody follicles develop. Hanging downwards on wooden stalks, these are roughly oblong in shape, and measure around 5 cm (2 in) long. They split longitudinally to release the winged seeds, which are ripe around March. There are around 16 seeds, which are arranged in two rows. Wooden structures known as lamellae separate the seeds from each other and the follicle walls.

== Taxonomy and evolution ==
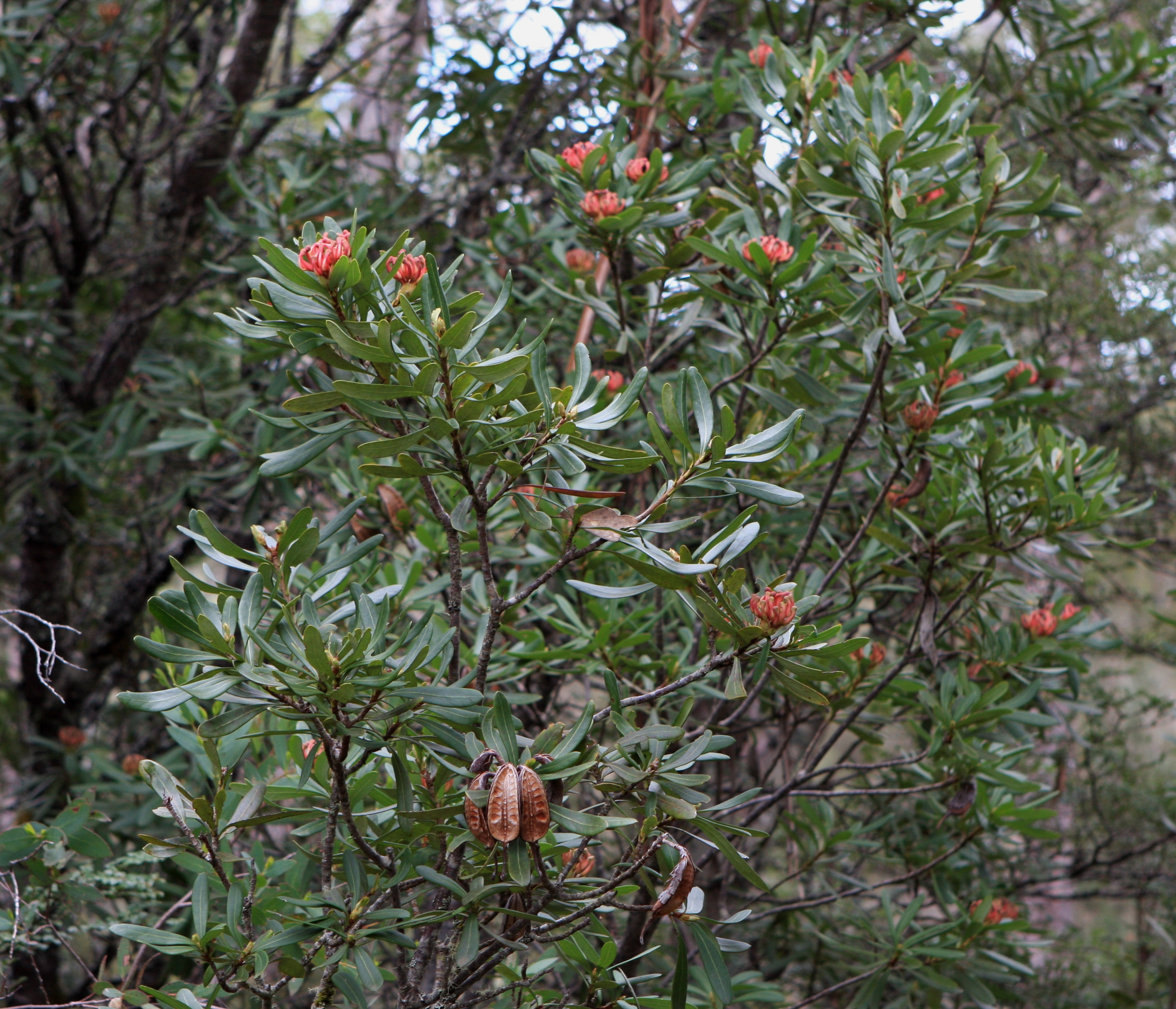
Plant with developing buds and a previous year's old seed pod

While exploring Van Diemen's Land (Tasmania) in 1792–93, French botanist Jacques Labillardière collected specimens of what he later formally described as Embothrium truncatum in his 1805 work Novae Hollandiae Plantarum Specimen. The specific epithet is the Latin adjective truncatus, meaning "truncated" or "ending abruptly", referring to the end of the seed wing. This characteristic is not specific to the Tasmanian waratah; all members of the subtribe Embothriinae have truncate seed wings. Embothrium was a wastebasket taxon at the time, and Robert Brown proposed placing the species in a new genus, Telopea, in a talk he gave in 1809, publishing the new name Telopea truncata in 1810. Richard Salisbury had attended the talk and controversially published the species as Hylogyne australis, or southern hylogyne, in Joseph Knight's 1809 book On the cultivation of the plants belonging to the natural order of Proteeae, thus claiming precedence over Brown's formal 1810 description. Salisbury was involved in disputes with several prominent naturalists of the time, and his preemption of Brown was seen as unethical, so his names were largely ignored by his contemporaries in favor of Brown's.

James Ross described a new species of waratah, Telopea tasmaniana, in his Hobart Town Almanack in 1835, but it is now considered a synonym of T. truncata. In 1891, German botanist Otto Kuntze published Revisio generum plantarum, his response to what he perceived as a lack of method in existing nomenclatural practice. He revived the genus Hylogyne on the grounds of priority, and correctly made the new combination Hylogyne truncata for T. truncata. However, Kuntze's revisionary program was not accepted by the majority of botanists. Ultimately, the genus Telopea was nomenclaturally conserved over Hylogyne by the International Botanical Congress of 1905.

Telopea truncata is one, and possibly the most distinctive, of five species from southeastern Australia which make up the genus Telopea. It is the earliest offshoot of a lineage that gives rise to the Gippsland waratah (T. oreades) and Monga waratah (T. mongaensis) of southeastern mainland Australia. The perianths of T. truncata are of a single shade of red, whereas those of its mainland relatives are coloured with two distinct shades of red—the surfaces facing the centre of the flower head are a much brighter red than those facing away.

The genus is classified in the subtribe Embothriinae of the Proteaceae, along with the tree waratahs (Alloxylon) from eastern Australia and New Caledonia, and the South American genera Oreocallis and Embothrium. Almost all of these species have red terminal flowers, and hence the subtribe's origin and floral appearance most likely pre-dated the splitting of Gondwana into Australia, Antarctica, and South America over 60 million years ago. Propylipollis ambiguus (formerly Triporopollenites ambiguus) is the oldest identifiable member of the Embothriinae. It is known only from pollen deposits, and was originally described from Eocene deposits in Victoria. The fossil pollen closely resembles that of T. truncata, Alloxylon pinnatum and Oreocallis grandiflora. Fossil remains of Telopea truncata have been recovered from early to middle Pleistocene strata at Regatta Point in western Tasmania. The leaves are small, and these beds housed a subalpine plant community in what is now lowland terrain. Leaves identical to (and classified as) Telopea truncata have been recovered from early Oligocene deposits around Lake Cethana near Sheffield.

== Distribution and habitat ==
The species is found in central, southern, and western Tasmania and is absent from warmer, dryer areas. It grows on moist acidic soils in wet sclerophyll forest or subalpine scrub at altitudes of 600 to 1200 m (2000–4000 ft). It is an understory component of subalpine forest stands of alpine ash (Eucalyptus delegatensis) and alpine yellow gum (E. subcrenulata), as well as Athrotaxis selaginoides–Nothofagus gunnii short rainforest, Athrotaxis selaginoides rainforest, Leptospermum-with-rainforest scrub, the tall Nothofagus–Atherosperma rainforest and Nothofagus–Phyllocladus short rainforest. It is occasionally found in the Leptospermum scoparium–Acacia mucronata forest community of western Tasmania.

== Ecology ==
The prominent position and striking colour of the flowers of T. truncata and many of its relatives within the subtribe Embothriinae in both Australia and South America strongly suggest it is adapted to pollination by birds, and has been for over 60 million years. The flower heads produce abundant nectar, which is fed upon by many bird species. The Tasmanian waratah has a swollen woody base largely under the soil known as a lignotuber, which stores energy and nutrients as a resource for rapid growth after a bushfire.

Like most Proteaceae, T. truncata has fine proteoid roots that arise from larger roots. These are roots with dense clusters of short lateral rootlets that form a mat in the soil just below the leaf litter. They are particularly efficient at absorbing nutrients from nutrient-poor soils, including the phosphorus-deficient native soils of Australia. Waratah seeds are often eaten—and destroyed—by animals and do not travel far (just several metres) from the parent plants.

== Cultivation ==
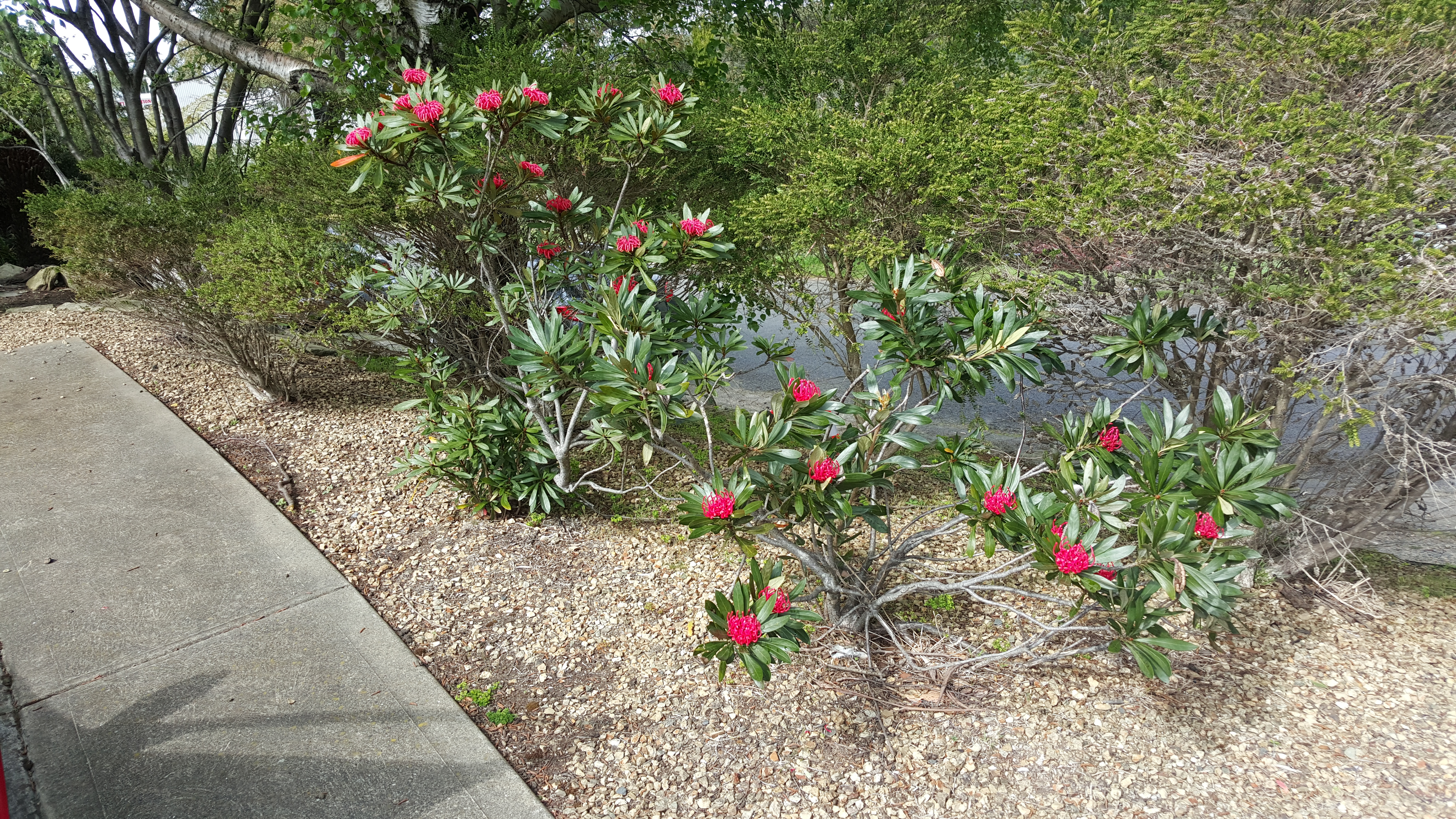
Two plants in cultivation in a Hobart car park

The flowers of the Tasmanian waratah provide ample nectar and hence are a food source for bird visitors to the garden. The species can be propagated by seed, though seedlings may succumb to damping off. Growing in a natural shady location delays flowering by two to four weeks, while growing in a cooler conditions (due either to latitude or altitude) can delay flowering by up to six weeks. Pruning flower heads can promote subsequent growth of leaves and branches. It grows best in a cool climate with ample water and good drainage, and has done well in cultivation in England. The Royal Horticultural Society gave it an Award of Merit in 1934 and a First Class Certificate in 1938. The relationship between light duration and intensity, temperature, vegetative growth and flower production is poorly known. Yellow forms in cultivation were originally propagated from a plant found on Mount Wellington.

=== Cultivars ===
- Telopea 'Champagne' is a cultivar registered under plant breeders' rights (PBR) in 2006. Its creamy-yellow flowerheads appear from October to December. It is a three-way hybrid between T. speciosissima, T. oreades and the yellow-flowered form of T. truncata.
- Telopea 'Golden Globe' is a cultivar registered under PBR in 2006. Larger than 'Champagne', it is also a three-way hybrid between T. speciosissima, T. oreades and the yellow-flowered form of T. truncata. It has been propagated and sold as 'Shady Lady Yellow'. It was originally bred in the Dandenongs east of Melbourne.

== Uses ==
The flowers of T. truncata were once used extensively for decoration. Geoffrey Smith observed in 1909 that the collection of the flowers for this purpose had caused the decline of some populations on Mount Wellington. The timber of larger specimens has been used for inlays; it has an attractive grain and a pale red color.
