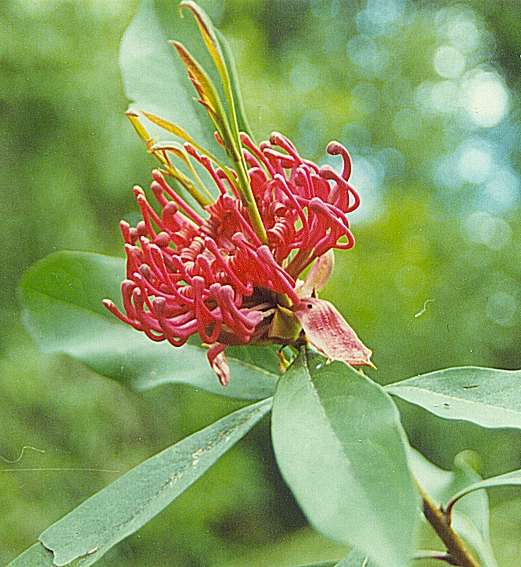

Scientific classification
- Kingdom: Plantae
- Clade: Tracheophytes
- Clade: Angiosperms
- Clade: Eudicots
- Order: Proteales
- Family: Proteaceae
- Genus: Telopea
- Species: T. oreades

Binomial name
- Telopea oreades F.Muell., 1861
- Range in southeastern Australia (in red)

Synonyms
- Hylogyne oreades (F.Muell.) Kuntze

= Telopea oreades =

Gippsland waratah

Species of plant native to southeastern Australia

Telopea oreades, commonly known as the Gippsland-, mountain- or Victorian waratah, is a large shrub or small tree in the family Proteaceae. Native to southeastern Australia, it is found in wet sclerophyll forest and rainforest on rich acidic soils high in organic matter. No subspecies are recognised, though a northern isolated population hybridises extensively with the Braidwood waratah (T. mongaensis). Reaching a height of up to 19 metres (62 feet), T. oreades grows with a single trunk and erect habit. It has dark green leaves with prominent veins that are 11–28 centimetres (4.3–11 in) long and 1.5–6 cm (0.6–2.4 in) wide. The red flower heads, known as inflorescences, appear in late spring. Each is composed of up to 60 individual flowers.

In the garden, T. oreades grows in soils with good drainage and ample moisture in part-shaded or sunny positions. Several commercially available cultivars that are hybrid forms with T. speciosissima have been developed, such as the 'Shady Lady' series. The timber is hard and has been used for making furniture and tool handles.

== Description ==
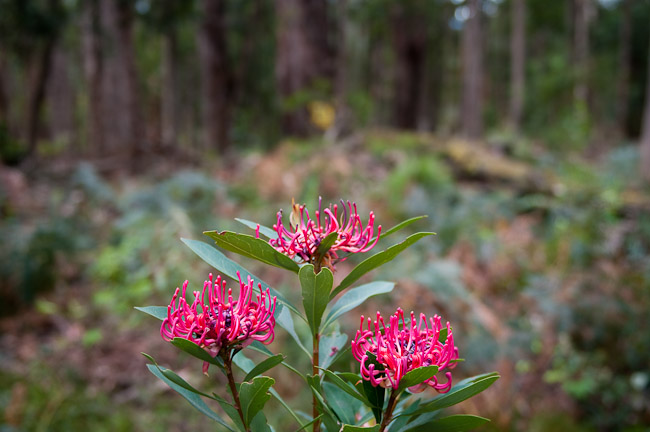
Flowering plant in Errinundra National Park

Telopea oreades grows as a large shrub or narrow tree 9–19 m (30–62 ft) high with a trunk reaching 45 to 60 cm (18 to 24 in) in diameter. Greyish brown, the trunk is thin in relation to the tree's height and not buttressed. Its surface is smooth with horizontal lenticels and warty protuberances. Smaller branches are more brown and smooth. Young plants have a much more erect habit than other members of the genus Telopea and their stems have a distinct reddish tinge. The shiny dark green leaves are arranged alternately along the stems. The leaves are narrow-obovate to spathulate, and measure 11–28 centimetres (4.3–11 in) long and 1.5–6 cm (0.59–2.36 in) wide. They have a sunken midrib on the upperside (and corresponding ridge on the underside) with four to six pairs of lateral veins visible at a 45 degree angle to the midline. They veer and converge to form an easily seen vein that runs around 0.5 cm (0.20 in) inside the leaf margin. The undersurface is paler and greyer. When dried, the leaves appear to have a granular texture.

Flowering occurs between October and December in its native range, with plants at higher elevations flowering later than ones at lower altitude. The crimson flowerheads are about 9 cm (3.5 in) in diameter. They are composed of 36 to 60 individual flowers with green to pink bracts, which may be up to 3 cm (1.2 in) long. Each flower is encased in a 2.5 cm (0.98 in) long perianth, which is a much brighter red on the surface facing the centre of the flower than the surface facing outwards. Anthesis, or the opening of the flowers, begins with those at the centre of the flowerhead and moves to the edges or base. The individual flower bears a sessile anther (that is, it lacks a filament), which lies next to the stigma at the end of the style. The ovary lies at the base of the style and atop a stalk known as the gynophore, and it is from here that the seed pods then develop. Meanwhile, a crescent-shaped nectary lies at the base of the gynophore.

After flowering, the curved leathery to woody follicles develop; these are 5 to 7.5 cm (2.0 to 3.0 in) long, which somewhat resemble a boat in shape. These ripen the following May to September, and split open to reveal (and spill) 10–16 seeds. Arranged in two columns, the winged, flat brown seeds are around 1 cm (0.39 in) long with a roughly rectangular wing 3.5–4 cm (1.4–1.6 in) long. New shoots often grow through flowerheads.

It can be difficult to distinguish T. oreades from T. mongaensis though the leaves of the latter species are more prominently veined, and mostly (but not always) narrower than 2 cm (0.79 in) wide. Telopea oreades flowers around a month earlier than T. mongaensis in areas where both are present.

== Taxonomy ==
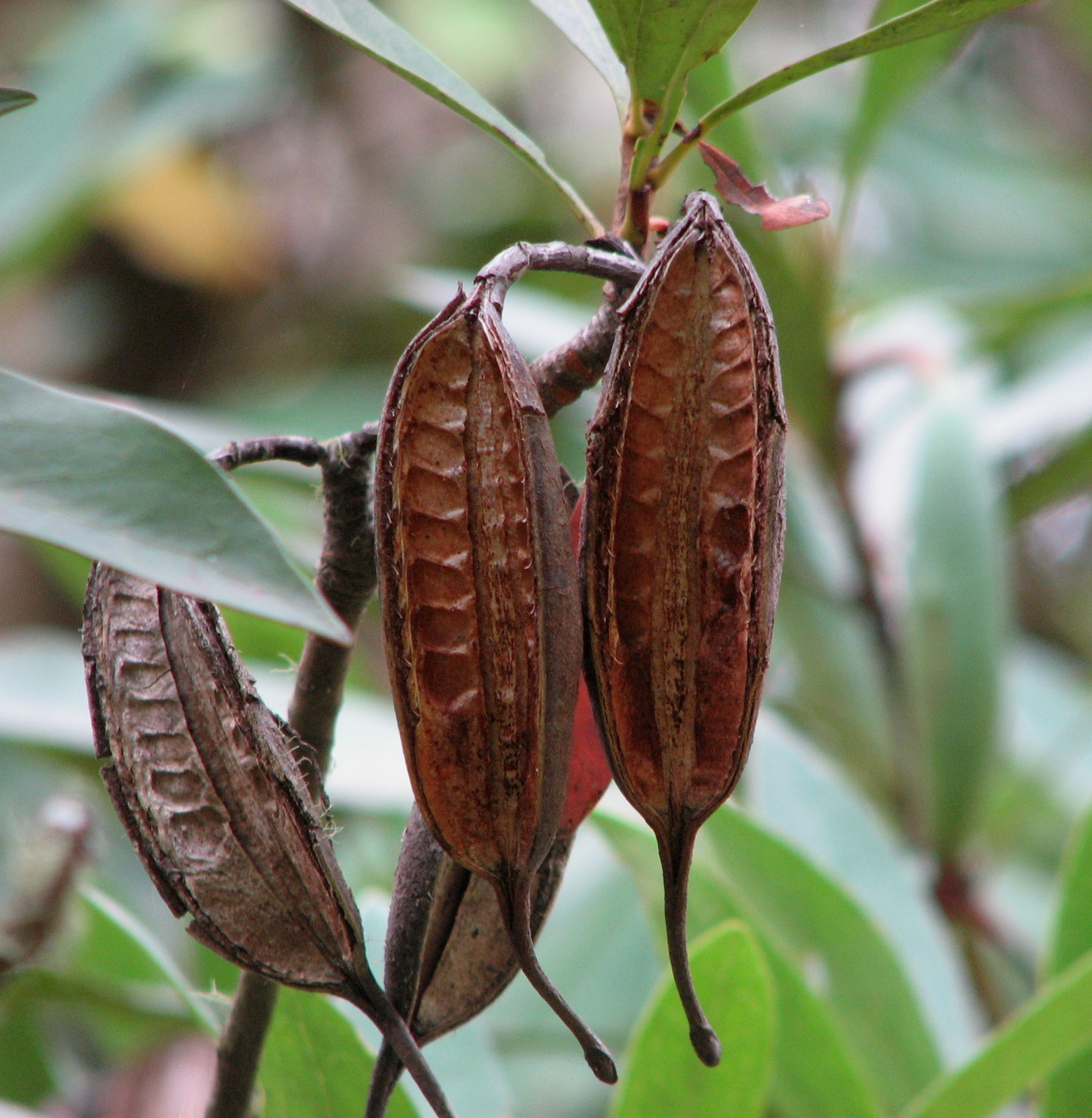
Open follicles following release of seeds

The Gippsland waratah was first formally described by the Victorian Government Botanist Ferdinand von Mueller in 1861 in Fragmenta Phytographiae Australiae. The type material was collected in rugged mountainous country around Nungatta Creek, a tributary of the Genoa River in south-eastern New South Wales. Mueller had been surveying the mountainous eastern part of the state since the 1850s. The species name is said to be derived from the Ancient Greek oreos "mountain" and hence means "of or relating to a mountain". The proper word for "mountain" in Ancient Greek is however oros (ὄρος). The only alternative scientific name proposed was in 1891, when Otto Kuntze named it as Hylogyne oreades, but it was rejected as an illegitimate name. Common names applies to the species include Gippsland-, Victorian-, mountain-, and tree waratah.

Telopea oreades is one of five species from southeastern Australia that make up the genus Telopea. No subspecies are recognised. It has been difficult to distinguish from the similar T. mongaensis, but microscopic analysis has revealed that T. oreades has features termed sclereids while T. mongaensis does not. The two are sister species, and their next closest relative is the Tasmanian waratah (T. truncata).

A disjunct northern population of T. oreades grows together with T. mongaensis in the southern Monga Valley in southern New South Wales, with some hybrids reported. Crisp and Weston concluded that the two species for the most part did not hybridise there. However, a genetic study using microsatellites found there was extensive hybridisation, with much of the presumed pure T. oreades showing a close relation to T. mongaensis. The populations of waratahs are thought to have grown and shrunk with the ebb and flow of ice ages in the Pleistocene, finally stranding a population of T. oreades located alongside T. mongaensis as conditions suitable for waratahs changed in southeastern Australia.

The genus lies in the subtribe Embothriinae, along with the tree waratahs (Alloxylon) from eastern Australia and New Caledonia, and Oreocallis and Chilean firetree (Embothrium coccineum) from South America. Almost all these species have red terminal flowers, and hence the subtribe's origin and floral appearance must predate the splitting of Gondwana into Australia, Antarctica, and South America over 60 million years ago.

== Distribution and habitat ==
Range in southeastern Australia (in red)

Telopea oreades occurs in moist forests and temperate rainforests of coastal ranges and tableland escarpments in two disjunct areas of southeastern Australia. The first is centred on East Gippsland in Victoria, from Orbost to the vicinity of Eden across the border in far southeastern New South Wales. There is a more northerly population around the Monga Valley near Braidwood, New South Wales extending to Moss Vale. There are unconfirmed reports of the species in the vicinity of Brown Mountain and Glenbog State Forest in southern New South Wales, which lie between the two areas. Plants in Victoria are found at altitudes ranging from 200 metres (660 ft) in Lind National Park to 1,300 metres (4,300 ft) on Mount Ellery. Wetter eastern and southern slopes are favoured habitats, and the annual rainfall ranges from 1,000 to 2,000 mm (39 to 79 in).

T. oreades grows in acidic soil that is high in nutrients and organic matter. Associated tree species in Victoria include shining gum (Eucalyptus nitens), messmate (E. obliqua), mountain grey gum (E. cypellocarpa), cut-tail (E. fastigata), silvertop ash (E. sieberi), southern sassafras (Atherosperma moschatum), black oliveberry (Elaeocarpus holopetalus), blanket leaf (Bedfordia arborescens), Australian blackwood (Acacia melanoxylon), privet mock‐olive (Notelaea ligustrina), banyalla (Pittosporum bicolor), Errinundra plum pine (Podocarpus sp. Goonmirk Rocks), Errinundra pepper (Tasmannia xerophila subsp. robusta) and soft tree fern (Dicksonia antarctica).

=== Conservation ===
Telopea oreades is not listed under Commonwealth environmental legislation and is not considered by respective state authorities to be rare or threatened in Victoria or New South Wales. The species does occur in the threatened Cool Temperate Rainforest Community in Victoria that is protected under the Flora and Fauna Guarantee Act, and it is a component of the threatened Southern Escarpment Wet Sclerophyll Forests of far southern New South Wales. Furthermore, planted specimens are frequently stolen from bush regeneration sites as they are desirable garden plants. Conversely in New Zealand, there is a report of T. oreades escaping into kanuka scrub from the trout hatchery gardens on the Tongariro River south of Lake Taupō.

== Ecology ==
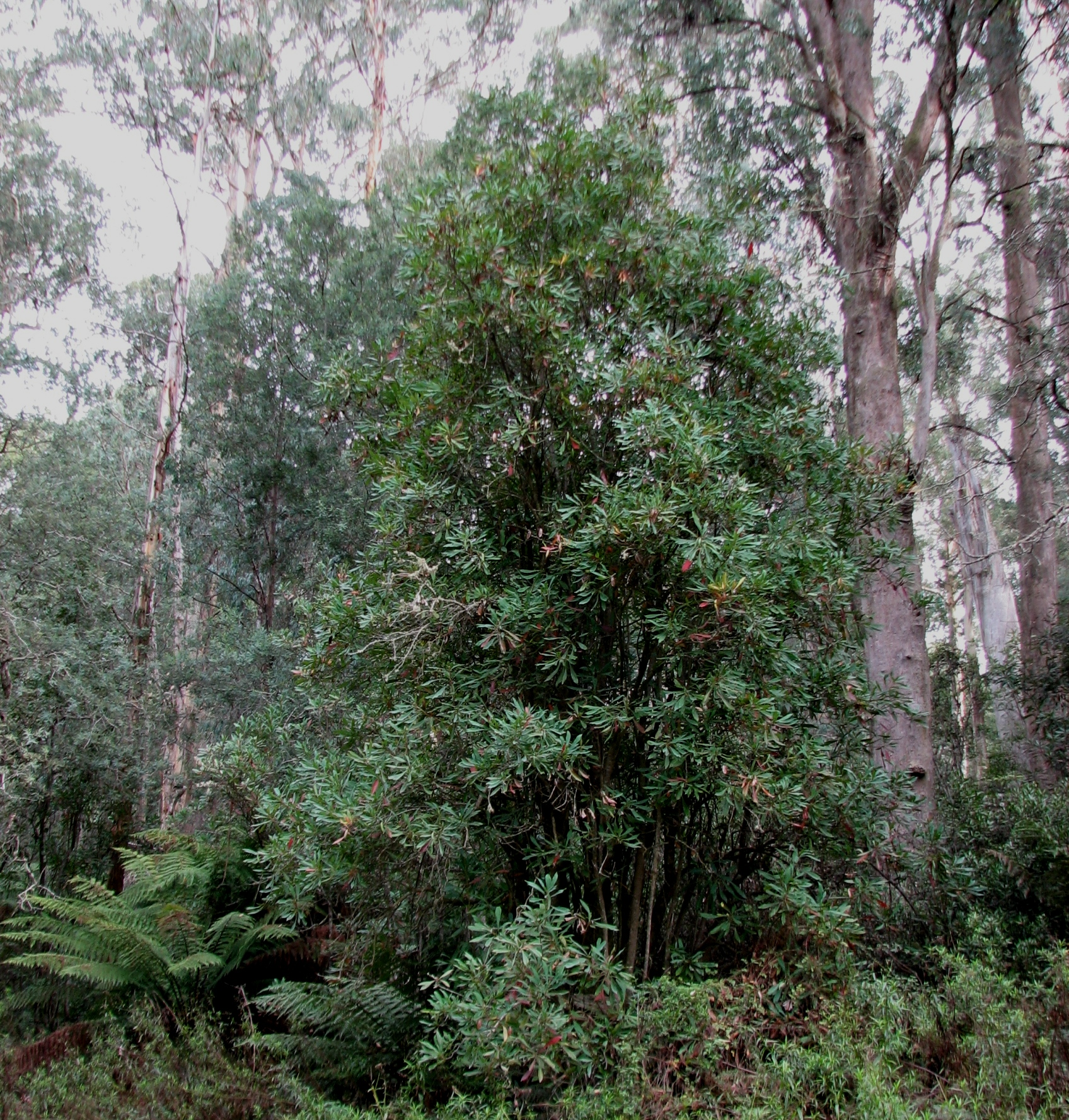
Mature plant in cool temperate rainforest habitat

The prominent position and striking colour of Telopea oreades and many of its relatives within the subtribe Embothriinae—both in Australia and South America—strongly suggest it is adapted to pollination by birds, and has been for over 60 million years. Birds recorded visiting the flowers for their nectar include red wattlebird (Anthochaera carunculata), eastern spinebill (Acanthorhynchus tenuirostris), crescent honeyeater (Phylidonyris pyrrhopterus), yellow-faced honeyeater (Lichenostomus chrysops), brown-headed honeyeater (Melithreptus brevirostris), white-naped honeyeater (Melithreptus lunatus) and silvereye (Zosterops lateralis).

T. oreades has a central taproot and few lateral roots. Like most Proteaceae, it has fine proteoid roots that arise from larger roots. These are roots with dense clusters of short lateral rootlets that form a mat in the soil just below the leaf litter. They are particularly efficient at absorbing nutrients from nutrient-poor soils, including the phosphorus-deficient native soils of Australia.

T. oreades has a swollen woody base largely under the soil known as a lignotuber, which stores energy and nutrients as a resource for rapid growth after a bushfire. The wet forests in which it grows seldom catch fire. When they do, the plant community becomes a more open sclerophyll woodland until slow-growing plants with larger leaves take over. New shoots grow from the lignotuber, which survives bushfire as the rest of the plant above ground is burnt. The seed also germinates and grows in post-bushfire soil, which is higher in nutrients and more open with fewer competing plant species. Waratah seeds are often eaten—and destroyed—by animals and do not travel far (several metres) from the parent plants.

== Cultivation and uses ==
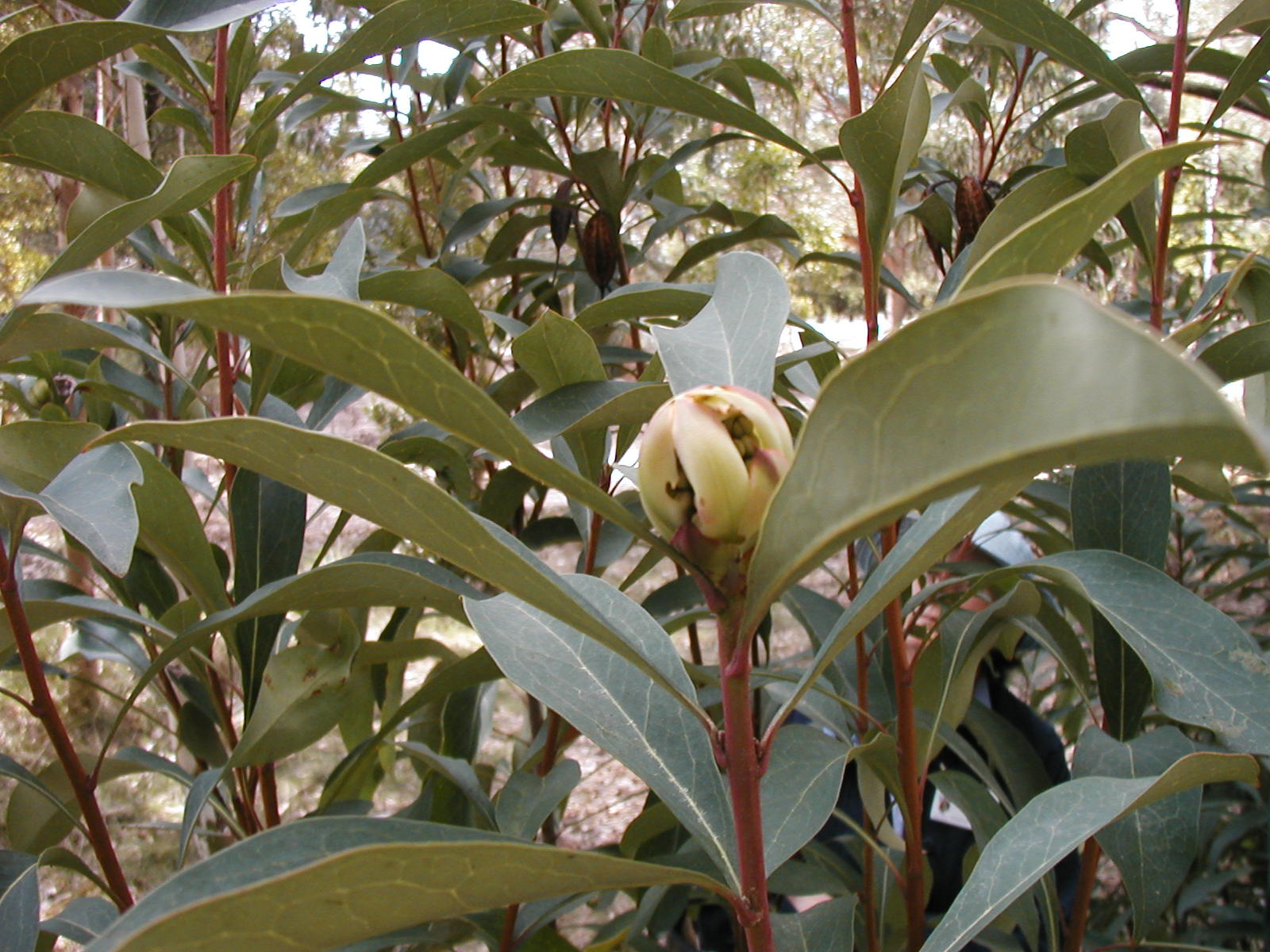
Developing flowerhead in bud

Telopea oreades needs a well-drained location as well as reliable moisture to thrive. Soil with some clay content is beneficial. It is more shade-tolerant than the more popular New South Wales waratah, preferring part-shade but tolerating sunny aspects. It tolerates moderate frosts. Plants can be hard-pruned—lopping old stems and branches can rejuvenate mature plants. Plants can benefit from low-phosphorus fertilizer applied in spring and autumn. Propagation is by seed, the germination rates of which fall significantly after several months' storage unless refrigerated, or by cuttings of new growth that has just hardened. Cultivars must be propagated by cutting to make daughter plants identical to the parent.

T. oreades has been grown successfully in England. The plant was first cultivated there by Canon Arthur Townsend Boscawen at Ludgvan in Cornwall from seed that he obtained in 1910. He had succeeded in bringing the plant into flower by 1915, providing material for illustration in Curtis's Botanical Magazine in 1916. A plant in Cornwall reached 4.6 metres (15 ft) in height, while another at Wakehurst Place reached 2.5 metres (8.2 ft) in the late 1980s. Although thriving at Wakehurst, the species can be very sensitive to English soils. The Royal Horticultural Society awarded the species an Award of Merit in 1916.

A selected white-flowered form from the Errinundra Plateau, which was originally known as 'Plateau View Alba' or 'Plateau View White', was registered by the Australian Cultivar Registration Authority in 1990 as 'Errindundra White'. Plantsmen have also developed several hybrids with T. speciosissima, looking to combine the hardiness of T. oreades with the showier flowerheads of the latter. Red-, pink- and even white-flowered cultivars are available.

- Telopea 'Champagne' is a cultivar registered under plant breeders' rights (PBR) in 2006. Its creamy yellow flowerheads appear from October to December. It is a three-way hybrid between T. speciosissima, T. oreades and the yellow-flowered form of T. truncata.
- Telopea 'Golden Globe' is a cultivar registered under PBR in 2005. Larger than 'Champagne', it is also a three-way hybrid between T. speciosissima, T. oreades and the yellow-flowered form of T. truncata. It has been propagated and sold as 'Shady Lady Yellow'. It was originally bred in the Dandenong Ranges east of Melbourne.
- Telopea 'Shady Lady Red' is a larger shrub that may reach 5 m (16 ft) high and 2 or 3 m (6.6 or 9.8 ft) wide. A hybrid of T. speciosissima and T. oreades, it arose by chance in a Melbourne garden. The first of the 'Shady Lady' series of cultivars, it became commercially available in the mid-1980s. The flowerheads are smaller and lack the bracts of the speciosissima parent. As its name suggests, it tolerates more shade. It is vigorous and more reliable in temperate and subtropical areas, and grows in semi-shade or sun.
- Telopea 'Shady Lady White' is a white-flowered hybrid between T. speciosissima and T. oreades.
- Telopea 'Shady Lady Pink' is the result of a cross between 'Shady Lady Red' and 'Shady Lady White'.
- Telopea 'Shady Lady Crimson' is a selected colour form developed from 'Shady Lady Red'. It became commercially available in Australia in 2010.

The timber is fairly hard and resembles silky oak (Grevillea robusta). It is durable and can be readily polished and worked with, making it amenable for use in furniture, picture frames and tool handles.
