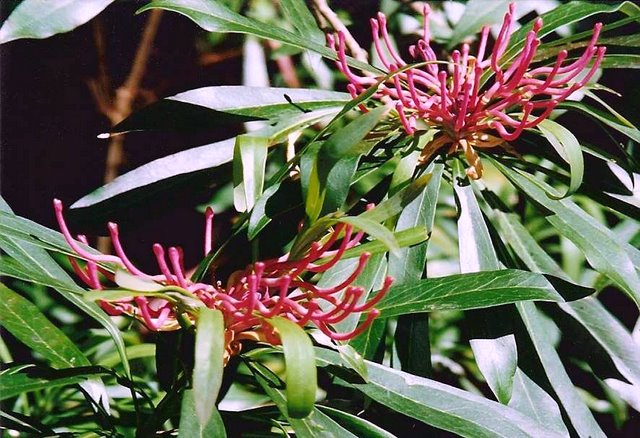
- Telopea mongaensis at Monga National Park

Scientific classification
- Kingdom: Plantae
- Clade: Tracheophytes
- Clade: Angiosperms
- Clade: Eudicots
- Order: Proteales
- Family: Proteaceae
- Genus: Telopea
- Species: T. mongaensis

Binomial name
- Telopea mongaensis Cheel
- Distribution of Telopea mongaensis

= Telopea mongaensis =

Species of plant endemic to Australia

Telopea mongaensis, commonly known as the Monga waratah or Braidwood waratah, is a shrub or small tree in the family Proteaceae. Endemic to Australia, it grows at high altitude in south eastern New South Wales, where it is often seen in moist areas at the edge of rainforest or by streams in eucalyptus forests. Growing to 6 m (20 ft) high, it has narrow green leaves 4–18 cm (1.6–7.1 in) in length, and 0.5–2 cm (0.20–0.79 in) wide. In spring bears many red flowerheads, each made up of 28 to 65 individual flowers.

In the garden, T. mongaensis grows in soils with good drainage and ample moisture in part-shaded or sunny positions. Several commercially available cultivars that are hybrid forms with T. speciosissima have been developed.

== Description ==
Telopea mongaensis grows as a tall shrub to 6 m (20 ft) high. The thin leaves are 4–18 cm (1.6–7.1 in) in length, and 0.5–2 cm (0.20–0.79 in) wide. The red flowers form in spring. Open, thin and wiry, the flowerheads (inflorescences) are not as spectacular as those of T. speciosissima but are much more numerous on the plant. Each flowerhead is around 6 to 10 cm (2.4 to 3.9 in) in diameter, and composed of anywhere from 28 to 65 individual small flowers, or florets. Each flower is encased in a perianth, which is a much brighter red on the surface facing the centre of the flower than the surface facing outwards. Anthesis, or the opening of the flowers, begins at the centre of the flowerhead and moves to the edges or base. The individual flower bears a sessile anther (that is, it lacks a filament), which lies next to the stigma at the end of the style. The ovary lies at the base of the style and atop a stalk known as the gynophore, and it is from here that the seed pods then develop. Meanwhile, a crescent shaped nectary lies at the base of the gynophore. The flowerheads are surrounded by green or pink leafy bracts 1.2–4.5 cm (0.47–1.77 in) in length, much less prominent than those of the New South Wales Waratah. Flowering is followed by the development of woody seed pods, 4.5–7 cm (1.8–2.8 in) long. The pods split longitudinally when mature and release the seeds.

It can be distinguished from the similar T. oreades, which generally has larger leaves and often grows with a tree-like habit. The leaves of the latter species tend to have less venation. Telopea oreades flowers around a month earlier than T. mongaensis in areas where they co-occur.

== Taxonomy ==
First described by Australian botanist Edwin Cheel in 1947, its specific name is derived from the region it grows, Monga. The type specimen collected on Sugarloaf Mountain near Braidwood. Common names include Monga waratah and Braidwood waratah. It had previously been considered a form of Telopea oreades. However, Cheel did not supply a means by which it could be distinguished from T. oreades. Later, microscopic analysis revealed that T. oreades had features termed sclereids while T. mongaensis did not.

A disjunct northern population of Telopea oreades grows together with T. mongaensis in the southern Monga Valley in southern New South Wales, with some hybrids reported. Michael Crisp and Peter Weston concluded that the two species for the most part did not hybridise there. However, a genetic study using microsatellites found there was extensive hybridisation, with much of the presumed pure T. oreades showing a close relation to T. mongaensis. The populations of waratahs are thought to have grown and shrunk with the ebb and flow of ice ages in the Pleistocene, finally stranding a population of T. oreades located alongside T. mongaensis as conditions suitable for waratahs changed in southeastern Australia. Telopea mongaensis has also hybridised with T. speciosissima at the northern limits of its range in New South Wales, where it overlaps with the latter species.

Telopea mongaensis is one of five species from southeastern Australia which make up the genus Telopea, and is most closely related to T. oreades. The next closest relative to the pair is the Tasmanian waratah (T. truncata). The genus lies in the subtribe Embothriinae, along with the tree waratahs (Alloxylon) from eastern Australia and New Caledonia, and Oreocallis and Chilean firetree (Embothrium coccineum) from South America. Almost all these species have red terminal flowers, and hence the subtribe's origin and floral appearance must predate the splitting of Gondwana into Australia, Antarctica, and South America over 60 million years ago.

== Distribution and habitat ==
This plant may be seen between Fitzroy Falls in the north, and Monga National Park to the south. Its habitat is on the margins of temperate rainforest or in wet eucalypt forest, where it may be found along creeks or on mountain slopes, at an altitude of 540 to 760 m (1,770 to 2,490 ft). It grows on sandy soils of alluvial origin. It is often associated with such trees as brown barrel (Eucalyptus fastigata), silvertop ash (E. sieberi), broad-leaved peppermint (E. dives), Sydney peppermint (E. piperita), and the understorey plants pinkwood (Eucryphia moorei), soft tree fern (Dicksonia antarctica), coral fern (Gleichenia), mountain devil (Lambertia formosa) and hairpin banksia (Banksia spinulosa). The annual rainfall where it grows is 1,000–1,100 mm (39–43 in).

== Ecology ==
The prominent position and striking colour of Telopea mongaensis and many of its relatives within the subtribe Embothriinae both in Australia and South America strongly suggest it is adapted to pollination by birds, and has been for over 60 million years.

Telopea mongaensis has a swollen woody base largely under the soil known as a lignotuber, which stores energy and nutrients as a resource for rapid growth after a bushfire. New shoots grow from the lignotuber, which survives bushfire as the rest of the plant above ground is burnt. The seed also germinates and grows in post-bushfire soil, which is higher in nutrients and more open with fewer competing plant species. Waratah seeds are often eaten—and destroyed—by animals and do not travel far (several metres) from the parent plants.

== Cultivation ==
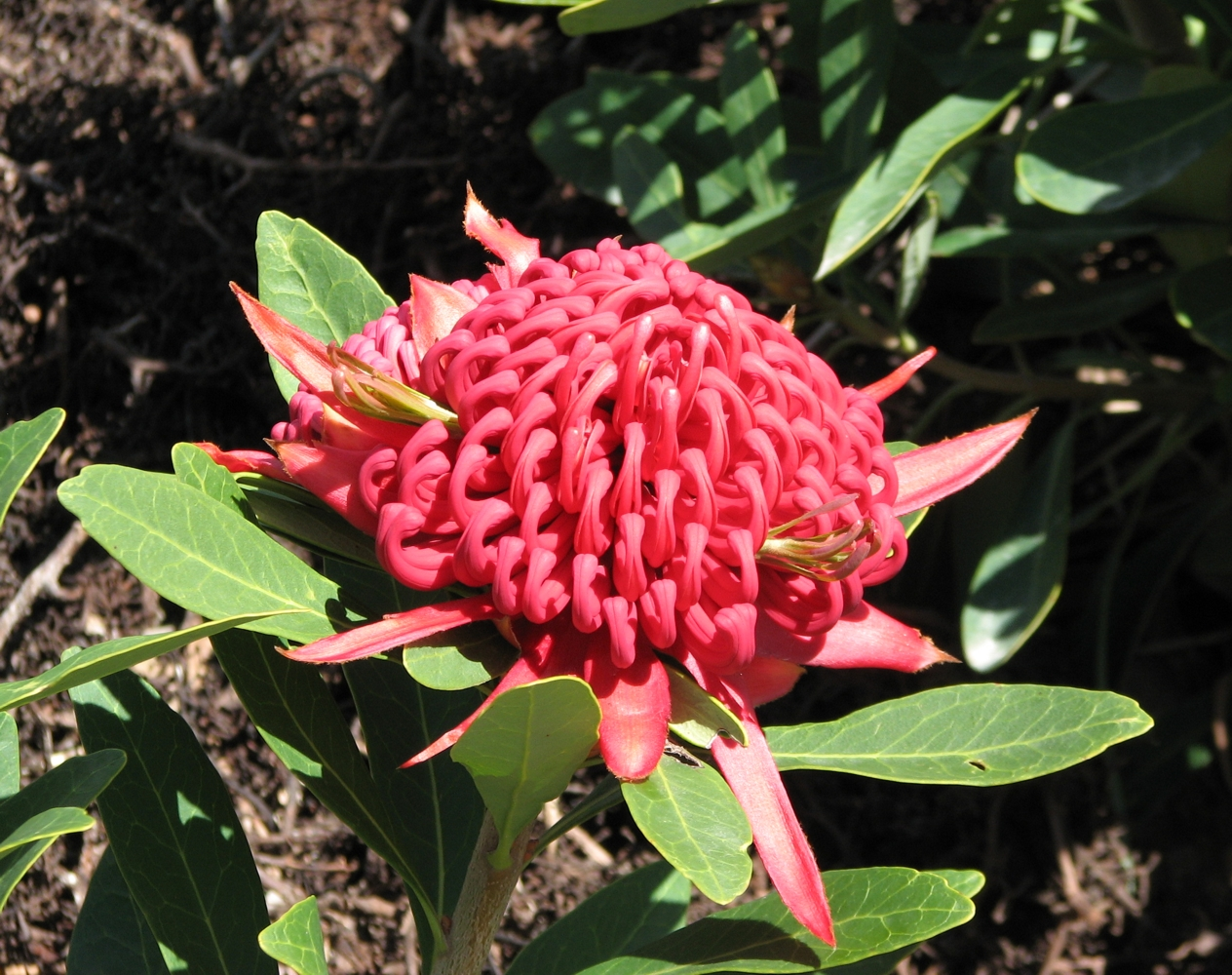
Telopea 'Braidwood Brilliant'

Initial attempts to cultivate it by Cheel and Joseph Maiden in Sydney were unsuccessful. Telopea mongaensis is more tolerant of shade, heavier soils and cooler climates than its more showy relative. It grows as a more compact plant of around 2 m (6.6 ft) in height in full sun. It is frost tolerant and has been grown in southern England, and has been awarded an Award of Merit by the Royal Horticultural Society in 1980. It attracts birds to the garden.

Telopea 'Braidwood Brilliant' is a hybrid between this species and the showy Telopea speciosissima that was first grown in 1962 and registered with the Australian Cultivar Registration Authority (ACRA) in 1974. Bred by the Reverend Colin Burgess, parent plant stock was selected from cold areas with the aim of breeding a hardy plant. The pollen was taken from T. speciossissima plants from Wentworth Falls in the Blue Mountains and used on T. mongaensis from Braidwood. The plant grows to around 4 m (13 ft) tall and has flower heads 6–8 cm (2.4–3.1 in) in diameter. They appear to tolerate frosts down to a temperature of −6 C readily. Conversely, they can be adversely affected by heat in climates warmer than their provenance.
