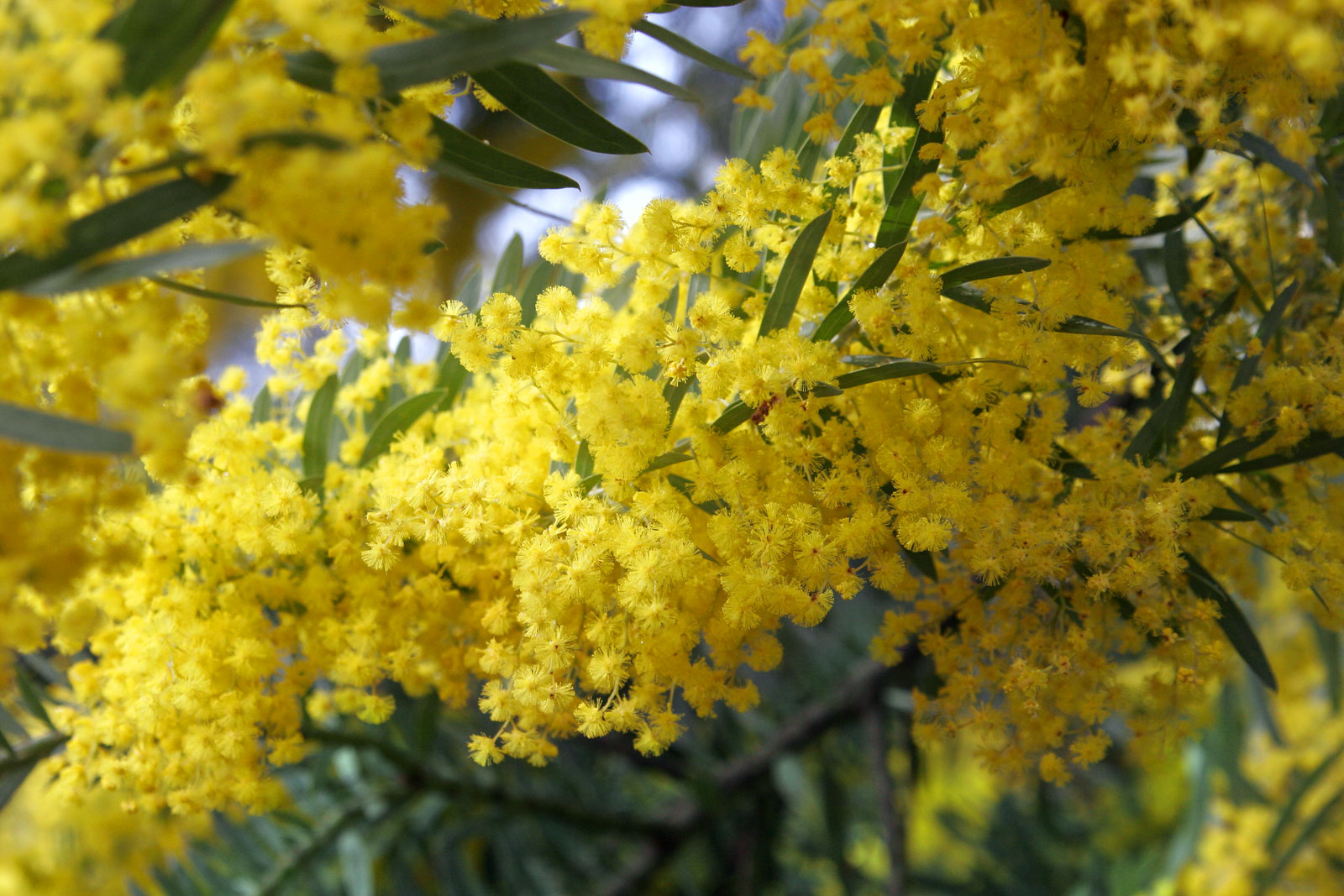
- In the Australian National Botanic Gardens

Scientific classification
- Kingdom: Plantae
- Clade: Tracheophytes
- Clade: Angiosperms
- Clade: Eudicots
- Clade: Rosids
- Order: Fabales
- Family: Fabaceae
- Subfamily: Caesalpinioideae
- Clade: Mimosoid clade
- Genus: Acacia
- Species: A. covenyi

Binomial name
- Acacia covenyi Tindale
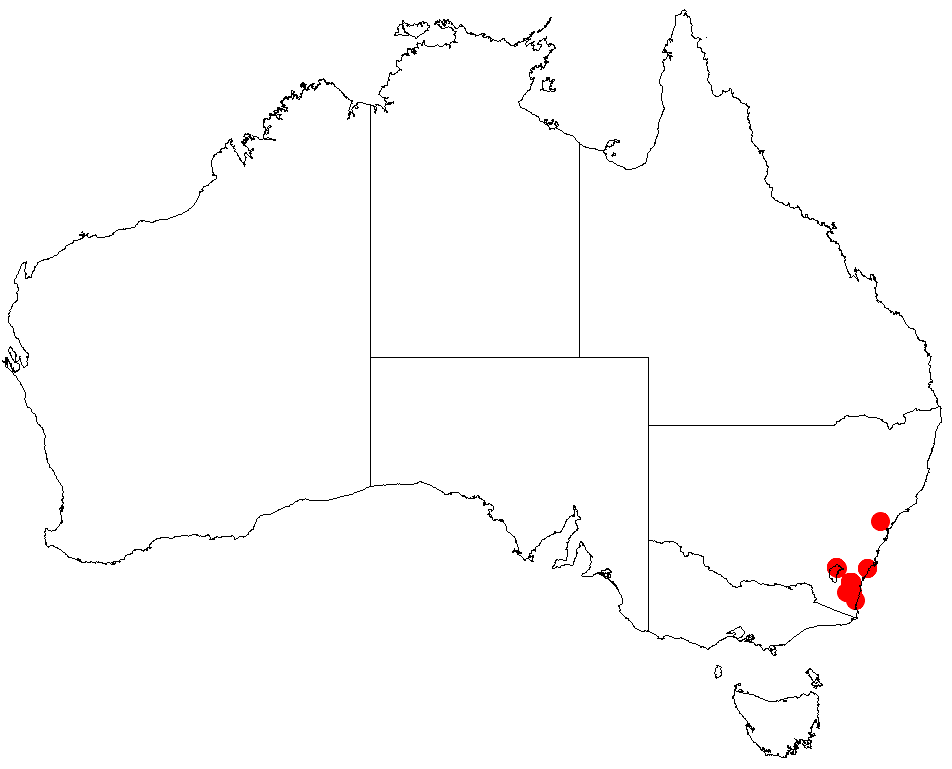
- Occurrence data from AVH

Synonyms
- Racosperma covenyi (Tindale) Pedley

= Acacia covenyi =

Species of plant

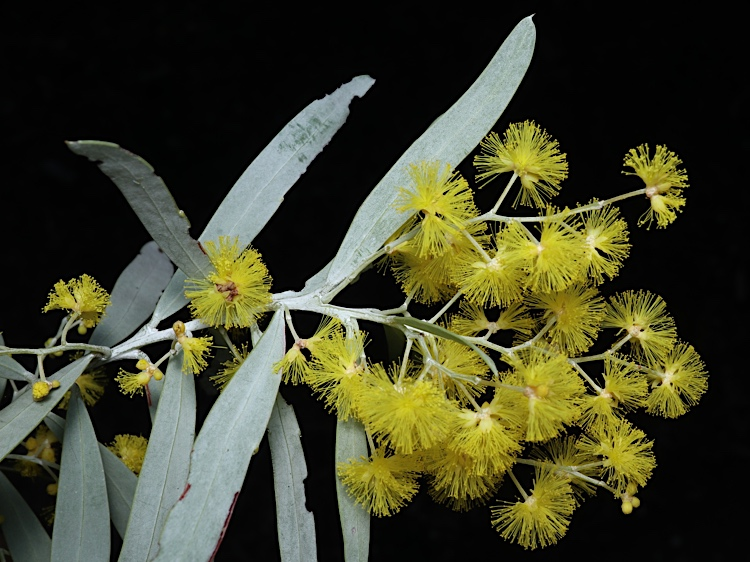
Detail of flowers

Acacia covenyi, commonly known as blue bush, is a species of flowering plant in the family Fabaceae and is endemic to a restricted part of New South Wales, Australia. It is a glabrous shrub or tree with crowded, narrowly oblong phyllodes, flowers arranged in spherical heads of bright yellow flowers and papery to thinly leathery, narrowly oblong pods.

== Description ==
Acacia covenyi is a glabrous shrub or tree that typically grows to a height of 1.5–7.5 m (4 ft 11 in – 24 ft 7 in), and has branchlets that are covered with a white, powdery bloom and angled at the end. The phyllodes are crowded, on raised stem-projections, narrowly oblong, 35–55 mm (1.4–2.2 in) long and 5–11 mm (0.20–0.43 in) wide, thin and glaucous. The flowers are borne in spherical heads in racemes 30–60 mm (1.2–2.4 in) long, usually slightly wavy and covered with a white bloom, each head with 5 to 8 bright yellow flowers. Flowering occurs in August and September and the pods are narrowly oblong, firmly papery to thinly leathery, up to 80 mm (3.1 in) long. 8–13 mm (0.31–0.51 in) wide and covered with a powdery bloom. The seeds are egg-shaped, black, 4.0–4.5 mm (0.16–0.18 in) long with a club-shaped aril.

== Taxonomy ==
Acacia covenyi was first formally described in 1980 by Mary Tindale in the journal Telopea from specimens collected near Con Creek, Bendethera, about 20 mi (32 km) west of Moruya by Ernest Francis Constable in 1966. The specific epithet (covenyi) honours Robert Coveny for his help in obtaining material for Tindale's research work.

== Distribution and habitat ==
Blue bush grows in thickets, mainly on limestone slopes and ridges, but sometimes on quartzite, and is restricted to the eastern hills of the Great Dividing Range from near the Deua River to near the Kybeyan River.

== See also ==
- List of Acacia species
