= Climate of Tasmania =

Köppen climate types in Tasmania

Tasmania has a cool temperate climate with four distinct seasons. The highest recorded maximum temperature in Tasmania is 42.2 °C (108.0 °F) at Scamander on 30 January 2009, during the 2009 heat wave. Tasmania's lowest recorded minimum temperature is −14.2 °C (6.4 °F) on 7 August 2020, at Central Plateau.

Rainfall in Tasmania is highly differentiated for a relatively compact island. It follows a complicated pattern rather analogous to that found on large continents at the same latitude in the northern hemisphere. Rainfall increases from around 506 millimetres (19.9 in) at Ouse in the centre to 2,690 millimetres (106 in) at Cradle Valley in the northwestern highlands.

Sunshine is also highly differentiated, with average quotients ranging from around 4 hours a day (under 1,500 hours a year) in the South West of the island, up to around 7 hours daily (2,550 hours annually) in the North East around the Launceston area. It shares a similar climate to places like the United Kingdom, New Zealand, the Pacific Northwest region of the United States, and Vancouver Island region of Canada.

== Climate data ==
Climate data for Tasmania
Month	Jan	Feb	Mar	Apr	May	Jun	Jul	Aug	Sep	Oct	Nov	Dec	Year
Record high °C (°F)	42.2 (108.0)	40.1 (104.2)	40.1 (104.2)	32.3 (90.1)	28.8 (83.8)	22.0 (71.6)	24.0 (75.2)	25.0 (77.0)	31.1 (88.0)	34.6 (94.3)	38.5 (101.3)	41.9 (107.4)	42.2 (108.0)
Record low °C (°F)	−4.0 (24.8)	−4.0 (24.8)	−6.9 (19.6)	−7.7 (18.1)	−10.5 (13.1)	−13.0 (8.6)	−12.5 (9.5)	−14.2 (6.4)	−10.7 (12.7)	−8.5 (16.7)	−6.8 (19.8)	−5.0 (23.0)	−14.2 (6.4)
Source: Bureau of Meteorology

== Rainfall ==
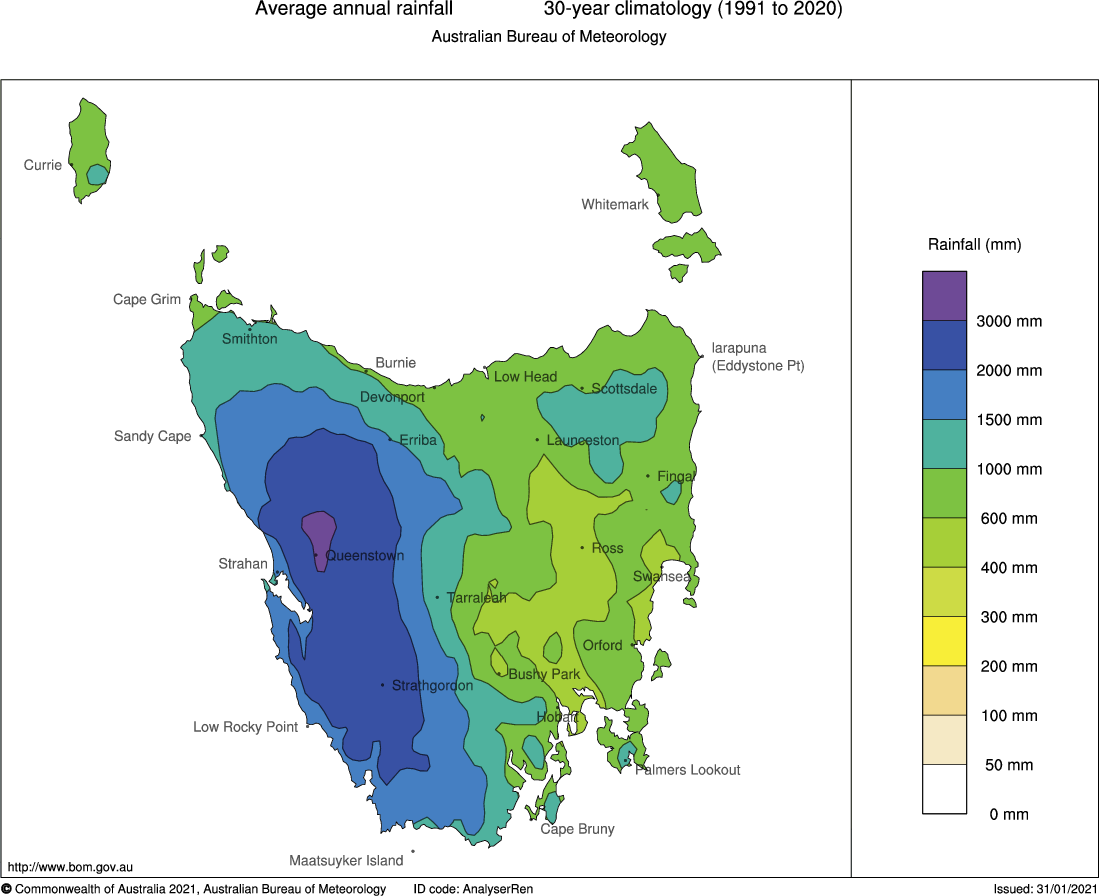
Annual average rainfall for Tasmania (1991-2020)

In most parts of the state, particularly the western portion, most rain falls during the winter months and is normally associated with frontal systems. Elevation also has an important influence on rainfall, with the mountain areas of western Tasmania receiving higher rainfall totals. It is worth noting that the eastern portion features relatively drier weather than on the west side because of the föhn wind effect created by the Central Highlands in the Great Dividing Range, thereby elevating fire danger in the region.

The wettest part of the State is the west coast, where there is a strong winter maximum in rainfall: January and February typically averages only one-third the rainfall of July and August, though even in the driest months rain usually falls on every second day and the number of rainy days per year is much greater than on any part of the Australian mainland. Further east in the Lake Country, annual rainfall declines to around 900 millimetres (35 in), whilst in the Midlands (i.e. further east again), annual rainfall is as low as 450 millimetres (18 in) at Ross and generally below 600 millimetres (24 in). The eastern part of Tasmania has rainfall more evenly distributed throughout the year than in the west, and most months receive very similar averages.

The densely populated northern coast is much drier than the western side, with annual rainfall ranging from 666 millimetres (26.2 in) in Launceston to 955 millimetres (37.6 in) in Burnie in the north west and 993 millimetres (39.1 in) in Scottsdale located further to the east. Most rain falls in winter, and in summer the average can be as low as 31 millimetres (1.2 in) per month in Launceston. The east coast is wetter than the Midlands, with an average annual rainfall ranging from 775 millimetres (30.5 in) in St. Helens to around 640 millimetres (25 in) in Swansea. Here the rainfall is evenly distributed over the year but can be very erratic as heavy rainfalls from the warm Tasman Sea are quite frequent. Whereas a three-day fall of 125 millimetres (4.9 in) occurs only once every fifty years on the north coast, it occurs on average once every four or five years around Swansea and Bicheno. On 7–8 June 1954, there were many falls as large as 230 millimetres (9.1 in) in two days in that area. The east coast is sometimes called the "sun coast" because of its sunny climate.

In the south-east, including Hobart, Spring receives slightly more rainfall than Winter, and Spring also has slightly more rainy days than Winter.

== Summer ==
Summer is from December to February when the average maximum sea temperature is 21 °C (70 °F). On land, maximum temperatures average 20 °C (68 °F) to 24 °C (75 °F) along the coast and in the lowlands, such as around Launceston. The hottest areas of the state are in the valleys west of Hobart, where summer temperatures regularly exceed 25 °C (77 °F). During heatwaves, temperatures in this region can rise above 40 °C (104 °F). The Tasmanian highlands are much cooler, with Liawenee, located on the Central Plateau, one of the coldest places in Australia with temperatures in February ranging between 4 °C (39 °F) to 17 °C (63 °F).

== Winter ==
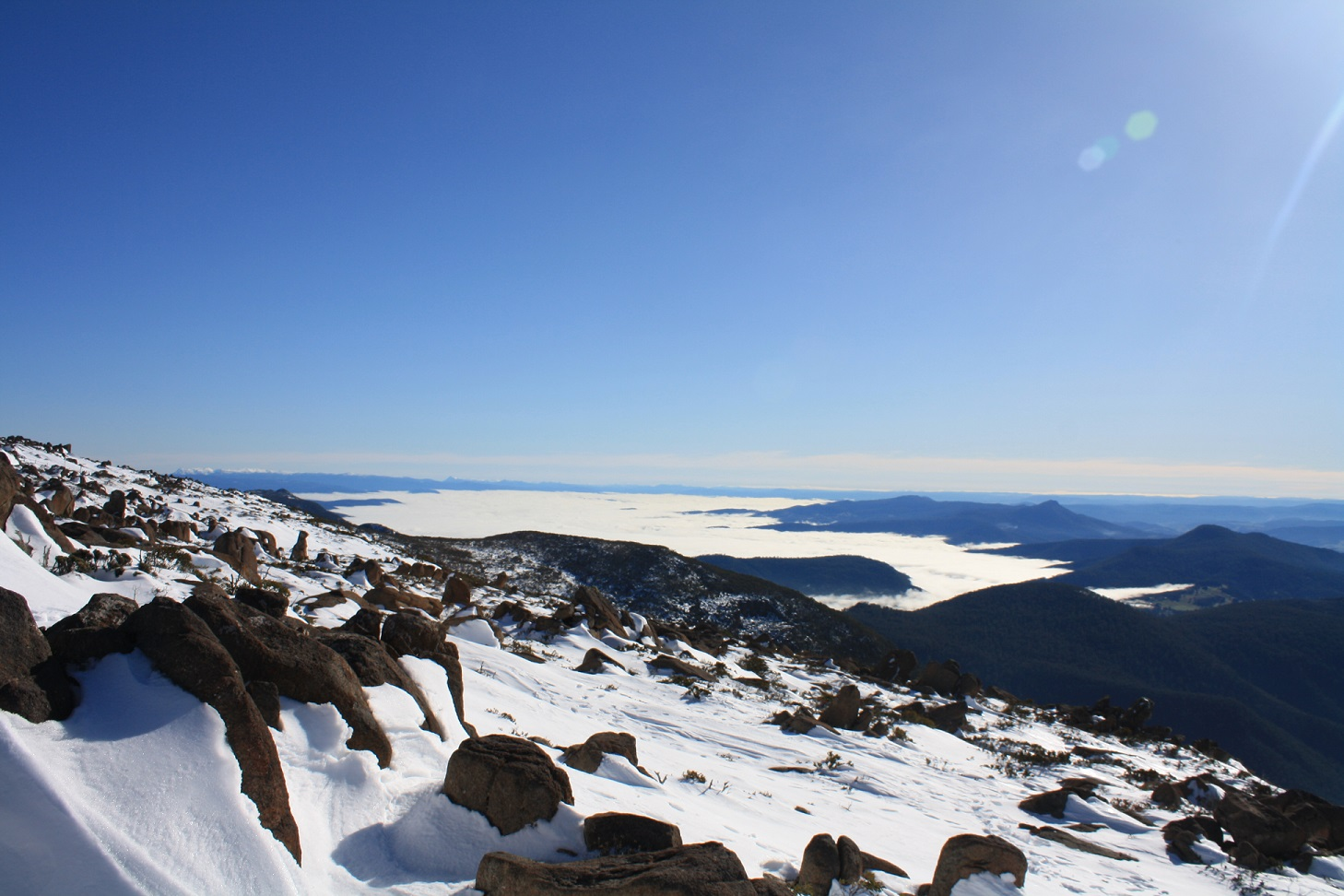
Snow at Mount Wellington.

The winter months are June, July, and August, and are generally the wettest and coolest months in the state, with most elevated areas receiving considerable snowfall. Winter maximums range from 12 °C (54 °F) along the coast, to 3 °C (37 °F) on the Central Plateau, thanks to frequent cold fronts from the Southern Ocean. Minimum temperatures however are warmer than mainland Australia, most of coastal Tasmania rarely drops below freezing and daily temperature variation is often very narrow. Due to this, however, it’s rare for lowland regions of Tasmania to experience snow, with snow pellets mostly taking the form of graupel or hail. Elevated, inland areas can however drop below −10 °C (14 °F) during clear nights between fronts, while during snowy weather the maximum temperature may not rise above 0 °C (32 °F).

== Spring ==
The Spring months are September, October, and November. It is a season of frequent changes, as winter weather patterns begin to take the shape of summer patterns, although snowfall is still common in mountainous areas until October. These changes can be rather extreme at times, with some days having hail, sunshine and violent winds in a timespan as little as an hour. Spring is the windiest time of the year with afternoon sea breezes starting to take effect on the coast.

== Autumn ==
Autumn is from March to May and is a season of transition, as summer weather patterns gradually take on the shape of winter patterns. The beginning of Autumn ( March until mid-April) tend to be warmer and sunnier than Spring, particularly in Northern Tasmania.

== Locations ==
=== Hobart ===
Hobart has a mild temperate oceanic climate (Koppen: Cfb), with four distinct seasons. The highest temperature recorded was 41.8 °C on 4 January 2013 and the lowest was −2.8 °C on 25 June 1972. Compared to other major Australia cities Hobart has the second fewest daily average hours of sunshine, with 5.9 hours (Melbourne has the fewest).

The city rarely receives snow in winter; however, the adjacent Mount Wellington is often seen with a covering in winter, and it has received unseasonal snowfalls in all seasons, including summer. Although snow is unusual in general at sea level in Australia, Hobart has most probably had the most sea level snowfalls out of any state capital. For its latitude however, snowfall is still unusually scarce in Hobart, whereas other cities on the same latitude in the northern hemisphere (such as Boston, Detroit, Plovdiv, Bishkek and Chongjin) would generally feature snowy winters.

Climate data for Hobart (Battery Point) 1991–2020 averages, 1882–present extremes
Month	Jan	Feb	Mar	Apr	May	Jun	Jul	Aug	Sep	Oct	Nov	Dec	Year
Record high °C (°F)	41.8 (107.2)	40.1 (104.2)	39.1 (102.4)	32.3 (90.1)	26.9 (80.4)	20.6 (69.1)	22.1 (71.8)	24.5 (76.1)	31.0 (87.8)	34.6 (94.3)	36.8 (98.2)	40.8 (105.4)	41.8 (107.2)
Mean maximum °C (°F)	35.2 (95.4)	33.3 (91.9)	30.8 (87.4)	25.5 (77.9)	21.3 (70.3)	17.5 (63.5)	16.7 (62.1)	19.6 (67.3)	22.8 (73.0)	27.2 (81.0)	30.3 (86.5)	32.1 (89.8)	36.9 (98.4)
Mean daily maximum °C (°F)	22.7 (72.9)	22.2 (72.0)	20.7 (69.3)	17.9 (64.2)	15.3 (59.5)	12.7 (54.9)	12.6 (54.7)	13.7 (56.7)	15.7 (60.3)	17.6 (63.7)	19.1 (66.4)	21.0 (69.8)	17.6 (63.7)
Daily mean °C (°F)	17.9 (64.2)	17.5 (63.5)	16.2 (61.2)	13.7 (56.7)	11.5 (52.7)	9.1 (48.4)	8.9 (48.0)	9.7 (49.5)	11.3 (52.3)	13.0 (55.4)	14.6 (58.3)	16.3 (61.3)	13.3 (55.9)
Mean daily minimum °C (°F)	13.0 (55.4)	12.8 (55.0)	11.6 (52.9)	9.4 (48.9)	7.6 (45.7)	5.5 (41.9)	5.2 (41.4)	5.6 (42.1)	6.9 (44.4)	8.3 (46.9)	10.0 (50.0)	11.6 (52.9)	9.0 (48.2)
Mean minimum °C (°F)	8.2 (46.8)	7.9 (46.2)	6.4 (43.5)	4.2 (39.6)	2.8 (37.0)	0.9 (33.6)	1.1 (34.0)	1.4 (34.5)	2.2 (36.0)	3.3 (37.9)	5.0 (41.0)	6.7 (44.1)	0.5 (32.9)
Record low °C (°F)	3.3 (37.9)	3.4 (38.1)	1.8 (35.2)	0.7 (33.3)	−1.6 (29.1)	−2.8 (27.0)	−2.8 (27.0)	−1.8 (28.8)	−0.8 (30.6)	0.0 (32.0)	0.3 (32.5)	3.3 (37.9)	−2.8 (27.0)
Average rainfall mm (inches)	43.7 (1.72)	37.8 (1.49)	37.0 (1.46)	42.6 (1.68)	39.2 (1.54)	46.0 (1.81)	44.5 (1.75)	63.0 (2.48)	55.6 (2.19)	52.8 (2.08)	50.7 (2.00)	53.0 (2.09)	565.9 (22.28)
Average precipitation days (≥ 0.2 mm)	9.5	9.1	11.3	11.1	12.0	12.4	14.1	15.3	15.7	15.0	13.5	11.7	150.7
Average rainy days (≥ 1 mm)	5.5	5.2	6.7	7.2	6.5	7.2	8.4	9.9	9.7	9.2	8.1	7.4	91.0
Average afternoon relative humidity (%)	51	52	52	56	58	64	61	56	53	51	53	49	55
Mean monthly sunshine hours	257.3	226.0	210.8	177.0	148.8	132.0	151.9	179.8	195.0	232.5	234.0	248.0	2,393.1
Percentage possible sunshine	59	62	57	59	53	49	53	58	59	58	56	53	56
Source 1: Bureau of Meteorology (1991–2020 averages; extremes 1882–present)
Source 2: Bureau of Meteorology, Hobart Airport (sunshine hours)

=== Launceston ===
Launceston has a mild, temperate climate, with four distinct seasons. It has an oceanic climate (Cfb) with some Mediterranean climate (Csb) tendencies according to Koppen. The city is located in the Tamar Valley and is surrounded by many large hills and mountains. With this type of topography, Launceston's weather patterns can change in a short period of time.

Climate data for Launceston (Ti Tree Bend)
Month	Jan	Feb	Mar	Apr	May	Jun	Jul	Aug	Sep	Oct	Nov	Dec	Year
Record high °C (°F)	39.0 (102.2)	34.4 (93.9)	33.0 (91.4)	27.7 (81.9)	22.0 (71.6)	18.4 (65.1)	18.4 (65.1)	20.3 (68.5)	24.8 (76.6)	28.7 (83.7)	30.7 (87.3)	33.8 (92.8)	39.0 (102.2)
Mean daily maximum °C (°F)	24.2 (75.6)	24.5 (76.1)	22.5 (72.5)	18.8 (65.8)	15.8 (60.4)	13.1 (55.6)	12.6 (54.7)	13.7 (56.7)	15.5 (59.9)	18.0 (64.4)	20.4 (68.7)	22.4 (72.3)	18.5 (65.3)
Daily mean °C (°F)	18.2 (64.8)	18.3 (64.9)	16.3 (61.3)	13.2 (55.8)	10.4 (50.7)	8.0 (46.4)	7.4 (45.3)	8.7 (47.7)	10.3 (50.5)	12.3 (54.1)	14.7 (58.5)	16.5 (61.7)	12.9 (55.2)
Mean daily minimum °C (°F)	12.2 (54.0)	12.1 (53.8)	10.1 (50.2)	7.5 (45.5)	5.0 (41.0)	2.9 (37.2)	2.2 (36.0)	3.6 (38.5)	5.1 (41.2)	6.9 (44.4)	8.9 (48.0)	10.6 (51.1)	7.3 (45.1)
Record low °C (°F)	2.5 (36.5)	3.4 (38.1)	0.5 (32.9)	−1.5 (29.3)	−3 (27)	−4.9 (23.2)	−5.2 (22.6)	−3.5 (25.7)	−2.4 (27.7)	−1.4 (29.5)	−2 (28)	2.0 (35.6)	−5.2 (22.6)
Average rainfall mm (inches)	46.3 (1.82)	31.3 (1.23)	34.9 (1.37)	53.2 (2.09)	62.4 (2.46)	67.8 (2.67)	76.5 (3.01)	85.9 (3.38)	66.5 (2.62)	51.6 (2.03)	49.7 (1.96)	47.2 (1.86)	673.3 (26.51)
Average rainy days (≥ 0.2 mm)	7.7	6.3	6.4	9.0	10.7	12.6	14.5	15.1	14.0	11.7	9.9	8.7	126.6
Average afternoon relative humidity (%)	48	49	48	56	63	69	69	63	59	54	52	49	57
Mean monthly sunshine hours	285.2	256.9	241.8	198.0	155.0	135.0	142.6	170.5	201.0	254.2	267.0	282.1	2,589.3
Source 1: Bureau of Meteorology (1981–2010 averages; extremes 1980–present)
Source 2: Bureau of Meteorology, Launceston Airport (1981–2004 sunshine hours)

=== Ouse ===
Due to its inland location, Ouse has relatively warm summers and cool winters with a high diurnal range and low precipitation throughout the months. Frost is common in the winter.

Climate data for Ouse Fire Station
Month	Jan	Feb	Mar	Apr	May	Jun	Jul	Aug	Sep	Oct	Nov	Dec	Year
Record high °C (°F)	40.7 (105.3)	39.0 (102.2)	36.4 (97.5)	30.5 (86.9)	26.0 (78.8)	19.3 (66.7)	19.6 (67.3)	22.5 (72.5)	27.1 (80.8)	30.8 (87.4)	33.6 (92.5)	38.0 (100.4)	40.7 (105.3)
Mean daily maximum °C (°F)	25.4 (77.7)	25.3 (77.5)	22.3 (72.1)	18.3 (64.9)	14.8 (58.6)	11.9 (53.4)	11.7 (53.1)	13.6 (56.5)	15.8 (60.4)	17.9 (64.2)	21.0 (69.8)	23.0 (73.4)	18.4 (65.1)
Mean daily minimum °C (°F)	10.1 (50.2)	10.0 (50.0)	7.9 (46.2)	4.9 (40.8)	3.6 (38.5)	1.4 (34.5)	1.0 (33.8)	2.0 (35.6)	3.9 (39.0)	5.3 (41.5)	7.2 (45.0)	8.7 (47.7)	5.5 (41.9)
Record low °C (°F)	−0.4 (31.3)	0.2 (32.4)	−3.2 (26.2)	−5.6 (21.9)	−6.3 (20.7)	−7.8 (18.0)	−6.8 (19.8)	−6.7 (19.9)	−4.3 (24.3)	−3.5 (25.7)	−2.7 (27.1)	0.0 (32.0)	−7.8 (18.0)
Average precipitation mm (inches)	26.3 (1.04)	31.3 (1.23)	31.1 (1.22)	29.7 (1.17)	34.0 (1.34)	41.8 (1.65)	48.1 (1.89)	64.2 (2.53)	67.8 (2.67)	51.8 (2.04)	38.7 (1.52)	33.9 (1.33)	506.3 (19.93)
Average precipitation days (≥ 0.1 mm)	8.5	8.0	9.6	10.2	13.3	14.6	16.6	16.8	15.8	15.4	12.2	11.2	152.2
Average relative humidity (%)	39	41	47	55	63	71	68	61	57	54	49	43	54
Source: Bureau of Meteorology

=== Burnie ===
The average temperature in summer ranges from 12.5 to 21 °C with drier non-sea breeze days as warm as 27 °C, with around 16 hours of sunshine per day. In winter, temperature ranges from 6 to 13 °C, and only 8 hours of sunshine. Relative humidity averages over 60% for the year in the afternoon.

Burnie averages 994 mm of rainfall per year. Most of the rain is in the second half of the year from July to December.

Climate data for Burnie
Month	Jan	Feb	Mar	Apr	May	Jun	Jul	Aug	Sep	Oct	Nov	Dec	Year
Record high °C (°F)	33.8 (92.8)	31.0 (87.8)	28.9 (84.0)	26.2 (79.2)	24.0 (75.2)	18.8 (65.8)	18.2 (64.8)	18.9 (66.0)	22.4 (72.3)	27.6 (81.7)	31.5 (88.7)	31.2 (88.2)	33.8 (92.8)
Mean daily maximum °C (°F)	21.1 (70.0)	21.3 (70.3)	20.1 (68.2)	17.7 (63.9)	15.3 (59.5)	13.5 (56.3)	12.7 (54.9)	13.1 (55.6)	14.3 (57.7)	15.9 (60.6)	17.8 (64.0)	19.5 (67.1)	16.9 (62.4)
Mean daily minimum °C (°F)	12.6 (54.7)	13.3 (55.9)	12.0 (53.6)	10.0 (50.0)	8.4 (47.1)	6.7 (44.1)	5.9 (42.6)	6.1 (43.0)	6.8 (44.2)	8.0 (46.4)	9.7 (49.5)	11.1 (52.0)	9.2 (48.6)
Record low °C (°F)	2.8 (37.0)	3.9 (39.0)	3.5 (38.3)	0.5 (32.9)	0.0 (32.0)	−1.1 (30.0)	−1.7 (28.9)	−2.0 (28.4)	0.0 (32.0)	−0.8 (30.6)	1.0 (33.8)	2.9 (37.2)	−2.0 (28.4)
Average precipitation mm (inches)	44.1 (1.74)	43.7 (1.72)	51.5 (2.03)	74.4 (2.93)	92.8 (3.65)	102.0 (4.02)	123.2 (4.85)	112.3 (4.42)	88.9 (3.50)	84.8 (3.34)	69.2 (2.72)	63.9 (2.52)	950.2 (37.41)
Source: Bureau of Meteorology

=== Queenstown ===
Queenstown has a very wet climate, and is one of the wettest locations in Tasmania with an annual average rainfall of 2408.2 mm (94.8 in), spread throughout the year.

Climate data for Queenstown
Month	Jan	Feb	Mar	Apr	May	Jun	Jul	Aug	Sep	Oct	Nov	Dec	Year
Record high °C (°F)	37.3 (99.1)	36.3 (97.3)	35.9 (96.6)	29.5 (85.1)	25.0 (77.0)	19.5 (67.1)	19.5 (67.1)	21.0 (69.8)	26.4 (79.5)	29.0 (84.2)	33.3 (91.9)	35.3 (95.5)	37.3 (99.1)
Mean daily maximum °C (°F)	21.0 (69.8)	22.0 (71.6)	19.9 (67.8)	16.6 (61.9)	14.4 (57.9)	12.2 (54.0)	11.6 (52.9)	12.4 (54.3)	13.5 (56.3)	15.9 (60.6)	17.6 (63.7)	19.3 (66.7)	16.4 (61.5)
Mean daily minimum °C (°F)	8.3 (46.9)	8.6 (47.5)	7.6 (45.7)	6.5 (43.7)	4.5 (40.1)	2.7 (36.9)	2.4 (36.3)	3.1 (37.6)	4.0 (39.2)	5.1 (41.2)	6.4 (43.5)	7.9 (46.2)	5.6 (42.1)
Record low °C (°F)	0.0 (32.0)	0.0 (32.0)	−1.1 (30.0)	−2.6 (27.3)	−6.0 (21.2)	−6.2 (20.8)	−6.7 (19.9)	−5.5 (22.1)	−3.9 (25.0)	−3.3 (26.1)	−1.5 (29.3)	−0.6 (30.9)	−6.7 (19.9)
Average rainfall mm (inches)	149.9 (5.90)	98.8 (3.89)	147.2 (5.80)	211.3 (8.32)	241.4 (9.50)	212.7 (8.37)	268.6 (10.57)	267.5 (10.53)	248.5 (9.78)	209.9 (8.26)	183.7 (7.23)	168.7 (6.64)	2,408.2 (94.79)
Average rainy days (≥ 0.2 mm)	17.2	12.9	17.3	20.6	21.2	19.9	23.7	24.6	23.1	21.7	19.7	18.6	240.5
Average relative humidity (%)	60	60	65	72	76	77	77	73	71	64	63	63	68
Source: Bureau of Meteorology

=== Liawenee ===
Owing to its high altitude location on the Central Plateau of Tasmania, Liawenee is one of the few places in Australia with a subpolar oceanic climate (Köppen Cfc, bordering on very rare cold-summer mediterranean Csc).

Climate data for Liawenee
Month	Jan	Feb	Mar	Apr	May	Jun	Jul	Aug	Sep	Oct	Nov	Dec	Year
Record high °C (°F)	35.0 (95.0)	31.6 (88.9)	29.5 (85.1)	24.0 (75.2)	19.8 (67.6)	14.5 (58.1)	12.1 (53.8)	16.8 (62.2)	19.2 (66.6)	25.4 (77.7)	29.5 (85.1)	32.0 (89.6)	35.0 (95.0)
Mean daily maximum °C (°F)	18.6 (65.5)	18.7 (65.7)	16.2 (61.2)	12.7 (54.9)	9.2 (48.6)	6.2 (43.2)	5.5 (41.9)	6.4 (43.5)	9.1 (48.4)	11.9 (53.4)	14.7 (58.5)	17.0 (62.6)	12.2 (54.0)
Mean daily minimum °C (°F)	5.5 (41.9)	5.5 (41.9)	3.7 (38.7)	2.0 (35.6)	0.3 (32.5)	−1.1 (30.0)	−1.5 (29.3)	−1.8 (28.8)	−0.5 (31.1)	0.7 (33.3)	2.1 (35.8)	3.9 (39.0)	1.6 (34.9)
Record low °C (°F)	−4.0 (24.8)	−3.5 (25.7)	−5.0 (23.0)	−6.5 (20.3)	−8.9 (16.0)	−10.4 (13.3)	−12.2 (10.0)	−11.1 (12.0)	−7.7 (18.1)	−6.4 (20.5)	−5.6 (21.9)	−4.3 (24.3)	−12.2 (10.0)
Average precipitation mm (inches)	67.6 (2.66)	48.7 (1.92)	53.9 (2.12)	78.9 (3.11)	89.7 (3.53)	99.7 (3.93)	128.6 (5.06)	122.1 (4.81)	111.9 (4.41)	91.8 (3.61)	75.0 (2.95)	75.8 (2.98)	1,043.7 (41.09)
Average rainy days	12.9	10.2	13.4	17.1	18.8	20.3	23.0	22.5	19.9	18.4	15.8	14.3	206.6
Mean monthly sunshine hours	269.7	243.0	235.6	177.0	145.7	108.0	108.5	161.2	180.0	238.7	255.0	275.9	2,398.3
Source: Bureau of Meteorology

== See also ==
- Environment of Australia
