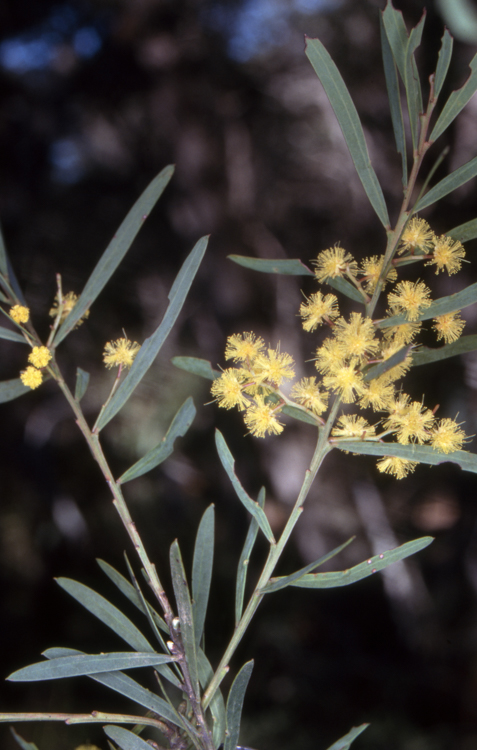
- In Wadbilliga National Park

Conservation status
- Least Concern (IUCN 3.1)

Scientific classification
- Kingdom: Plantae
- Clade: Embryophytes
- Clade: Tracheophytes
- Clade: Spermatophytes
- Clade: Angiosperms
- Clade: Eudicots
- Clade: Rosids
- Order: Fabales
- Family: Fabaceae
- Subfamily: Caesalpinioideae
- Clade: Mimosoid clade
- Genus: Acacia
- Species: A. kettlewelliae

Binomial name
- Acacia kettlewelliae Maiden
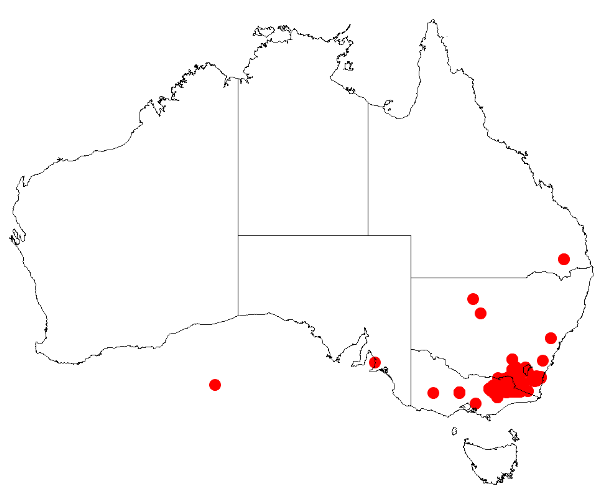
- Occurrence data from AVH

Synonyms
- ? Acacia oreophila Maiden & Blakely; ? Acacia oreophilla A.D.Chapm. orth. var.; ? Acacia walteri Maiden & Blakely; Racosperma kettlewelliae (Maiden) Pedley

= Acacia kettlewelliae =

Buffalo wattle

Species of legume

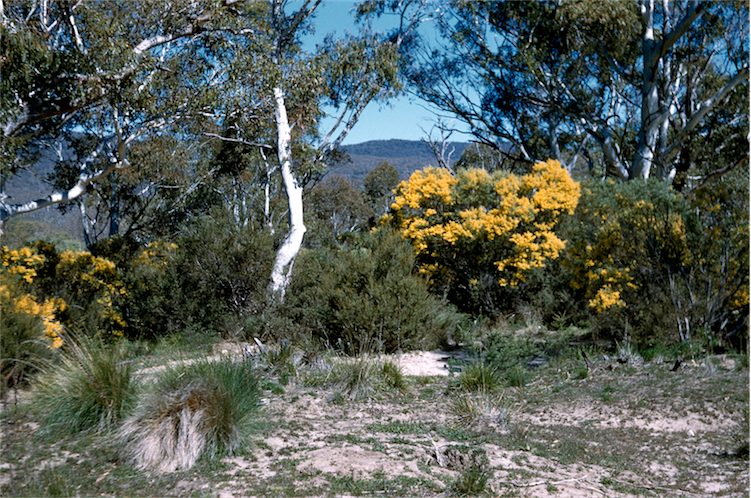
Habit near Jindabyne

Acacia kettlewelliae, commonly known as buffalo wattle, is a species of flowering plant in the family Fabaceae and is endemic to the south-east of continental Australia. It is a bushy shrub or tree with narrowly oblong, narrowly elliptic or narrowly lance-shaped phyllodes, spherical heads of bright, light golden yellow flowers, and firmly papery, oblong to egg-shaped pods.

== Description ==
Acacia kettlewelliae is a bushy shrub or tree that typically grows to a height of 2–10 m (6 ft 7 in – 32 ft 10 in) and has glabrous branchlets. Its phyllodes are narrowly oblong, narrowly elliptic or narrowly lance-shaped with the narrower end towards the base, usually 40–100 mm (1.6–3.9 in) long and 3–10 mm (0.12–0.39 in) wide on a raised stem-projection. The phyllodes are thin, green to glaucous and glabrous with one vein on each side and a downwards pointing gland usually 5–15 mm (0.20–0.59 in) above the pulvinus. The flowers are borne in spherical heads in many racemes mostly 10–70 mm (0.39–2.76 in) long and more or less glabrous, the heads on glabrous peduncles 2–4 mm (0.079–0.157 in) long, Each head usually has 8 to 11 bright, light golden yellow flowers. Flowering ocurs from September to December, and the pods are firmly papery, oblong to egg-shaped, straight or sometimes slightly curved and more or less flat, 30–110 mm (1.2–4.3 in) long and 7–14 mm (0.28–0.55 in) wide. The seeds are oblong to egg-shaped, 4–5 mm (0.16–0.20 in) long, and more or less dull black with a club-shaped aril.

== Taxonomy ==
Acacia kettlewelliae was first formally described in 1916 by Joseph Maiden in the Journal and Proceedings of the Royal Society of New South Wales from specimens collected between St. Bernard's Hospice and Harrietville by Richard Hind Cambage in 1913. The specific epithet (kettlewelliae) honours Agnes Louisa Kettlewell, who was the first honorary secretary of the Sydney branch of the Wattle Day League.

== Distribution and habitat ==
This species of wattle grows at higher altitudes in montane forest but also on lower slopes near streams, along the Great Dividing Range from around Tumut in New South Wales, south to Mount Buffalo and near Omeo in Victoria.

== See also ==
- List of Acacia species
