= Acacia mucronata =

Narrow-leaved wattle
- In the Australian National Botanic Gardens

Scientific classification
- Kingdom: Plantae
- Clade: Tracheophytes
- Clade: Angiosperms
- Clade: Eudicots
- Clade: Rosids
- Order: Fabales
- Family: Fabaceae
- Subfamily: Caesalpinioideae
- Clade: Mimosoid clade
- Genus: Acacia
- Species: A. mucronata

Binomial name
- Acacia mucronata Willd. ex H.L.Wendl.
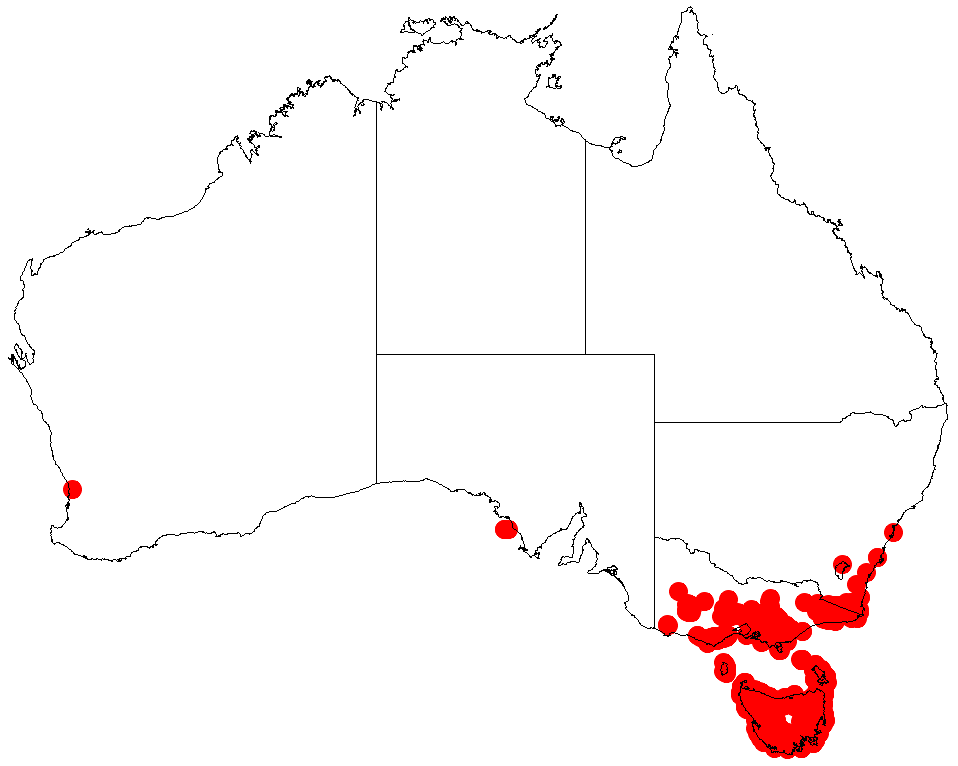
- Occurrence data from AVH

Synonyms
- Acacia longifolia var. mucronata F.Muell. nom. inval.; Acacia longifolia var. mucronata (Willd. ex H.L.Wendl.) Benth.; Acacia mucronata Willd. nom. inval., nom. nud.; Racosperma mucronatum (Willd. ex H.L.Wendl.) Pedley

Species of legume

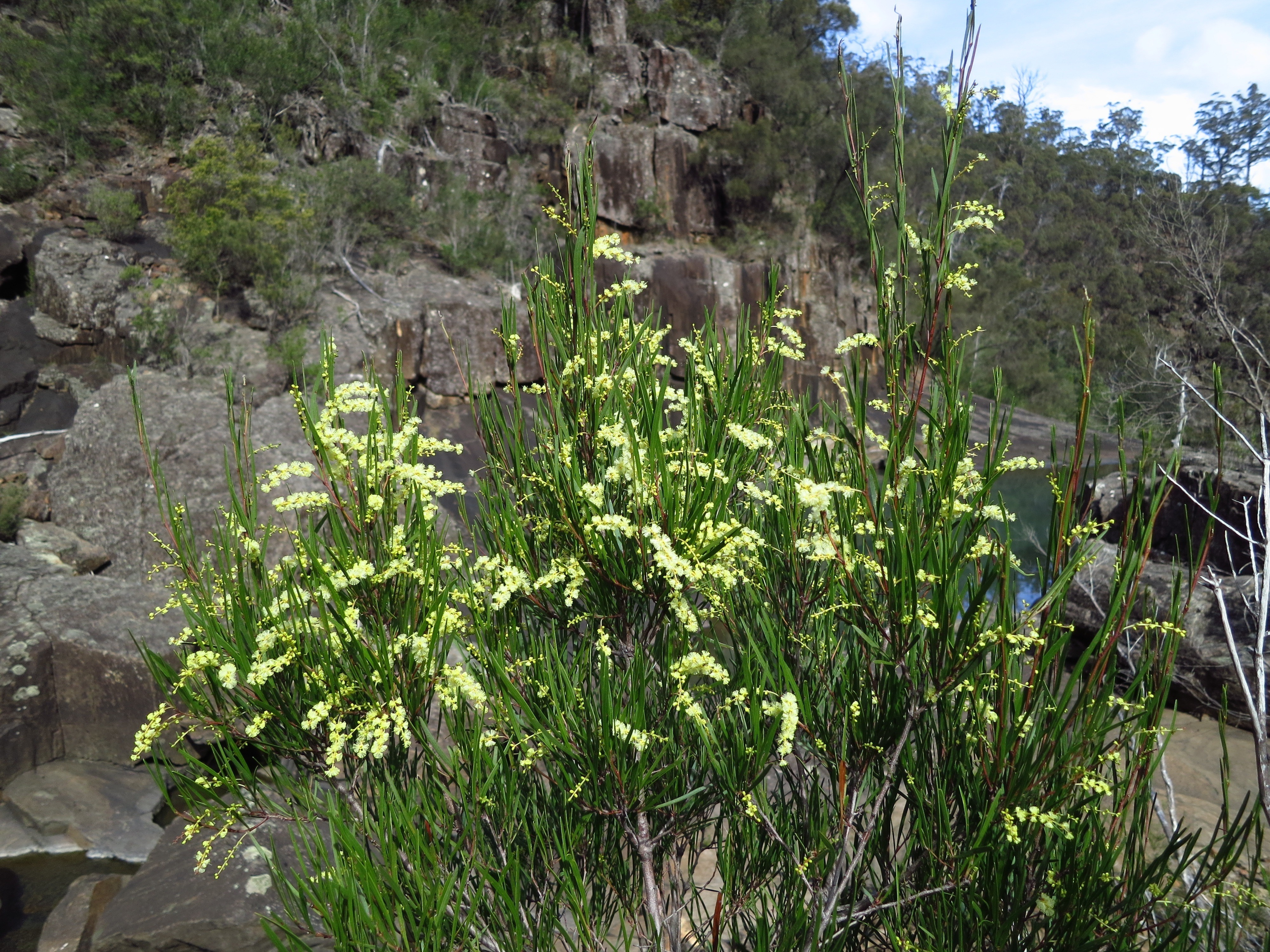
Habit at Hardings Falls, Tasmania

Acacia mucronata, commonly known as variable sallow wattle, variable sally, narrow-leaf wattle, or caterpillar wattle, is a species of flowering plant in the family Fabaceae, and is endemic to south-eastern Australia. It is a shrub or tree with narrowly linear, oblong or elliptic phyllodes, spikes of creamy white or pale yellow flowers, and linear pods, slightly constricted between the seeds.

== Description ==
Acacia mucronata is a shrub or tree that typically grows to a height of 1–15 m (3 ft 3 in – 49 ft 3 in) and 0.5–5 m (1 ft 8 in – 16 ft 5 in) wide. Its phyllodes are narrowly linear, oblong or elliptic, 20–200 mm (0.79–7.87 in) long and 1–10 mm (0.039–0.394 in) wide with a point on the end and with one to three promenent veins. The edges of the phyllodes are yellow, and there is a gland 6–25 mm (0.24–0.98 in) above the base of the phyllode. There is sometimes a minute stipule at the base of the phyllodes. The flowers are arranged in solitary or twinned spikes on peduncles less than 7 mm (0.28 in) long, the flowers interrupted along the spikes 10–60 mm (0.39–2.36 in) long. Flowering usually occurs from August to December, and the pods are linear, 60–120 mm (2.4–4.7 in) long and 2–5 mm (0.079–0.197 in) wide and slightly constricted between the seeds. The seeds are elliptic, 3–5 mm (0.12–0.20 in) long with a top-shaped aril.

== Taxonomy ==
Acacia mucronata was first formally described in 1820 by Carl Ludwig von Willdenow in his Commentatio de Acaciis aphyllis from an unpublished description by Heinrich Wendland. The specific epithet (mucronata) means mucronate.

In 2001, Arthur Bertram Court described three supspecies of A. mucronata, and the names are accepted by the Australian Plant Census:

- Acacia mucronata subsp. dependens (Hook.f.) Court, previously known as Acacia mucronata var. dependens Hook.f. has phyllodes mostly 15–65 mm (0.59–2.56 in) long, and 3–11 mm (0.12–0.43 in) wide and lack a gland.
- Acacia mucronata subsp. longifolia (Benth.) Court, previously known as Acacia mucronata var. longifolia Benth. has phyllodes mostly 90–200 mm (3.5–7.9 in) long, and a gland 6–25 mm (0.24–0.98 in) above the pulvinus.
- Acacia mucronata Willd. ex H.L.Wendl. subsp. mucronata has phyllodes mostly 50–80 mm (2.0–3.1 in) long, and 2–5 mm (0.079–0.197 in) wide and lack a gland.

== Distribution and habitat ==
This species of wattle is widespread from the far south-eastern New South Wales to western Victoria and Tasmania, usually in forests and woodlands.

- Subspecies dependens occurs in woodlands and montane regions, mainly in north-western, western and central Tasmania, where it sometimes forms dominant, closed forests, especially in the west of the state, including on King Island.
- Subspecies longifolia is confined to far south-eastern New South Wales and southern Victoria in forests and woodland of Eucalypts, usually south of the Great Dividing Range, and in north-central Tasmania.
- Subspecies mucronata occurs mainly in the woodland and forest of north-central, eastern, south-eastern and southern Tasmania, rarely in the southwest.
