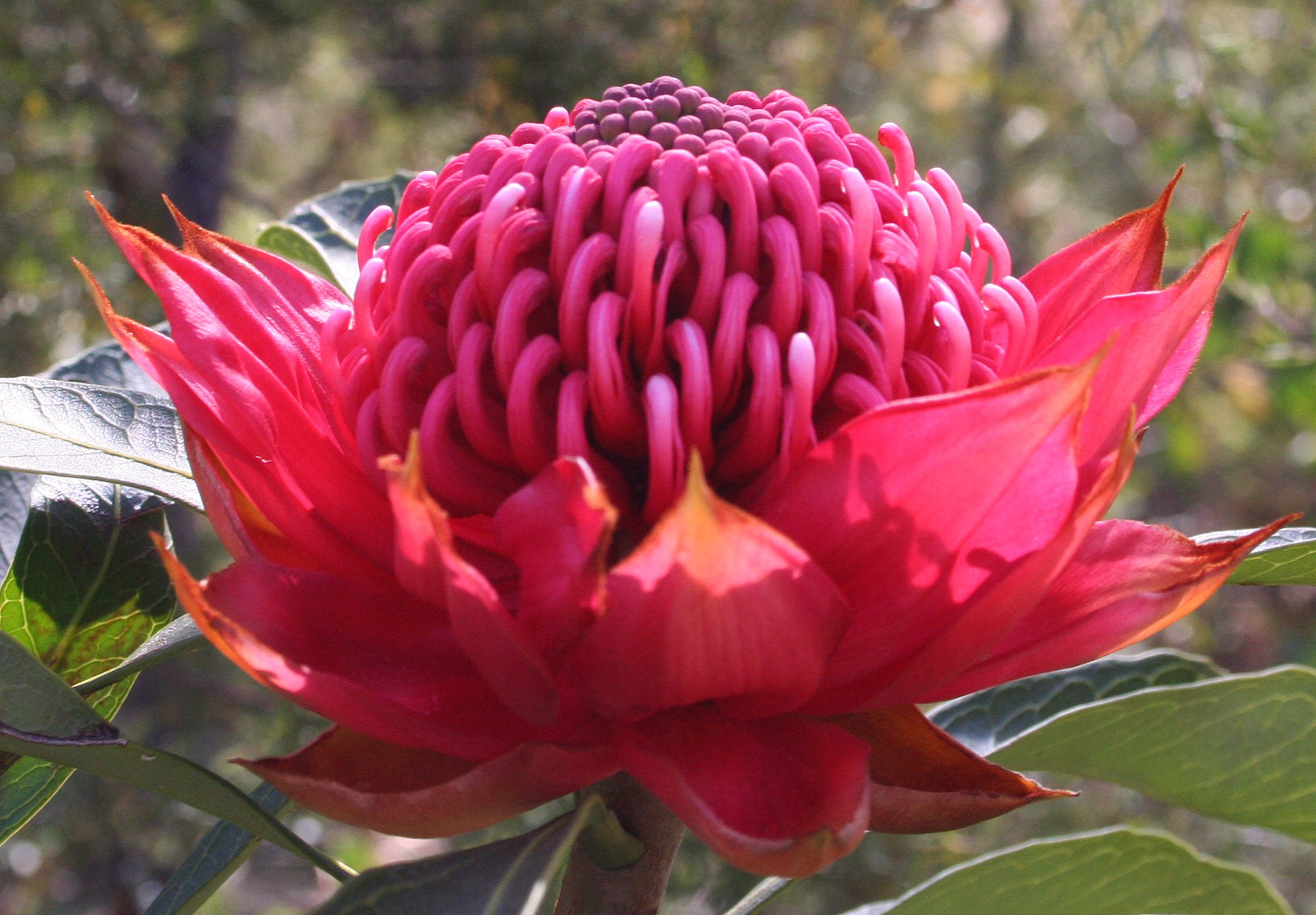
- Telopea speciosissima flowerhead with florets opening from the edges towards the centre, Blue Mountains, Australia

Scientific classification
- Kingdom: Plantae
- Clade: Tracheophytes
- Clade: Angiosperms
- Clade: Eudicots
- Order: Proteales
- Family: Proteaceae
- Genus: Telopea
- Species: T. speciosissima

Binomial name
- Telopea speciosissima (Sm.) R.Br.

Synonyms
- Embothrium speciosissimum (Sm.); Embothrium speciosissimum (Salisb. nom. illeg.); Hylogyne speciosa ((Salisb.) Salisb. ex Knight nom. illeg. nom. rej.)

= Telopea speciosissima =

Species of shrub endemic to New South Wales, Australia

Telopea speciosissima, commonly known as the New South Wales waratah or simply waratah, is a large shrub in the plant family Proteaceae. It is endemic to New South Wales in Australia. No subspecies are recognised; the closely related Telopea aspera was classified as a separate species in 1995. T. speciosissima is a shrub to 3 or 4 m (9.8 or 13.1 ft) high and 2 m (6.6 ft) wide, with dark green leaves. Its several stems arise from a pronounced woody base known as a lignotuber. The species is well renowned for its striking large red springtime inflorescences (flowerheads), each including hundreds of individual flowers. These are visited by the eastern pygmy possum (Cercartetus nanus), birds such as honeyeaters (Meliphagidae), and various insects.

The floral emblem for its home state of New South Wales, Telopea speciosissima has featured prominently in art, architecture, and advertising, particularly since Australian federation. Commercially grown in several countries as a cut flower, it is also cultivated in home gardens, requiring good drainage yet adequate moisture, but is vulnerable to various fungal diseases and pests. A number of cultivars with various shades of red, pink and even white flowers are available. Horticulturists have also developed hybrids with T. oreades and T. mongaensis which are more tolerant of cold, shade, and heavier soils.

== Description ==
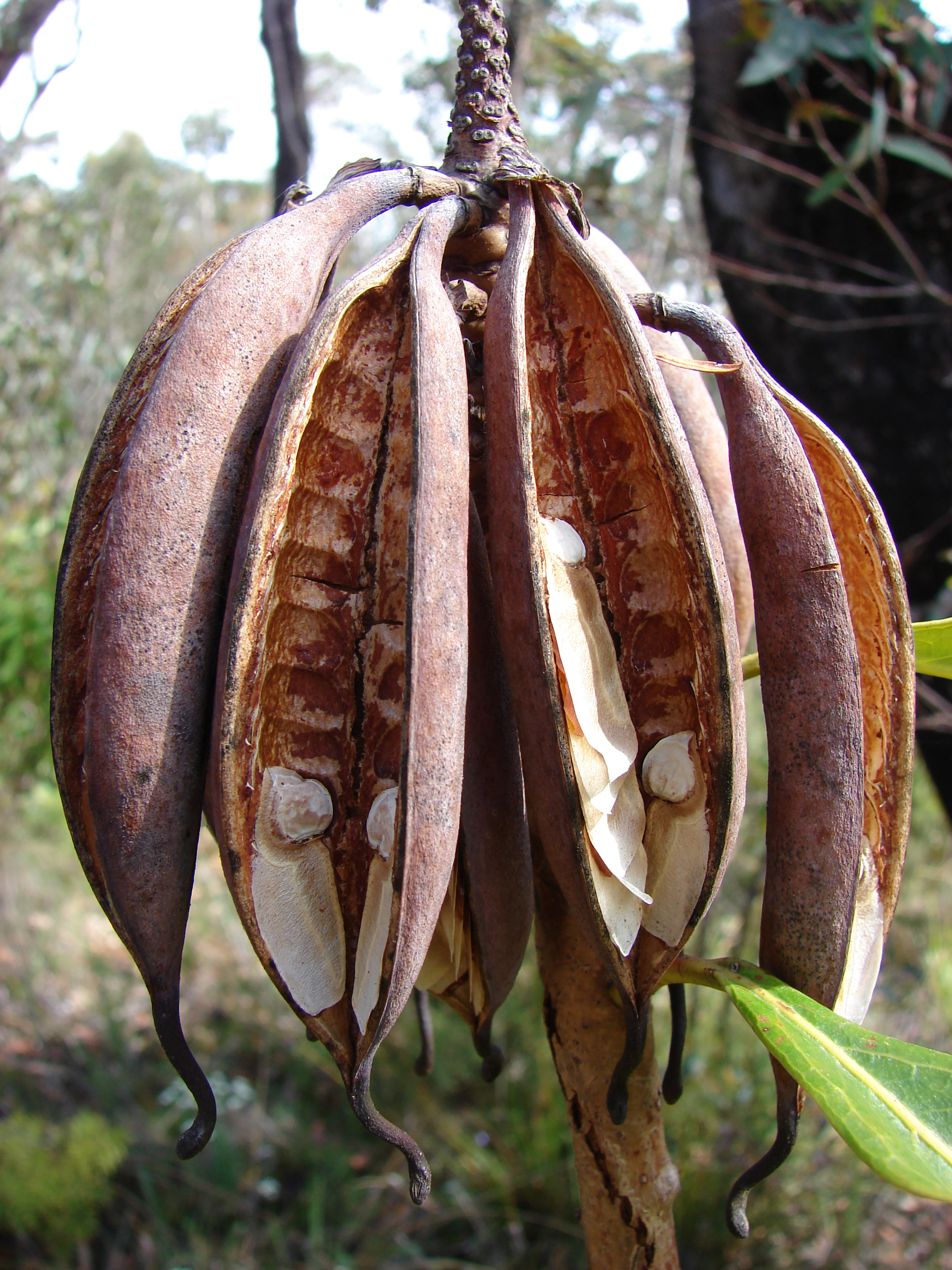
Seed pods containing several beige seeds at bottom

Telopea speciosissima, the New South Wales waratah, is a large, erect shrub up to 3 or 4 metres (9.8 or 13.1 ft) in height with one or more stems. Arising vertically or near vertically from a large woody base, or lignotuber, the stems are little branched. In late spring, there is a spurt of new growth after flowering, with new shoots often arising from old flowerheads. The dark green leaves are alternate and usually coarsely toothed, ranging from 13 to 25 cm (5 to 10 in) in length. Enveloped in leafy bracts, the flowerheads develop over the winter and begin to swell in early spring, before opening to reveal the striking inflorescences. The exact timing varies across New South Wales, but flowering can begin as early as August in the northern parts of its range, and finish in November in the southern, more elevated areas. Spot flowering may also occur around March in autumn. Containing up to 250 individual flowers, the domed flowerheads are crimson in colour and measure 7–10 cm (3–4 in) in diameter. They are cupped in a whorl of leafy bracts which are 5 to 7 cm (2 to 3 in) long and also red. Variations are not uncommon; some flowerheads may be more globular or cone-shaped than dome-shaped, and the bracts may be whitish or dark red. The tips of the stigmas of some inflorescences may be whitish, contrasting with the red colour of the rest of the flowerhead.

An individual flowerhead reaches full size about two weeks after first emerging from the bracts, and lasts another two weeks before the flowers fade and fall. In the first phase, the individual small flowers, known as florets, remain unopened—and the flowerhead retains a compact shape—before they mature and split open, revealing the stigma, style, and anther. The anther is sessile, lacking a filament, and lies next to the stigma at the end of the style. The outermost florets open first, with anthesis progressing towards the centre of the flowerhead, which becomes darker and more open in appearance, and begins attracting birds and insects. The ovary lies at the base of the style and atop a stalk known as the gynophore, and it is from here that the seed pods then develop. Meanwhile, a crescent-shaped nectary lies at the base of the gynophore.

The seed pods grow to 8–15 cm (3–6 in) long. As the pods mature, they range from green, to yellow and finally turn russet red-brown. The pods become leathery before splitting open during early winter. The pods contain winged seeds inside. In the wild, only two or three seed pods develop per flowerhead, but there may be anywhere from 5 to 50 in cultivated plants.

== Taxonomy ==
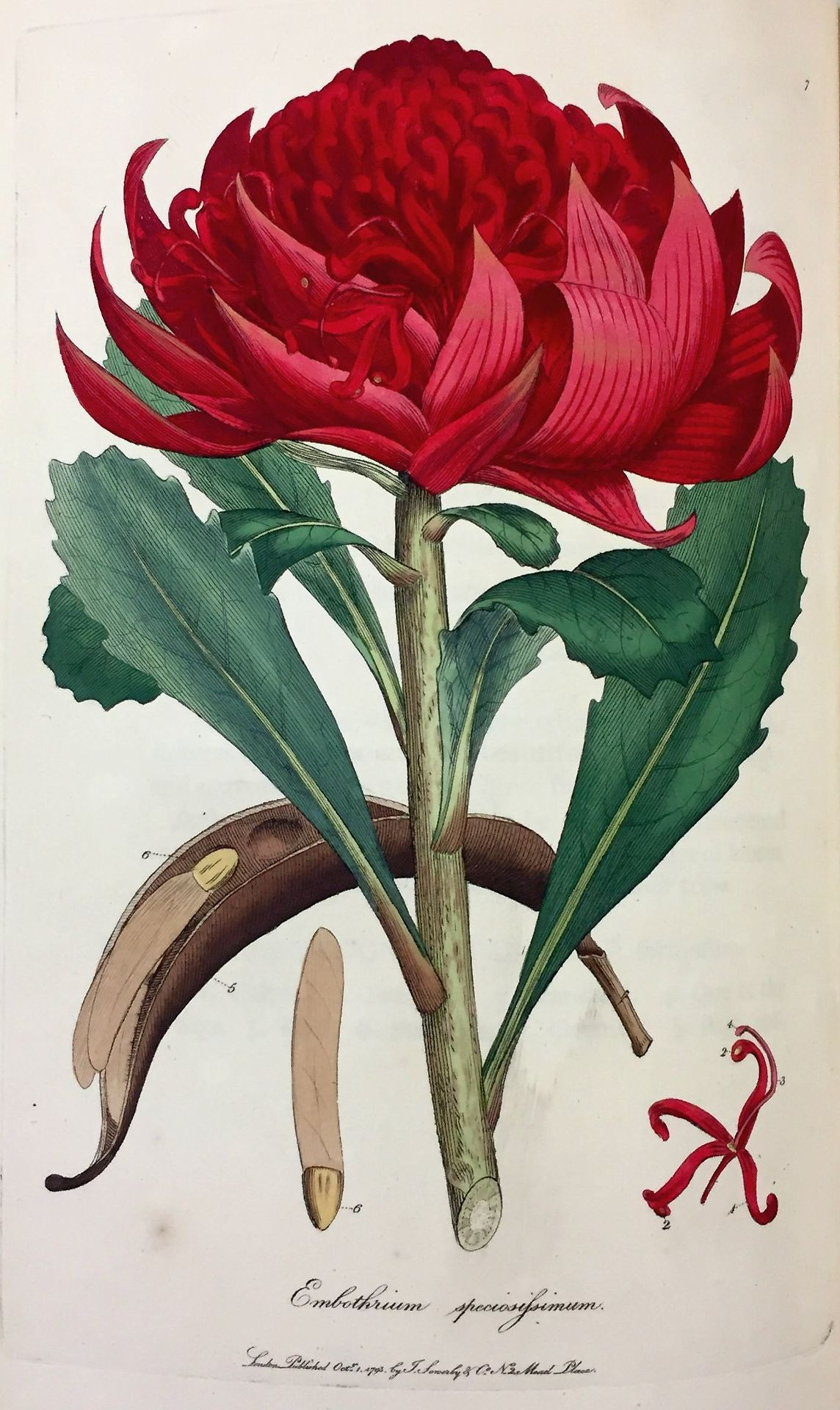
Hand-coloured engraving of Telopea speciosissima by James Sowerby from A Specimen of the Botany of New Holland

Telopea speciosissima, the New South Wales Waratah, was first described by botanist James Edward Smith in his 1793 book A Specimen of the Botany of New Holland, from "very fine dried specimens sent by Mr. White". He gave the species its original binomial name of Embothrium speciosissimum. The specific epithet is derived from the superlative of the Latin word specious 'beautiful, handsome', hence 'very-' or 'most beautiful'. Embothrium had been a wastebasket taxon at the time, and Robert Brown suggested the genus Telopea for it in 1809, which was published in 1810. Richard Salisbury had published the name Hylogyne speciosa in 1809, but Brown's name was nomenclaturally conserved.

Telopea speciosissima is one of five species from southeastern Australia which make up the genus Telopea. Its closest relative is the very similar Gibraltar Range waratah (T. aspera) from northern New South Wales, which was only recognised as a separate species in 1995, having previously been considered an unusual northern population of T. speciosissima.

The genus is classified in the subtribe Embothriinae of the Proteaceae, along with the tree waratahs (Alloxylon) from eastern Australia and New Caledonia, and Oreocallis and the Chilean firetree (Embothrium coccineum) from South America. Almost all these species have red terminal flowers, and hence the subtribe's origin and floral appearance must predate the splitting of Gondwana into Australia, Antarctica, and South America over 60 million years ago.

Although no subspecies are recognised within Telopea speciosissima itself, geographical variations within its range have been noted. Forms toward the northern limits of its range have more prominently lobed leaves. A population from Waterfall has darker red, wider inflorescences, and a population at West Head in Ku-ring-gai Chase National Park has paler inflorescences. Leaf shape varies widely.

The common name waratah was first applied to this species before being generalised to other members of the genus Telopea and, to a lesser extent, Alloxylon. Waratah is derived from the Eora Aboriginal people, the original inhabitants of the Sydney area. The Dharawal people of the Illawarra region knew it as mooloone, and mewah is another aboriginal name. A former common name from around 1900 is "native tulip", possibly derived from Telopea.

== Distribution and habitat ==
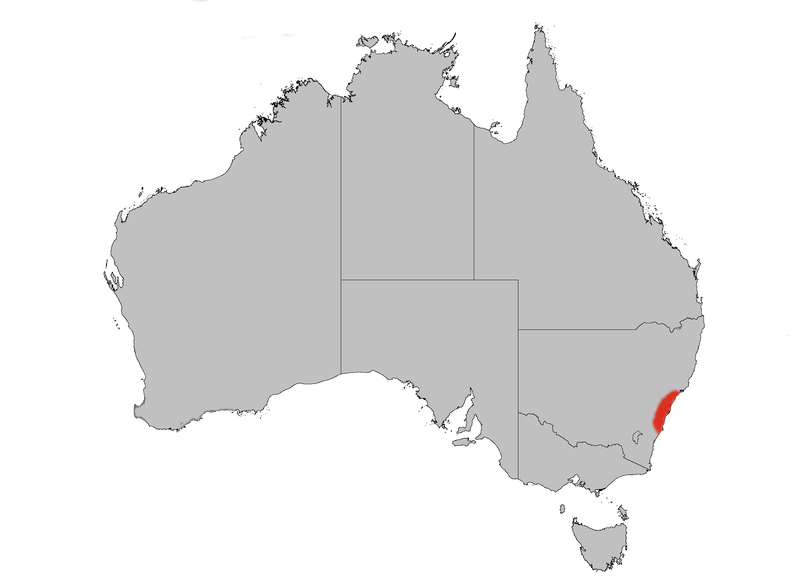
Distribution of Telopea speciosissima (highlighted in red) within Australia

The species is found in New South Wales (Australia) from the Watagan Mountains southward to Ulladulla, with a relatively widespread distribution in the Central Coast region. It usually occurs as an understory shrub in open forest on sandy soils in areas with moderately high rainfall, receiving on average around 1,200 mm (47 in) a year. Dappled shade from eucalyptus (Eucalyptus) trees reduces sunlight by around 30%. Much of its range occurs in the Sydney Basin, an area with one of the highest human populations and most intense development in Australia. The impact of habitat fragmentation and decreased fire interval (time between bushfires) on the gene pool of Telopea speciosissima, which relies on outcrossing, is unclear. Although largely protected within National Parks and conservation reserves in the Sydney area, most populations are small, numbering under 200 plants, and are often located near urban developments.

== Ecology ==
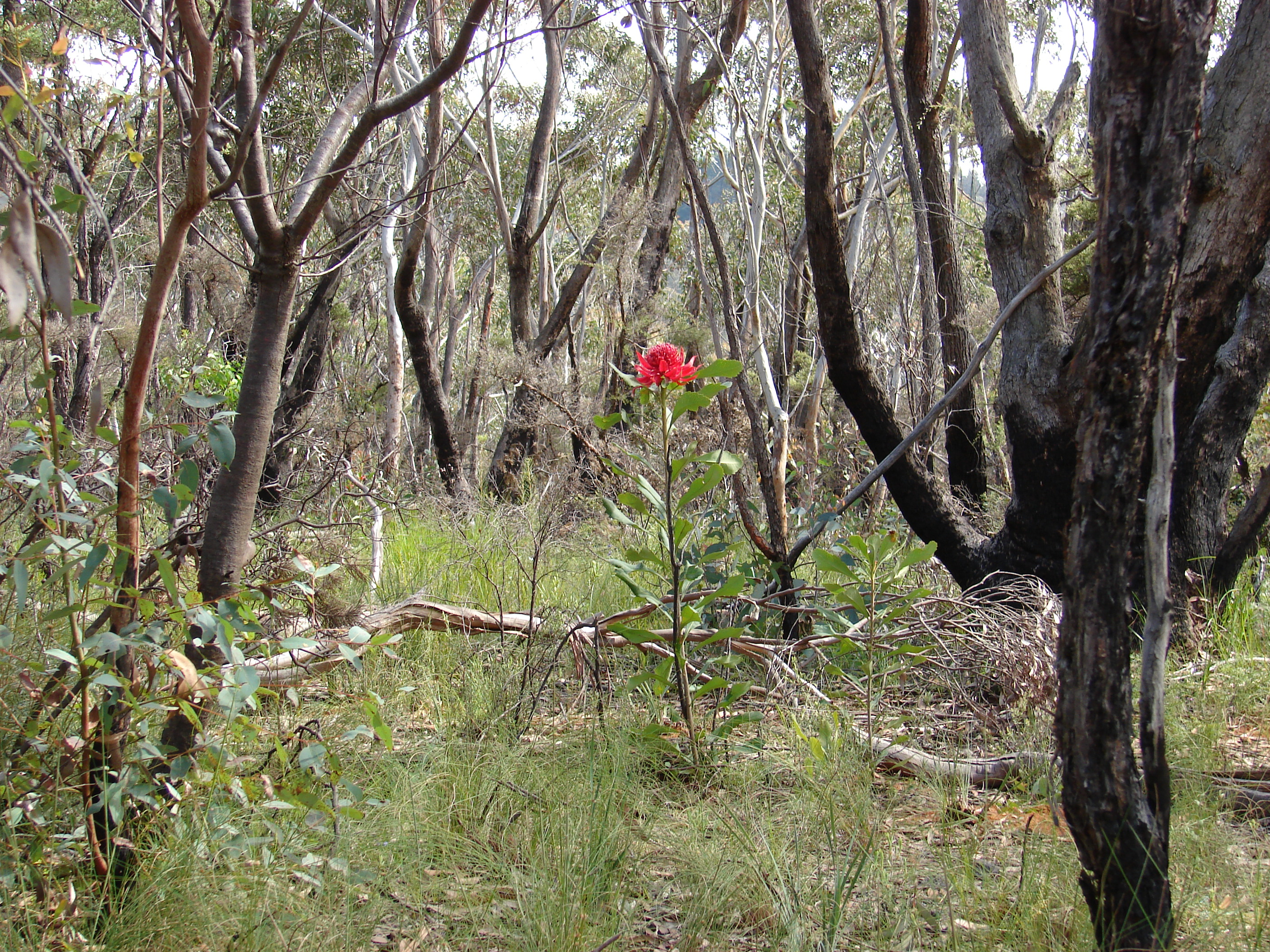
Waratah in flower in bushland, regenerating from fire in recent years, dominant above slower-growing understory plants

Telopea speciosissima is a pyrogenic-flowering species, relying on post-fire flowering followed by production and dispersal of non-dormant seeds to take advantage of favourable growing conditions in the altered environment following a fire. Of the woody resprouter species of southeastern Australia, it is one of the slowest to produce seedlings after bushfires, taking at least two years. The species resprouts from a lignotuber, a swollen woody base largely under the soil, that stores energy and nutrients as a resource for rapid growth of new shoots after a bushfire. Waratahs dominate the understorey around two years after a fire, but are later overtaken by the slower-growing banksias (Banksia) and wattles (Acacia). Fire also serves to strip away diseases and pests. Flowering may be prolific at this time.

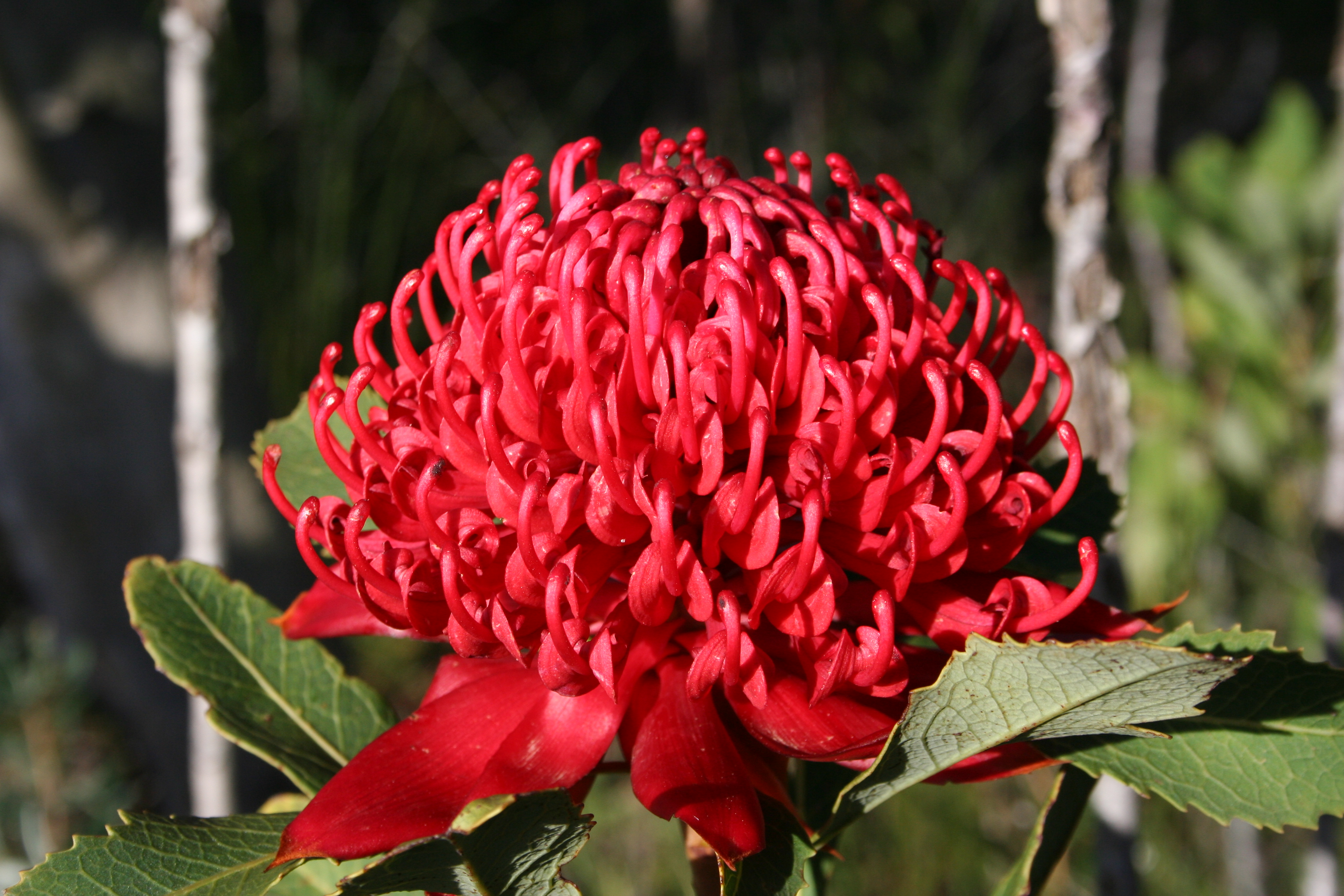
Fully mature flowerheads with opened florets, like this specimen from the Royal National Park, attract many animals.

The prominent position and striking colour of Telopea speciosissima and many of its relatives within the subtribe Embothriinae both in Australia and South America strongly suggest it is adapted to pollination by birds, and has been for over 60 million years. Honeyeaters, in particular the New Holland honeyeater (Phylidonyris novaehollandiae) and the crescent honeyeater (P. pyrrhopterus), are frequent visitors. However, a field study conducted at Barren Grounds showed New Holland honeyeaters to carry relatively little pollen. The eastern pygmy possum (Cercartetus nanus) also forages among the flowerheads.

The New South Wales waratah had been considered to be protandrous (that is, with male parts concluding sexual activity before female parts become receptive on the same plant), but analysis of the timing of pollen viability and stigma receptivity has shown significant overlaps. The species has been shown to be self-incompatible, requiring cross-pollination with plants of other genotypes to reproduce successfully.

== Cultivation ==
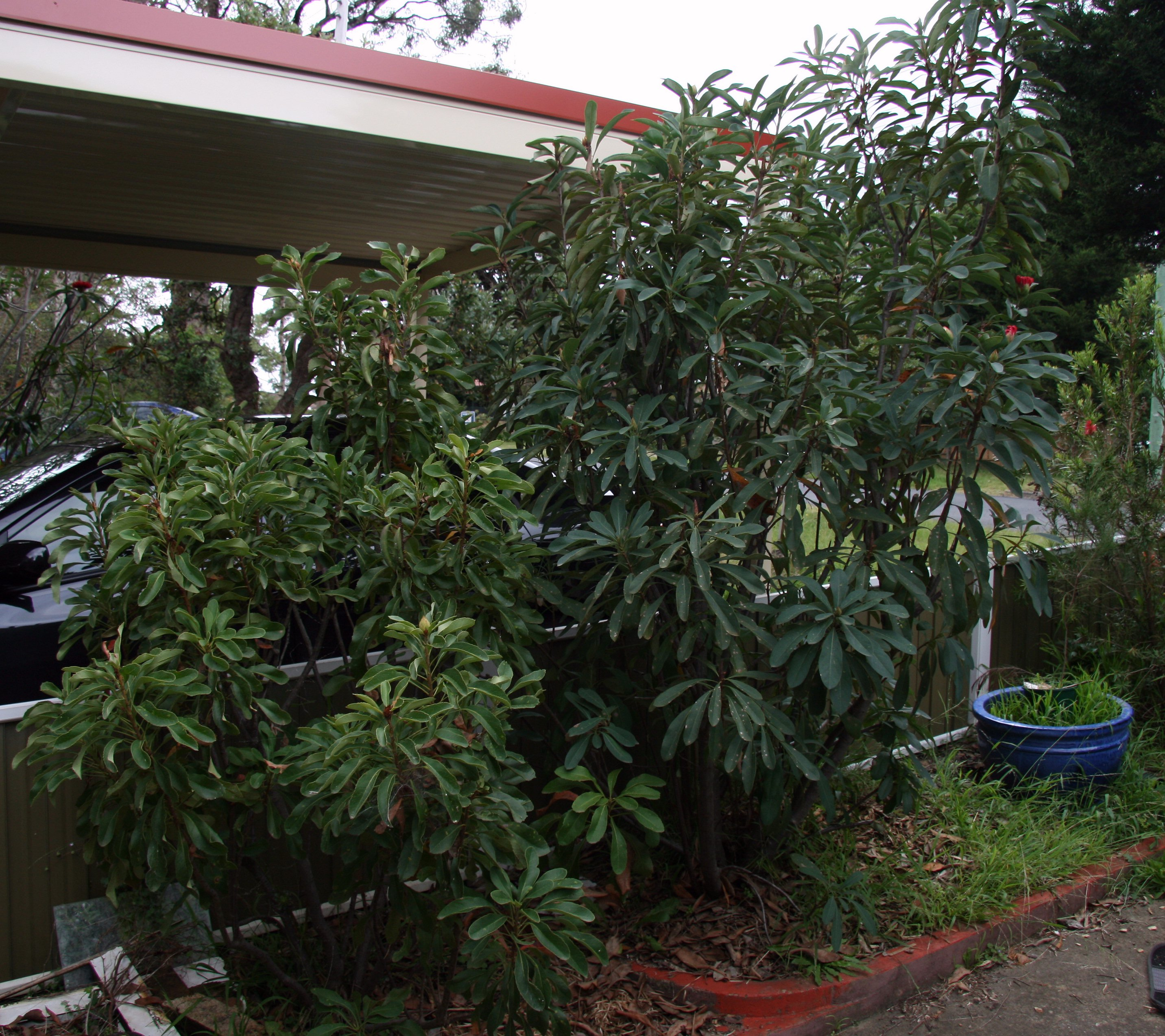
In cultivation, Telopea speciosissima on left next to larger more vigorous T. 'Shady Lady' at right

The New South Wales waratah was a popular garden plant at the beginning of the 20th century. It had been introduced early (1789) into the United Kingdom, and was reported flowering for the first time in 1809 at Springwell, the villa of one E. J. A. Woodford Esq. The Royal Horticultural Society awarded it an Award of Merit in 1914, and a First Class Certificate in 1922.

Initially, waratahs were picked from the bushland for market, but by the early 20th century, a few plantsmen grew concerned at the development of urban areas at the expense of bush, particularly areas noted for wildflowers. Percy Parry of Floralands in Kariong developed the idea of "Preservation by Cultivation" and investigated the commercial cultivation of waratahs and other native plants. Meanwhile, the New South Wales Government was looking to curb flower and plant collecting from the wild, and considered prohibition in 1944, but after witnessing the ability of Parry to manage and develop cultivation, introduced compulsory licences for wildflower collecting the following year. With his wife Olive, Percy promoted and developed knowledge over fifty years and received the Order of Australia medal in 1981. Following on from the Parrys were Howard Gay and Arch Dennis, who pioneered growing waratahs at Monbulk in the Dandenong Ranges in the 1940s, Sid Cadwell and Frank Stone, who did likewise in Dural and the Blue Mountains respectively. The growing movement for cultivating and preserving native plants led to the establishment of the Society for Growing Australian Plants in 1957, and the waratah was featured heavily in the first edition of its journal Australian Plants.

Today, New South Wales waratahs are grown commercially in Australia north of Sydney and in the Dandenong Ranges near Melbourne. They are also grown commercially in New Zealand and in Israel, and also in Hawaii, where they have been grown since 1961. One major challenge in commercial production is that in any one location the flowering season is generally short (five weeks total, with only small numbers in the earliest and latest weeks). The season for cut flowers may be extended, however, by growing plants at different latitudes. The vase life of a cut waratah is 10 to 14 days, and cut flower waratahs can be revived somewhat by water.

Although they grow naturally on deep sandy soils, the species has proved adaptable to other deep, well-drained soils, especially where natural slopes assist drainage. Despite their natural occurrence in woodland, waratahs flower best in full sun, although they tolerate the dappled shade of eucalyptus. Heavy pruning after flowering reinvigorates the plants and promotes more profuse flowering in the next season. Waratah blooms are highly susceptible to damage from wind, and benefit from some protection from prevailing winds. Waratah blooms attract birds to the garden. The species is readily propagated from fresh seed, but cultivars must be reproduced from cuttings to remain true-to-type.

Several species of fungi infect the roots of waratahs, causing significant plant morbidity or death. Typical symptoms include yellow leaves, wilting, blackening and dieback or part or all of the plant, or lack of proteoid roots. The most common pathogen is the soil-borne water mold Phytophthora cinnamomi, which appears to be more problematic in cultivated plants than in wild populations. Mass plantings at the Royal Botanic Gardens in Sydney and at Mount Annan planted before the 2000 Summer Olympics were devastated by the disease. Rhizoctonia solani can cause damping off or root rot, and is an uncommon pathogen. Cylindrocarpon scoparium and C. destructans (now Nectria radicicola) are also uncommon causes of infection and result in decay of the crown of the plant. Although significant problems, fungi are less likely to be the cause of plant morbidity than poor drainage or soil conditions.

The larvae of the Macadamia leafminer (Acrocercops chionosema), a moth, burrow along and disfigure the waratah's leaves, and are mainly a problem in lowering the value of cut flower crops. More problematic is the larger caterpillar of another moth, the Macadamia twig girdler (Xylorycta luteotactella) which can burrow into and disfigure the developing flowerhead.

=== Cultivars ===
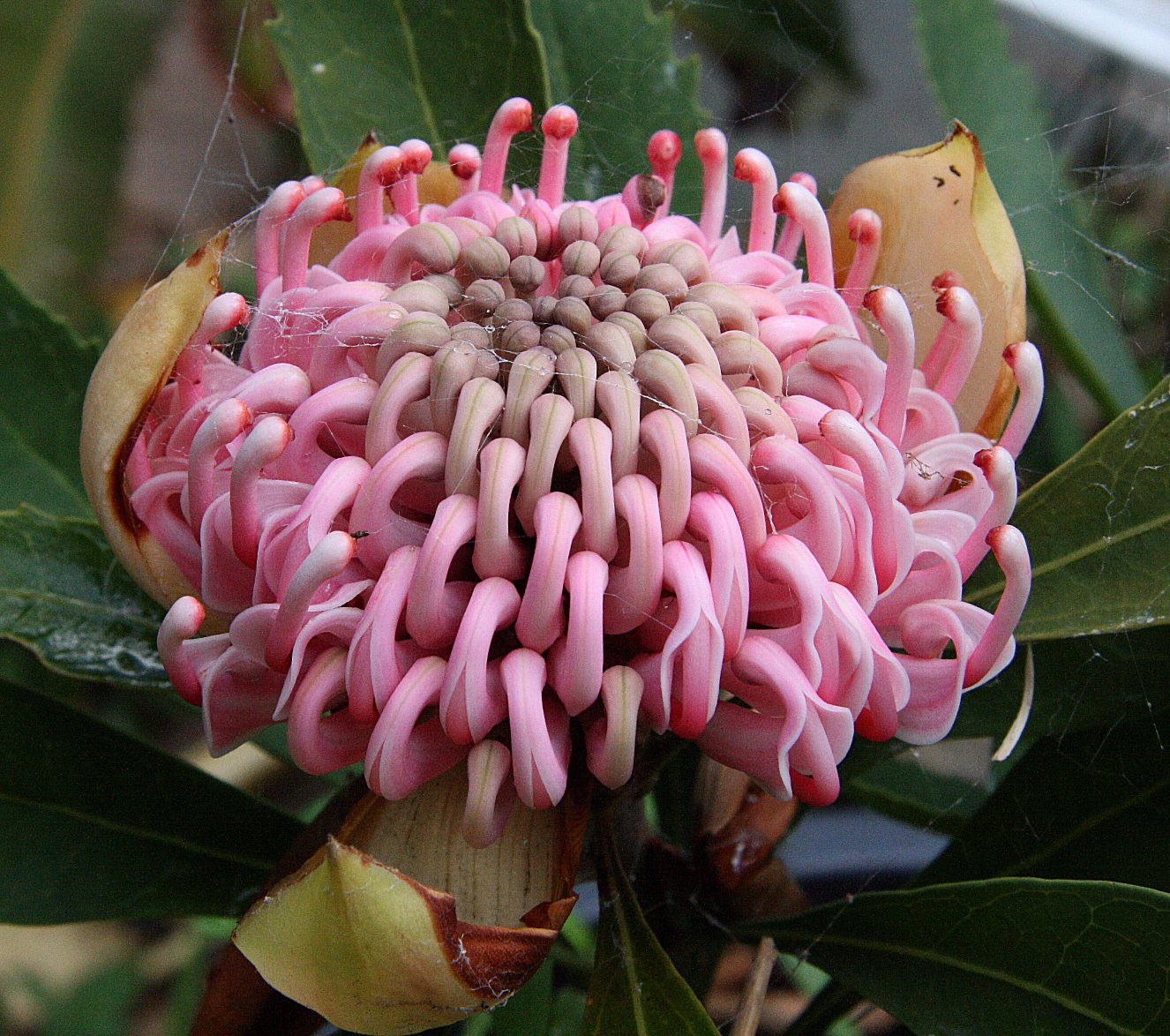
Telopea 'Shade of Pale'

A number of natural variants of Telopea speciosissima have been selected for cultivation as follows:

- Telopea 'Brimstone Blush' is a shrub of smaller size than the species, reaching a metre (3 ft) tall, and was originally found growing on a property of Ben Richards in Oakdale, southwest of Sydney. Flowering takes place in October. The flowerhead is globular with a pink crown and has 160 individual flowers, the styles of which are pink and white towards the ends. Three rows of whorled dark red bracts surround the flowerheads.
- Telopea 'Cardinal' is a form originally found on the property of Lucille Pope in Werombi, from where it was propagated and made available commercially. The original plant was a vigorous specimen reaching 3 by 3 m (9.8 by 9.8 ft) and producing 100 to 120 flowerheads each year. It is named for its large dome-shaped cardinal red flowerheads, which bear 210 individual flowers and are surrounded by two rows of dark red bracts. These blooms have long vase life.
- Telopea 'Corroboree', a form with longer styles, has compact inflorescences measuring 12 cm (4.5 in) high and wide, and is a vigorous grower. It was selected for commercial propagation in 1974 by Nanette Cuming of Bittern, Victoria, and registered with the Australian Cultivar Registration Authority in 1989. It is grown principally for the cut flower industry.
- Telopea 'Fire and Brimstone' is a vigorous form with large inflorescences selected by waratah grower and author Paul Nixon of Camden, New South Wales. It is a shrub which may reach 3–4 m tall and 2 m wide, with large leaves with more heavily toothed margins. Each flowerhead is cone-shaped and has up to 240 florets. The stigmas are a light red and tipped with white. The bracts surrounding the flowerheads are relatively small, while the leaves are large and can reach 44 cm (17.5 in) in length. The cultivar is thought to be tetraploid. With a long vase life of 17 days, the cultivar is suitable for the cut flower industry.
- Telopea 'Galaxy' has flowerheads with pinkish red tepals and white tips to the styles, surrounded by large bracts.
- Telopea 'Olympic Flame' is a form with prominent bracts around the flowerheads. It has large leaves with toothed margins and flowers in early spring. Also known as 'Sunburst', it arose as a seedling in a breeding program conducted by Cathy Offord, Peter Goodwin and Paul Nixon under the auspices of the University of Sydney.
- Telopea 'Parry's Dream' was a chance seedling in the early 1970s. It gave rise to this cultivar, a vigorous plant with red-pink flowerheads which reach a diameter of 10 cm × 10 cm (4 in × 4 in) surrounded by pink bracts.
- Telopea 'Shade of Pale' is an unusual pale-pink flowered form of T. speciosissima. It is less vigorous than the parent plant. It was initially promoted as 'Light Shade of Pale' but there can only be three words in a registered cultivar name.
- Telopea 'Sunflare' is an early-flowering form. It has large leaves with toothed margins and flowers in early spring. It also arose as a seedling in the same breeding program by the University of Sydney mentioned above. Selected in 1981, it has red flowerheads with white-tipped styles which reach 9 cm (3.5 in) in diameter.

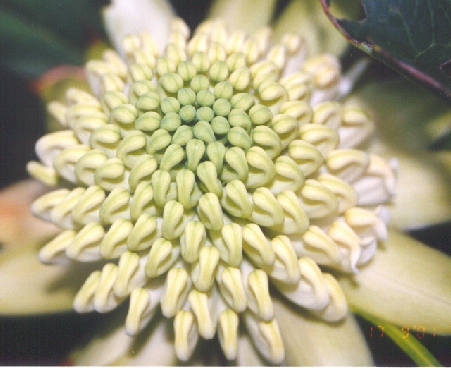
Telopea 'Wirrimbirra White'

- Telopea 'Wirrimbirra White' is a white form from Kangaloon near Robertson. Aboriginal legends of white waratahs existed, and several had been encountered, but none had been previously preserved in horticulture. Joseph Maiden had previously found a white waratah near Kurrajong, and others had been sighted near Narara on the Central Coast in 1919, and Colo Vale in the 1950s. Horticulturalist Frank Stone reported one in his garden, possibly propagated from the latter plant. 'Wirrimbirra White' was brought into cultivation in 1972 by cuttings from the original plant, which grew on water catchment property. It has pale greenish buds which open to a cream-white inflorescence. It is less vigorous than the parent species and vulnerable to borers. It is also highly vulnerable to the Macadamia twig girdler.

In addition, a number of interspecific Telopea hybrids have also been produced. These have been bred or used as more frost- or shade-tolerant plants in cooler climates such as Canberra, Melbourne or elsewhere.

- Telopea 'Braidwood Brilliant' is a frost-tolerant hybrid between a male T. speciosissima and female T. mongaensis. Dr Boden of the Canberra Parks Administration began investigating this hybrid in 1962, and it was registered in 1975 by Richard Powell. It is a lignotuberous shrub to 3 m (9.8 ft) high and has oblanceolate leaves to 20 cm (8 in) long. The red blooms are 6–8 cm (2.5–3 in) in diameter, intermediate in size between the parent species. It has grown well in cooler climates such as Canberra.

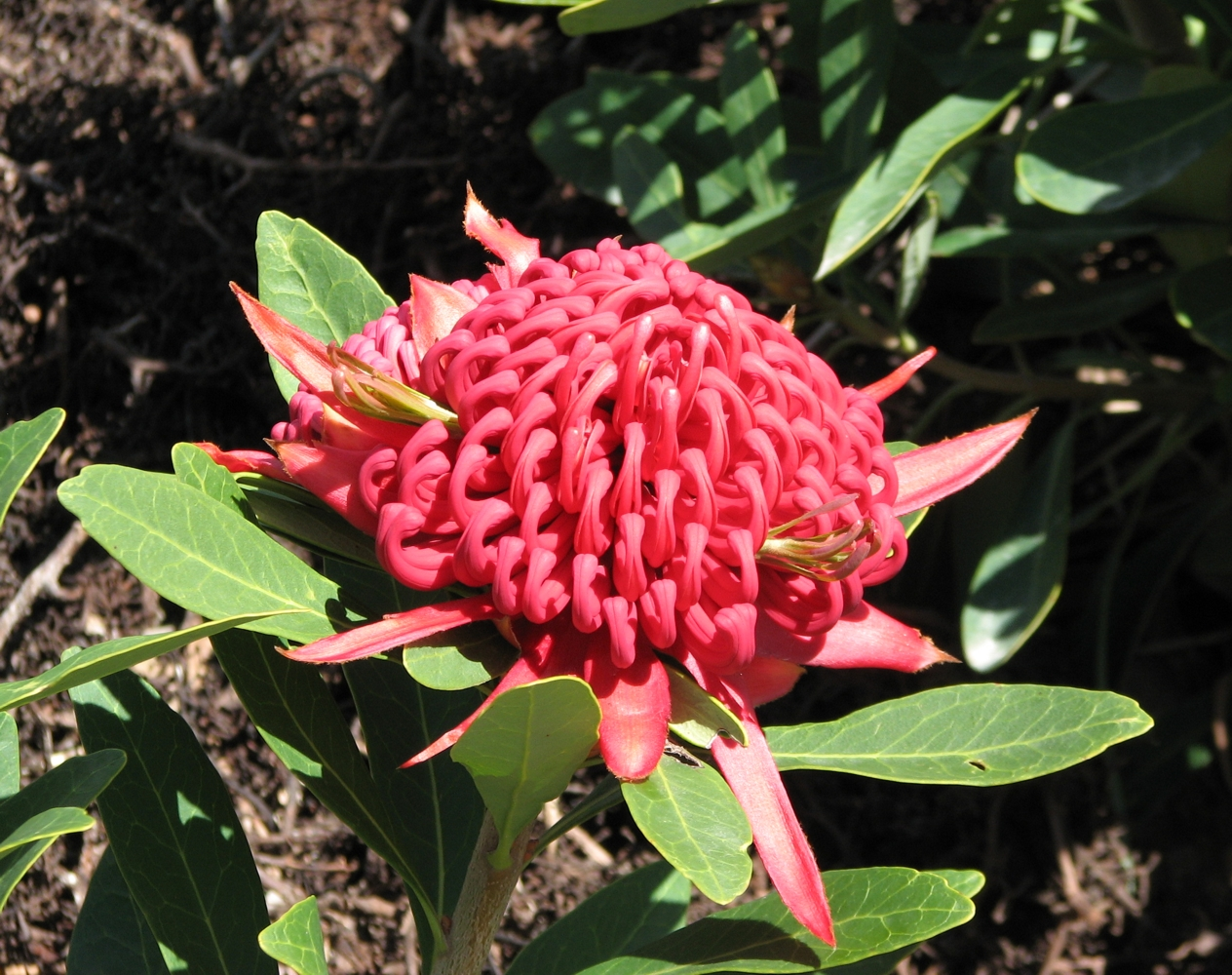
Telopea 'Braidwood Brilliant'

- Telopea 'Canberry Coronet' is a cross between T. speciosissima from Wentworth Falls in the Blue Mountains and T. mongaensis intended for increased cold tolerance. It has red flowerheads to 6–8 cm (2.5–3 in) in diameter. Reaching 3–4 m (9.8–13.1 ft) high, it is a larger plant than 'Braidwood Brilliant'. It was bred by Doug Verdon of the Australian National Botanic Gardens in Canberra.
- Telopea 'Champagne' is a cultivar registered under Plant Breeders Rights (PBR) in 2006. Its creamy yellow flowerheads appear from October to December. It is a three-way hybrid between T. speciosissima, T. oreades and the yellow-flowered form of T. truncata.
- Telopea 'Golden Globe' is a cultivar registered under PBR in 2006. Larger than 'Champagne', it is also a three-way hybrid between T. speciosissima, T. oreades and the yellow-flowered form of T. truncata. It has been propagated and sold as 'Shady Lady Yellow'. It was originally bred in the Dandenongs east of Melbourne.
- Telopea 'Shady Lady' is a larger shrub which may reach 5 m (16 ft) high and 2 or 3 m (6.6 or 9.8 ft) wide. A hybrid of T. speciosissima and T. oreades, it arose by chance in a Melbourne garden. The flowerheads are smaller and lack the bracts of the speciosissima parent. As its name suggests, it tolerates more shade. It is vigorous and more reliable in temperate and subtropical areas, and grows in semi-shade or sun. 'Shady Lady Crimson', 'Shady Lady Red' and 'Shady Lady Pink' are three selected commercially available colour forms.
- Telopea 'Shady Lady White' is a white hybrid between T. speciosissima and T. oreades.

== Symbolic and artistic references ==
The New South Wales waratah featured prominently in the folklore of the Darug and Tharawal people in the Sydney basin and Gandangara people to the southwest. A dreamtime legend from the Eora tells of a female wonga pigeon searching for her husband who has been lost while out hunting. A hawk attacks and wounds her, and she hides in a waratah bush. Her husband calls and as she struggles in the bush her blood turns the white waratah blooms red. A tale from the Burragorang Valley tells of a beautiful maiden named Krubi, who wore a red cloak of rock wallaby adorned with the feathers of the gang-gang cockatoo. She fell in love with a young warrior who did not return from battle. Grief-stricken, she died, and up from the ground grew the first waratah. The Dharawal people regarded it as a totem, using it in ceremonies and timing ceremonies to its flowering.

The striking form of the New South Wales waratah became a popular motif in Australian art in the late nineteenth and early twentieth century and was incorporated in Art Nouveau designs of the time. Matchboxes, paperweights and especially tins have been decorated with the flower. Arnott's often used the waratah as an alternative to their parrot logo on biscuit and cake tins from the early 1900s. Shelleys soft drinks, established in 1893 in Broken Hill, also displayed it on their label. The French artist Lucien Henry, who had settled in Sydney in 1879, was a strong proponent of a definitive Australian art style incorporating local flora, particularly the waratah. His most famous surviving work is a triptych stained glass window of Oceania flanked by numerous waratahs overlooking the Centennial Hall in Sydney Town Hall. In 1925, artist Margaret Preston produced a hand-coloured woodcut depicting waratahs. The species also appeared on an Australian 3 shilling stamp in 1959 designed by botanical illustrator Margaret Jones and a 30c stamp in 1968.

The Sydney suburb of Telopea takes its name from the Waratah, as does the Newcastle suburb of Waratah. The state's Sydney-based Super Rugby team is known as the New South Wales Waratahs, with a red waratah badge first added to their jerseys in 1895. One of Sydney's first rugby union clubs in the early 1870s was the Waratah FC, one of the co-founders of the NSWRU in 1874.

After Australian federation in 1901, the upsurge in nationalism led to the search for an official national floral emblem. The New South Wales waratah was considered alongside the wattle Acacia pycnantha, and debate raged between proponents of the two flowers. The economist and botanist Richard Baker proposed that the waratah's endemism to the Australian continent made it a better choice than the wattle, as well as the prominence of its flowers. He was nicknamed the "Commander in Chief of the Waratah Armed Forces". The South Australian Evening News also supported the bid, but to no avail.

Decades later, in 1962, Telopea speciosissima was proclaimed as the official floral emblem of New South Wales by the Governor of New South Wales, Eric Woodward, after being used informally for many years. The species has also been adopted by others, including the New South Wales Waratahs rugby union team since the 1880s, and the former department store Grace Bros in a stylised form for their logo in the 1980s. Contemporary clothing designers Jenny Kee and Linda Jackson produced waratah-inspired fabric designs in the 1970s and 1980s during a resurgence of Australian motifs.

From 1956, the annual Waratah Festival was held in Sydney, run by the Sydney Committee. It took place from late October to early November, coinciding with the blooming of the waratahs. It was an important cultural event which included a parade, a popular art competition, beauty contests, exhibitions and performances. A highlight was the Lord Mayor's reception at the Sydney Town Hall for which the floral displays were made of hundreds of waratahs culled by Park Rangers from the national parks.

In 2009, the Premier of New South Wales, Nathan Rees, commissioned a state logo based on the floral emblem. The resultant logo design has been criticised as resembling a lotus rather than the New South Wales Waratah.

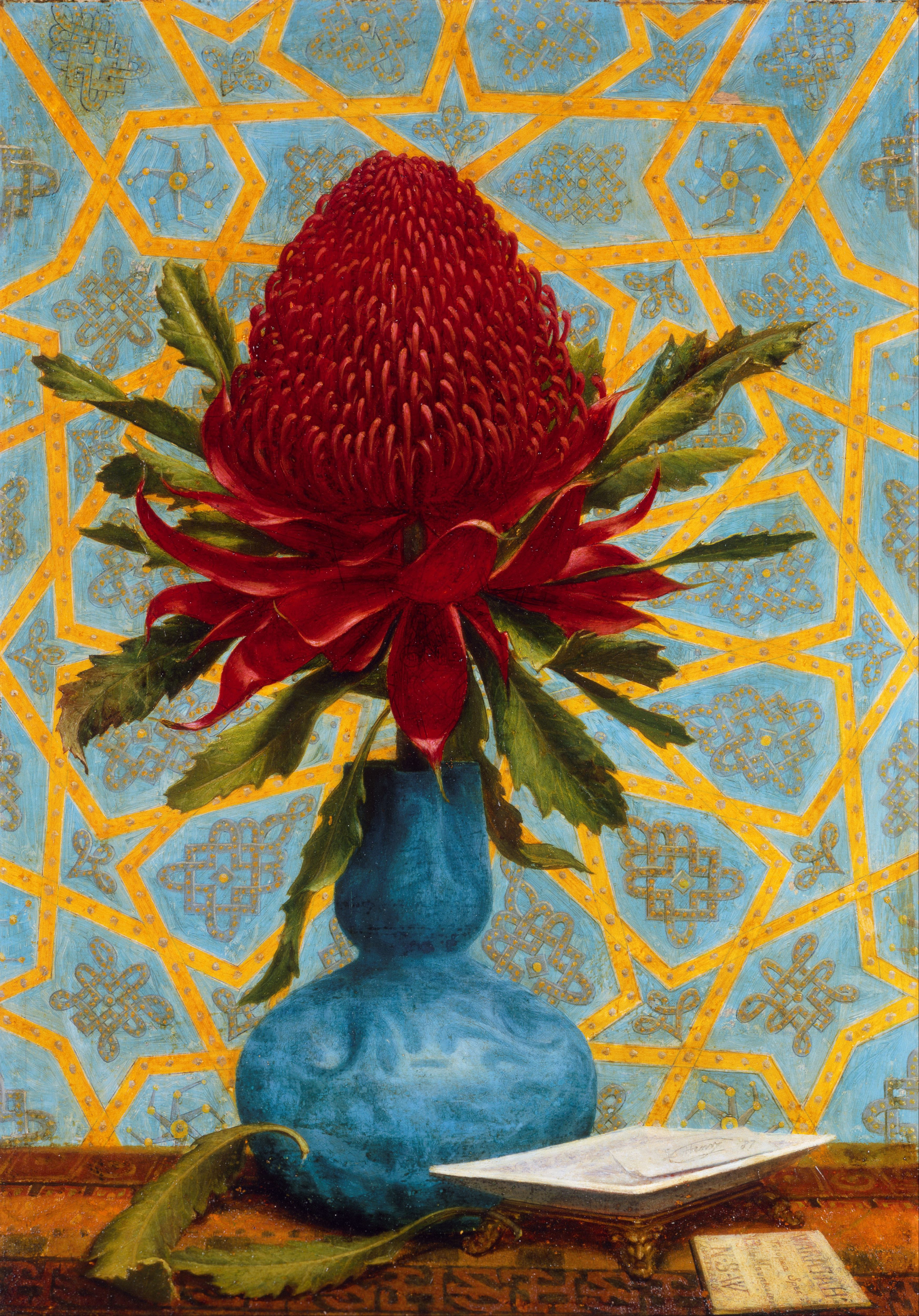
Waratah by Lucien Henry, 1887

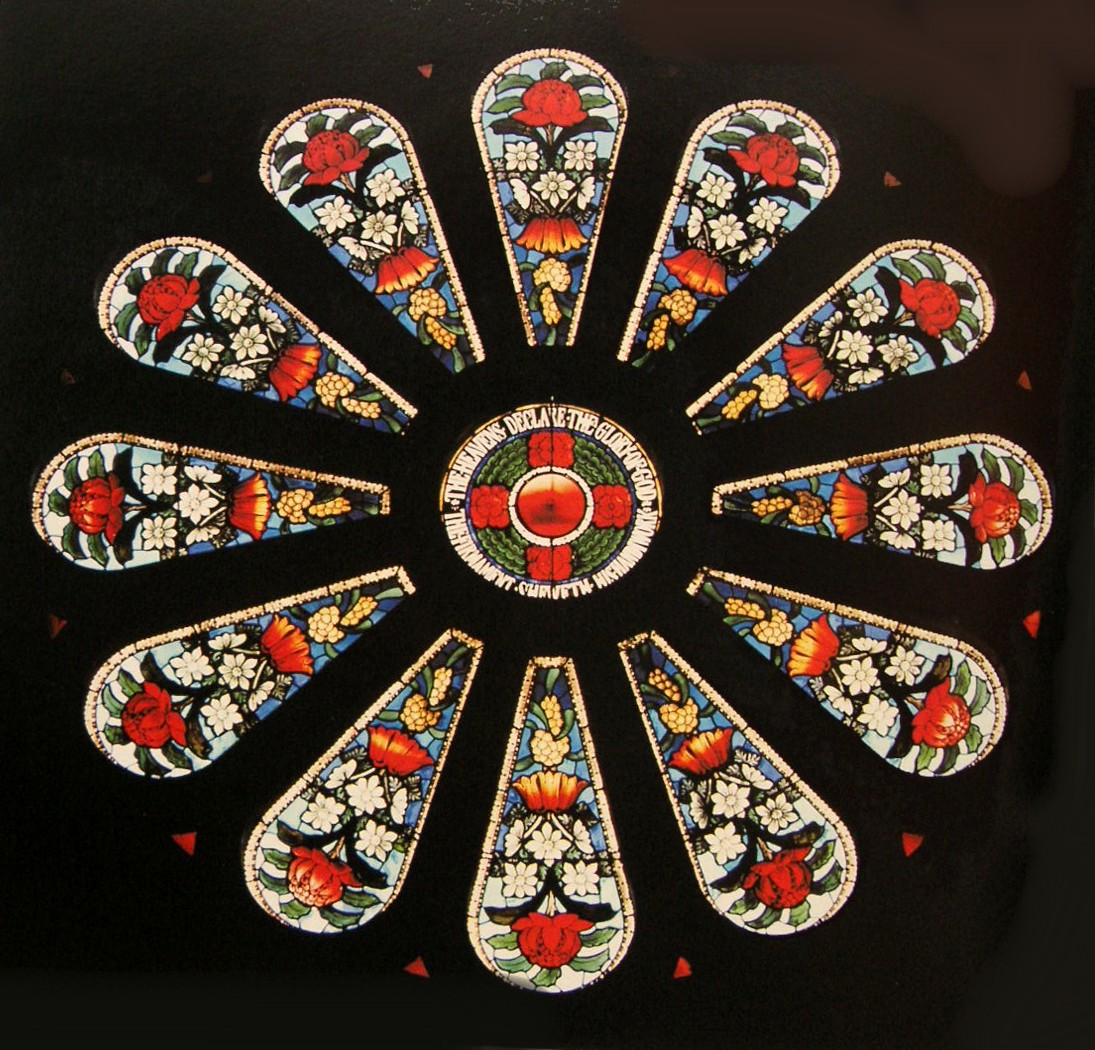
The Waratah window by Alfred Handel in St Bede's Church, Drummoyne. An early 20th century work, it depicts Australian native flowers, the red waratah, emblem of the state of New South Wales; flannel flowers, Christmas bells and wattle (Acacia). The inscription reads "The heavens declare the glory of God. The firmament showeth his handiwork"

== See also ==
- List of Australian floral emblems
