= Black foot disease of grapevine =

Plant disease

Black foot disease
- Causal agents: Cylindrocarpon fungi
- Hosts: Vitis vinifera
- EPPO Code: 1CYLCG
- Treatment: Pruning wound protection

The black foot disease is a grapevine trunk disease. It is caused by fungi in the genus Cylindrocarpon (C. fasciculare, C. pseudofasciculare, C. destructans, C. macrodidymum and C. obtusisporum).
