= Cylindrocarpon candidum =

Scientific classification
- Domain: Eukaryota
- Kingdom: Fungi
- Division: Ascomycota
- Class: Sordariomycetes
- Order: Hypocreales
- Family: Nectriaceae
- Genus: Cylindrocarpon
- Species: C. candidum

Binomial name
- Cylindrocarpon candidum (Link) Wollenw., (1926)

Synonyms
- Fusarium candidum (Link) Sacc. (1886); Fusidium candidum Link (1809)

Species of fungus

Cylindrocarpon candidum is a fungal plant pathogen that causes cankers on elm.
