= Cylindrocarpon musae =

Scientific classification
- Kingdom: Fungi
- Division: Ascomycota
- Class: Sordariomycetes
- Order: Hypocreales
- Family: Nectriaceae
- Genus: Cylindrocarpon
- Species: C. musae

Binomial name
- Cylindrocarpon musae C. Booth & R.H. Stover (1974)

Pathogenic fungus

Cylindrocarpon musae is a fungal plant pathogen that causes root rot in banana.

== Infection ==
Infection is aided by pre-existing infection: Secondary infection by C. musae is easier after primary infection by nematodes.
