= Lucien Henry =

French painter (1850–1896)

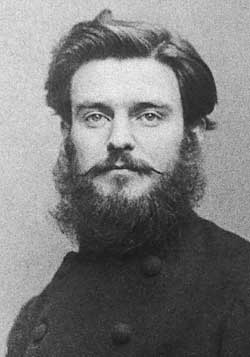
- Born: May 22, 1850; Sisteron
- Died: March 10, 1896 (aged 45); Saint-Léonard-de-Noblat

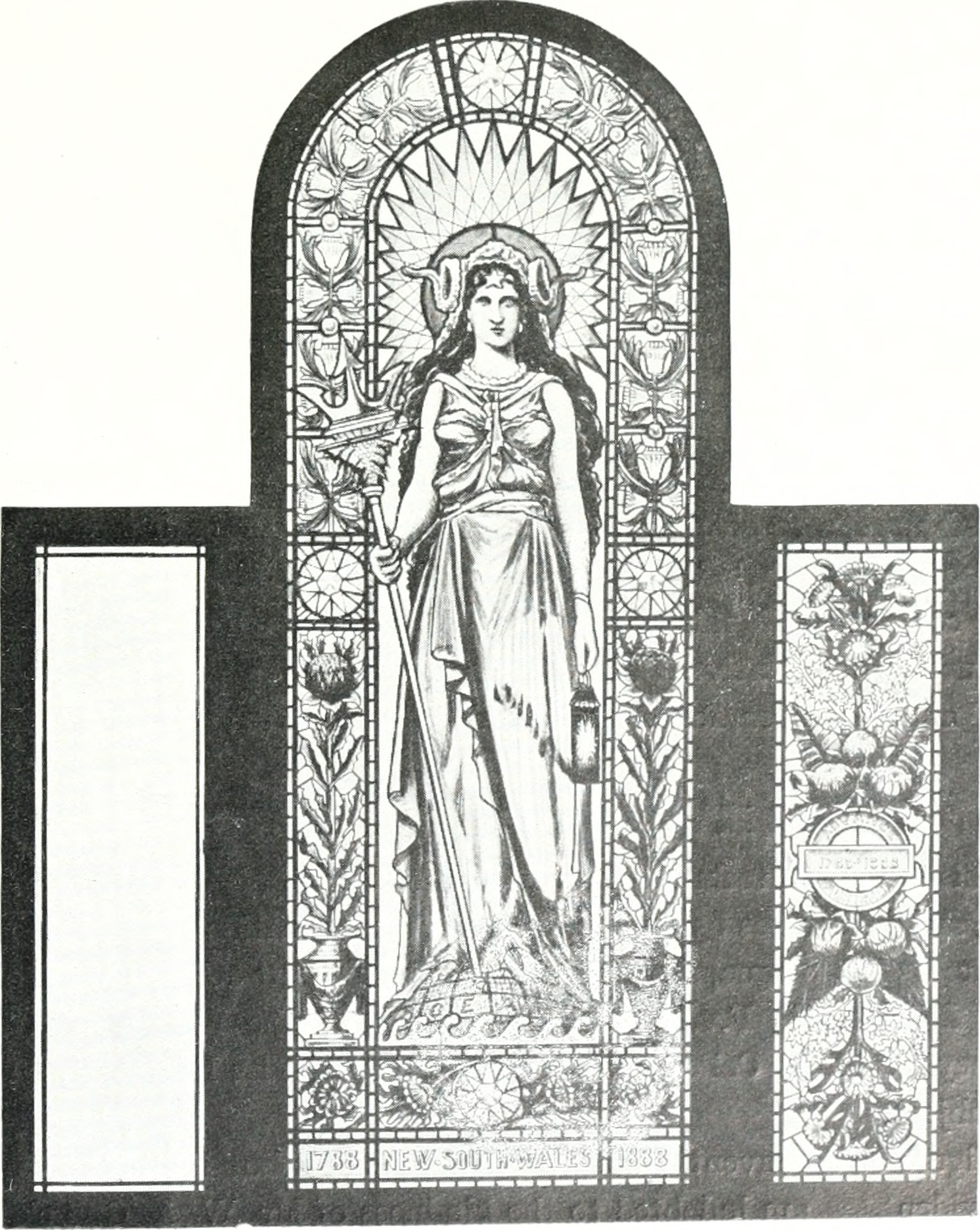
New South Wales (1888), stained glass window from the Sydney Town Hall

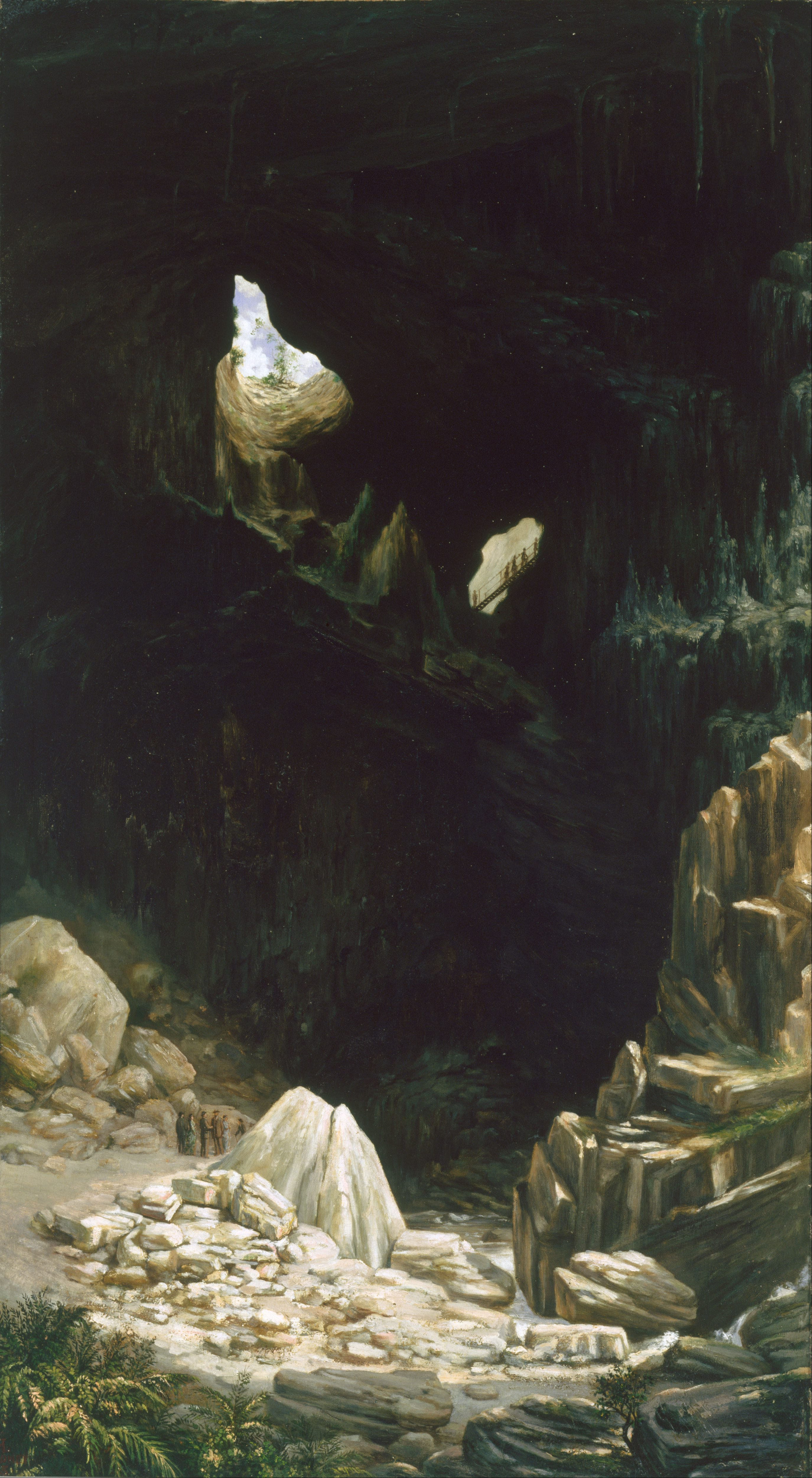
Devil's coach-house, Fish River Caves

Lucien Félix Henry (22 May 1850 - 10 March 1896), was a French painter, who was active in Sydney.

A socialist, he was part of the Paris Commune. He is often confused with Fortuné Henry, another Communard, in many historical works on the commune.

== Life ==
Lucien Henry arrived in Paris in 1867 to take courses in fine arts and studied under Viollet-le-Duc before studying with Jean-Léon Gérôme. A militant socialist and a member of the First International, he contributed to the newspaper La Resistance. During the Franco-Prussian war and the siege of Paris (1870-1871) he was a member of the National Guard. On March 11, 1871, he was elected leader of the legion of the 14th arrondissement and became “Colonel Henry”. On April 3, he took part in the exit from Châtillon (Battle of Meudon), where the communards were defeated by the forces of the Third Republic. During this unfortunate offensive he was arrested, and sentenced to death in 1872, but the sentence was commuted to deportation to New Caledonia.

Granted amnesty in 1878, he moved to Australia in June 1879, the year of Sydney International Exhibition. In 1880, he married another exile, Juliette Rastoul née Lopez. In Sydney, Henry became known as a painter and teacher. The stained glass windows in Sydney Town Hall were an important work. He became an art teacher at the Sydney Technical College, and took a uniquely Australian approach to the decorative arts, with the use of motifs inspired by local flora and fauna such as Telopea (waratah). Returning to France in 1891 in search of a publisher for a collection of his Australian watercolors, he died in 1896 in the hamlet of Le Pavé in Saint-Léonard-de-Noblat where he was buried.

== Work ==
Some of his work is held in the Art Gallery of New South Wales, and some 204 works are held at the Powerhouse Museum, including works with native flora motifs.
