= Cylindrocarpon ianthothele =

Scientific classification
- Domain: Eukaryota
- Kingdom: Fungi
- Division: Ascomycota
- Class: Sordariomycetes
- Order: Hypocreales
- Family: Nectriaceae
- Genus: Cylindrocarpon
- Species: C. ianthothele

Binomial name
- Cylindrocarpon ianthothele Wollenw. (1917)

Synonyms
- Cylindrocarpon ianthothele var. majus Wollenw. (1928); Cylindrocarpon ianthothele var. minus Reinking (1936); Cylindrocarpon ianthothele f. quercinum C.Moreau (1952); Cylindrocarpon ianthothele var. rugulosum C.Booth (1966)

Species of fungus

Cylindrocarpon ianthothele is a fungal plant pathogen in the family Nectriaceae. It was described as a new species in 1917 by the German mycologist Hans Wilhelm Wollenweber. The type specimen was collected from rotten bulbs of Cyclamen persicum and on stems of Rubus idaeus growing in Denmark and Switzerland. Although some varieties and a form of the fungus have been proposed, they are now not considered to have independent taxonomic significance and have been folded into synonymy with the nominate variety.
