= Campylocarpon pseudofasciculare =

Scientific classification
- Domain: Eukaryota
- Kingdom: Fungi
- Division: Ascomycota
- Class: Sordariomycetes
- Order: Hypocreales
- Family: Nectriaceae
- Genus: Campylocarpon
- Species: C. pseudofasciculare

Binomial name
- Campylocarpon pseudofasciculare Schroers, Halleen & Crous (2004)

Species of fungus

Campylocarpon pseudofasciculare is a species of parasitic fungus in the family Nectriaceae. Described as new to science in 2004, it is one of several pathogens associated with black foot disease in grape.
