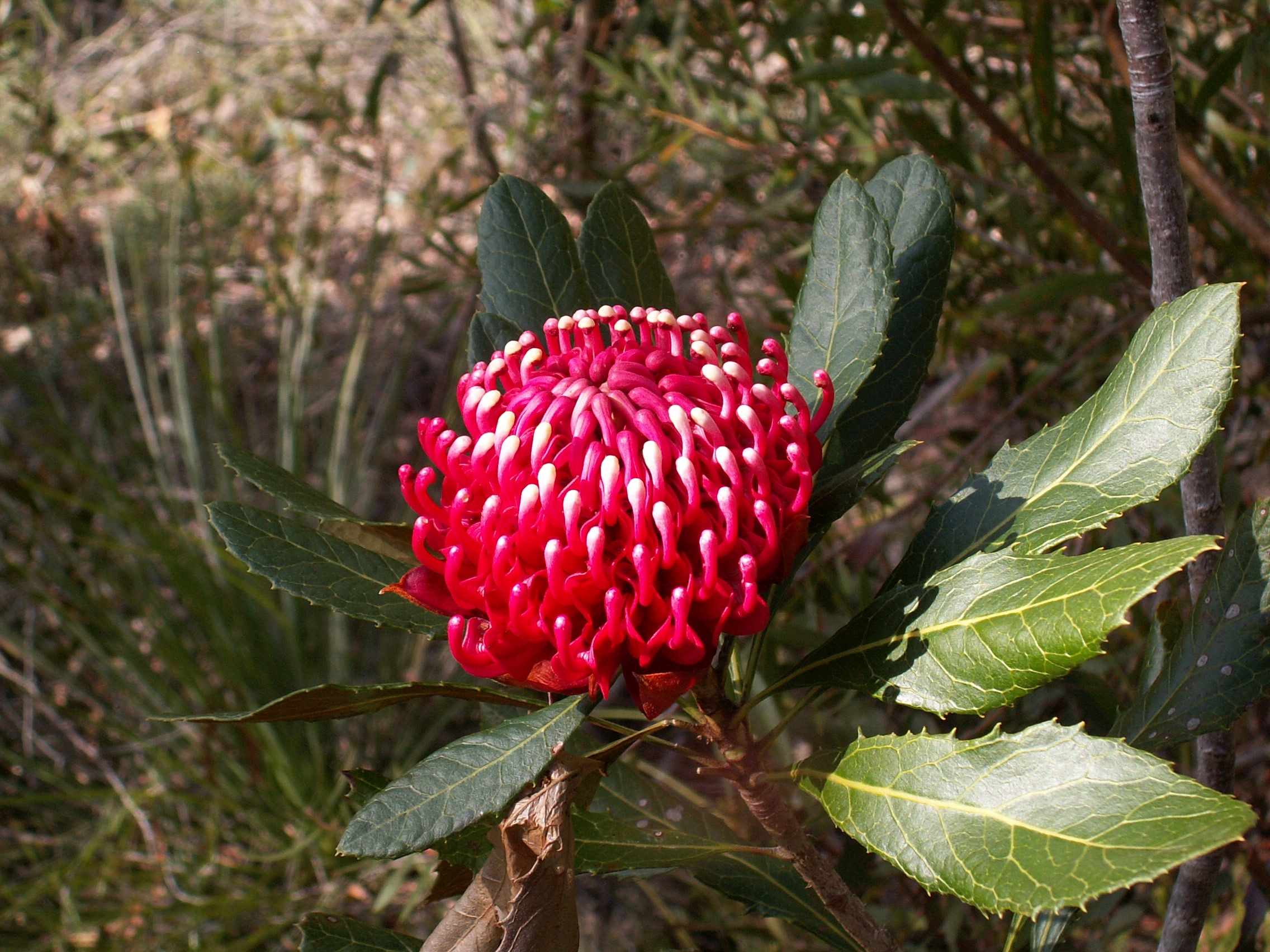
- Telopea aspera in the Gibraltar Range National Park.

Scientific classification
- Kingdom: Plantae
- Clade: Tracheophytes
- Clade: Angiosperms
- Clade: Eudicots
- Order: Proteales
- Family: Proteaceae
- Genus: Telopea
- Species: T. aspera

Binomial name
- Telopea aspera Crisp & P.H.Weston

= Telopea aspera =

Gibraltar Range waratah

Species of plant from New South Wales, Australia

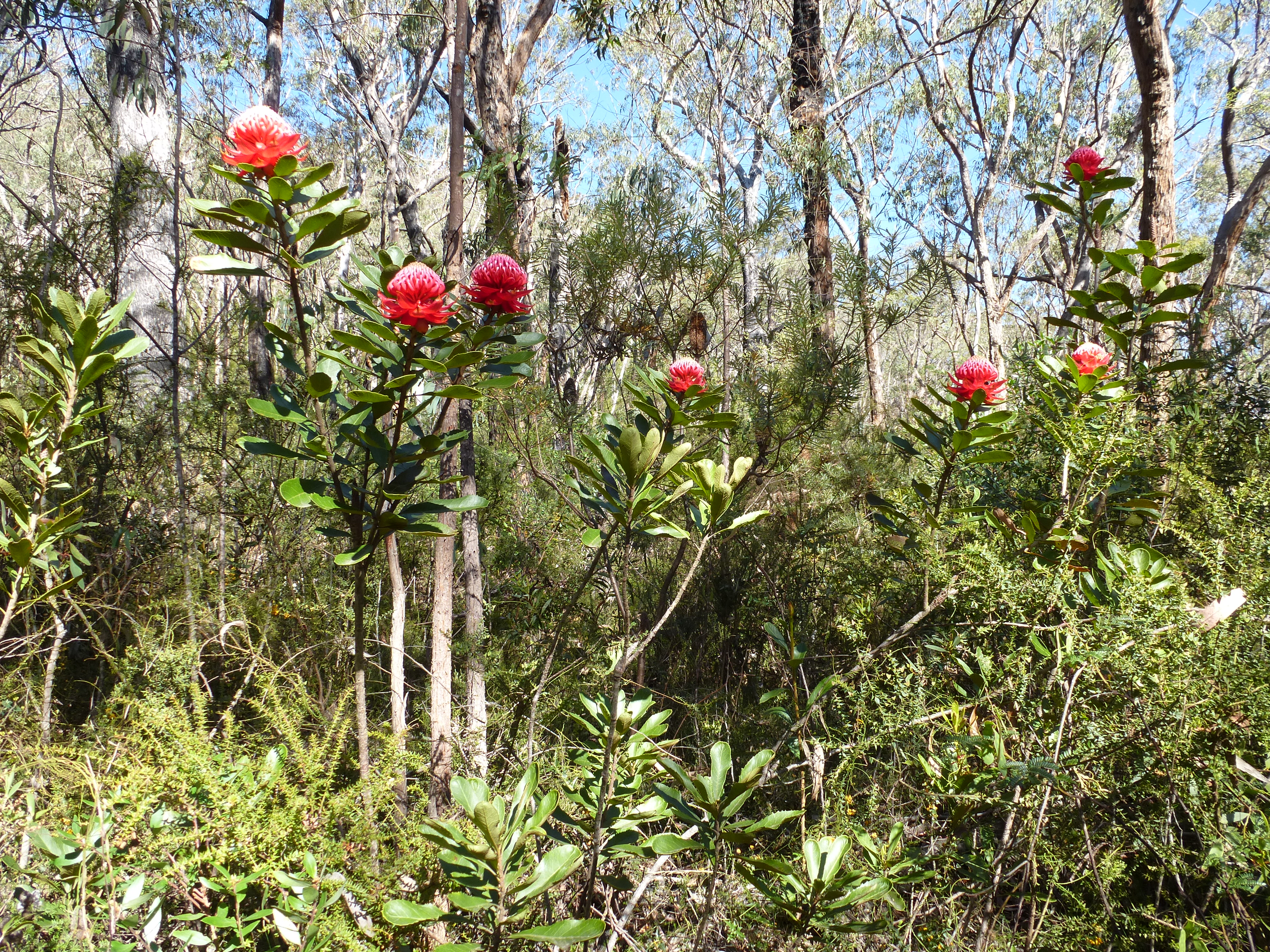
T. aspera (habit)

Telopea aspera, commonly known as Gibraltar Range waratah, is a plant in the family Proteaceae. It grows as a woody shrub to 3 metres (10 ft) high with leathery rough leaves and bright red flower heads known as inflorescences—each composed of hundreds of individual flowers. It is endemic to the New England region in New South Wales in Australia. It was formally described as a species by botanists Peter Weston and Mike Crisp in 1995, separated from its close relative Telopea speciosissima by its rough foliage and preference for drier habitat. Unlike its better known relative, Telopea aspera has rarely been cultivated.

== Description ==
Telopea aspera is a large erect shrub up to 3 metres (10 ft) tall with one or more stems. It has dull green leaves which are alternate, and are more coarsely-toothed than its southern relative, with 3 to 11 serrations on each leaf margin. Measuring 8–28 centimetres (3.1–11.0 in) long and 2–6.5 centimetres (0.8–2.6 in) wide, the leaves are tough and leathery with furry undersurfaces. There are prominent veins on both the upper and lower leaf surfaces. The inflorescences, which appear in spring, are large and crimson coloured. They consist of a large domed flowerhead ringed by bracts. There are anywhere from 90 to 250 individual flowers making up the flower head. These are followed by follicles 70–110 mm (2.8–4.3 in) long.

== Taxonomy ==
Telopea aspera is one of five species from south eastern Australia which make up the genus Telopea. Its closest relative is the very similar New South Wales waratah (T. speciosissima) from the Sydney region in central New South Wales, from which it was only recognised as a separate species in 1991, having previously been considered an unusual northern population. Initially provisionally called Telopea sp. A, it was formally described as Telopea aspera in 1995 by Michael Crisp and Peter Weston in the journal Telopea. The species name is derived from the Latin adjective asper "rough", and relates to the leaves.

The genus is classified in the subtribe Embothriinae of the Proteaceae, along with the tree waratahs (Alloxylon) from eastern Australia and New Caledonia, and Oreocallis and the Chilean firetree (Embothrium coccineum) from South America. Almost all these species have red terminal flowers, and hence the subtribe's origin and floral appearance must predate the splitting of Gondwana into Australia, Antarctica, and South America over 60 million years ago.

== Distribution and habitat ==
Gibraltar Range waratah is endemic to northern New South Wales, where it is restricted to the Gibraltar Range. Found in dry sclerophyll forest, it is a component of three plant communities within Gibraltar Range: the first is composed of Gibraltar ash (Eucalyptus olida), privet-leaved stringybark (Eucalyptus ligustrina) and diehard stringybark (Eucalyptus cameronii) and occurs on slopes and crests, while the second is composed of Gibraltar ash, large-fruited blackbutt (Eucalyptus pyrocarpa) and needlebark stringybark (Eucalyptus planchoniana) and occurs on ridges and north and west-facing slopes. Both are shrubby to open woodland communities found on skeletal to shallow soil on granite. The third community is a more sheltered one of New England blackbutt (Eucalyptus campanulata) and diehard stringybark found on lower slopes on sandy or loam soils.

== Ecology ==
The species was added to the Australian national list of threatened species on 4 September 2024.

This waratah resprouts from a woody lignotuber after bushfire. It stores energy and nutrients as a resource for rapid growth after a bushfire.

The prominent position and striking colour of most members of the subtribe Embothriinae both in Australia and South America strongly suggest they are adapted to pollination by birds, and have been for over 60 million years.

== Use in horticulture ==
Telopea aspera has been rarely cultivated, though it is possible that some garden specimens thought to be T. speciosissima may in fact have been this species. Plants have fared poorly at Australian Botanic Garden Mount Annan, perishing in summer, though the reason for this is not known. Cultivation of T. aspera at Mount Tomah Botanic Gardens has been more successful. The flowers and foliage are attractive horticultural features.
