= Campylocarpon fasciculare =

Scientific classification
- Domain: Eukaryota
- Kingdom: Fungi
- Division: Ascomycota
- Class: Sordariomycetes
- Order: Hypocreales
- Family: Nectriaceae
- Genus: Campylocarpon
- Species: C. fasciculare

Binomial name
- Campylocarpon fasciculare Schroers, Halleen & Crous (2004)

Species of fungus

Campylocarpon fasciculare is a species of parasitic fungus in the family Nectriaceae, and the type species of the genus Campylocarpon. Described as new to science in 2004, it is one of several pathogens associated with black foot disease in grape.
