= Pyrogenic flowering =

Fire-adapted trait in plants

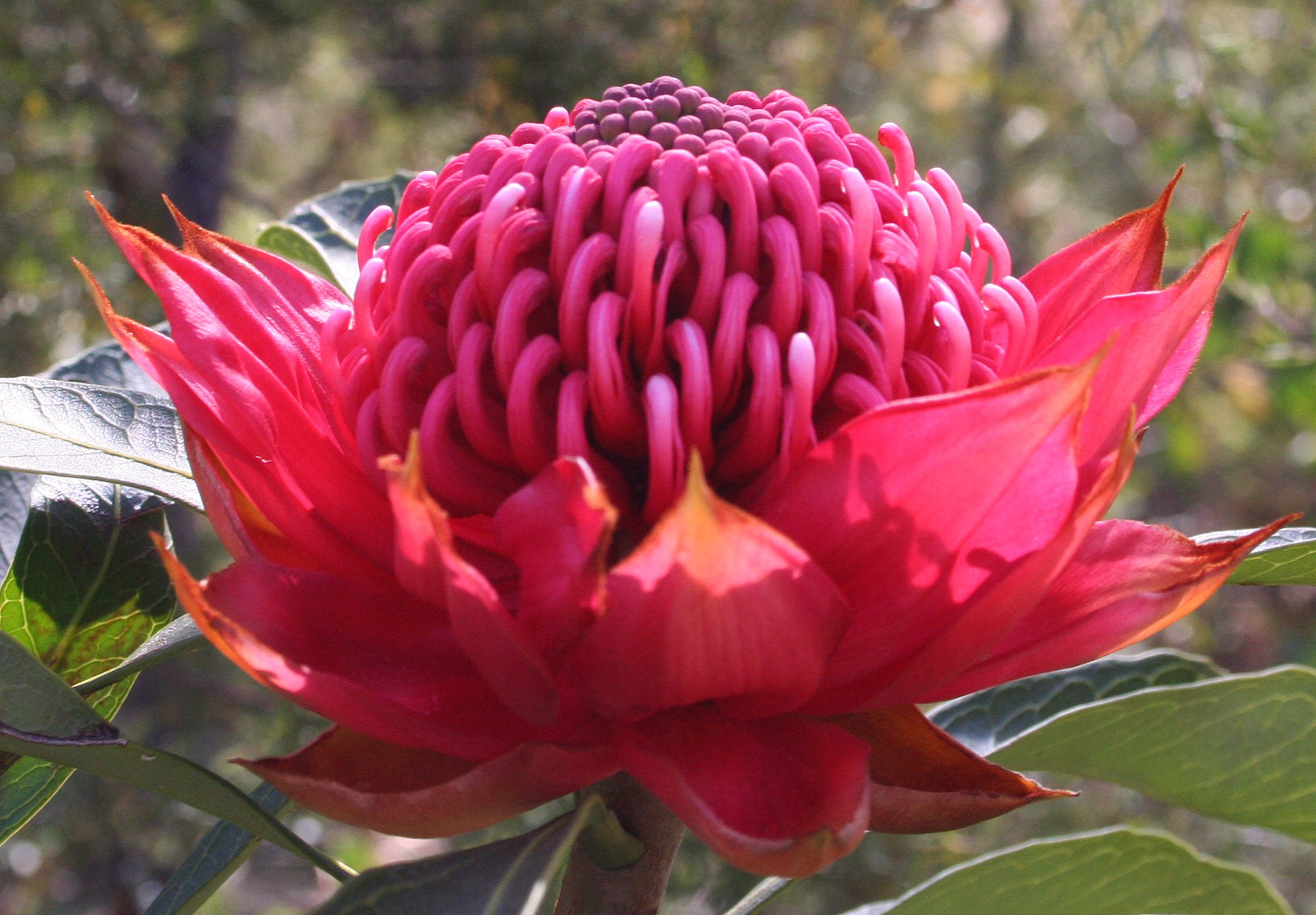
Telopea speciosissima - popular flower in New South Wales Australia that utilizes pyrogenic flowering.

Pyrogenic flowering is the fire-adapted trait in plants that is defined by an increase or a peak in flowering after a fire event. Pyrogenic flowering allows for plants to persist in fire-prone environments. Pyrogenic flowering can be facultative, meaning the rate of flowering temporarily increases following burning, or obligate, meaning flowering only occurs post-fire. There is high variation in the length of time between when a fire occurs and when pyrogenic flowering is triggered, and it is frequently species specific. Some pyrogenic flowering does not occur until up to a year post-fire whereas in extreme cases some flowers can emerge just hours after fire disturbance. Precise physiological triggers for pyrogenic flowering have not been heavily studied as is likely to vary between groups. Some suggested stimuli of pyrogenic flowering are the increase in light due to loss of canopy or competition, nutrient changes in the soil, or chemicals associated with fires acting as a trigger.

Pyrogenic flowering is likely to have first evolved in the Late Cretaceous period (146-66 million years ago) from a plant which already demonstrated post-fire re-sprouting ability, the trait evolved then more rapidly in the Cenozoic era. This flowering adaptation can be found in plants across the world in the Americas, Australia, Europe, and Africa in fire-prone environments such as heathland and savannas. Zirondi et al. found that nearly 66% of plants in the Cerrado tropical savanna of Brazil utilize some form of pyrogenic flowering as a reproductive strategy highlighting how widespread this strategy can be in fire-prone environments.

The most well known species of plant that utilizes pyrogenic flowering strategies is Telopea speciosissima, commonly known as Waratah. It is the floral emblem of New South Wales in Australia, and is frequently used as a motif on insignia and official emblems. Waratah has been successfully cultivated in many areas of the world, and hybridization of different plants have resulted in many different color varieties.

== Benefits ==
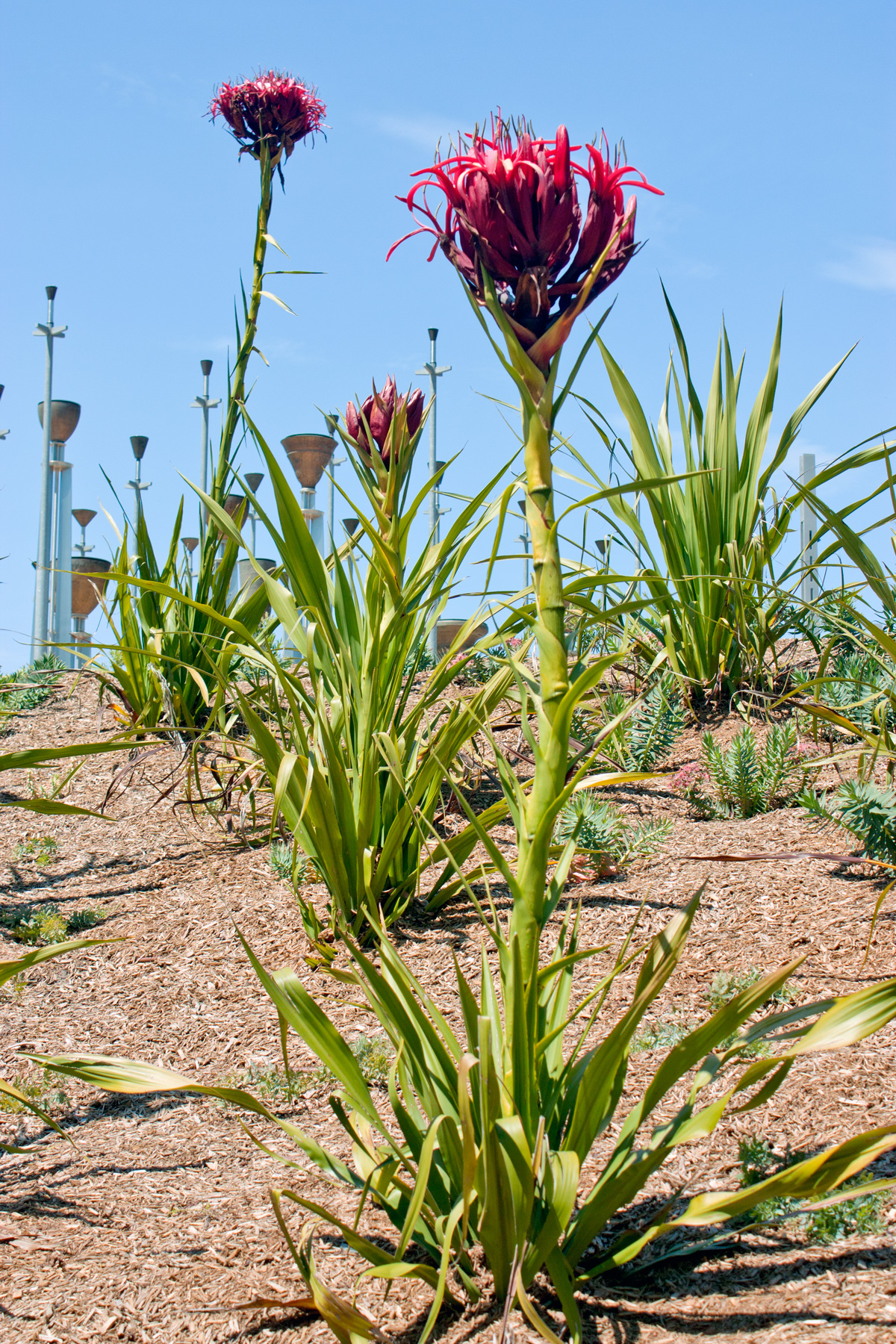
Doryanthes excelsa - facultative flowering plant native to Australia. Utilized in landscaping.

Pyrogenic flowering confers many fitness benefits to plants in fire-prone habitats. Plants with pyrogenic flowering will flower at the same time after a fire, potentially increasing the rate of pollination and creating a seed-boom which satiates seed predators, positively affecting the overall germination rate. The delayed recruitment of seeds seen in pyrogenic flowering may also allow the plants to avoid periods of high seed predation post-fire. Flowering post fire may also be advantageous in allowing the plants to take advantage of new and plentiful resources post-fire, avoiding competition during non-fire periods.

== Ecology ==
Fire exclusion has resulted in a declining reproductive output, and thus population size, of some species of pyrogenic plants. Additionally, evidence suggests that fires that occur outside of normal seasonal burn times (typically summer months) can have negative repercussions on pyrogenic flowering plants, including lower flowering and seed production when compared to fire-exposed plants during normal burn times. Competition between pyrogenic flowering plants may also be impacted by the anthropogenic control of fire, as alteration of fire seasons or fire intensity may favour one species over another.

== Pyrogenic flowering plants ==
- Aldama grandiflora
- Anemopaegma arvense
- Blandfordia nobilis
- Bulbostylis paradoxa
- Calliandra dysantha
- Dalechampia linearis
- Doryanthes excelsa
- Lippia horridula
- Mesosetum ferrugineum
- Piriqueta breviseminata
- Polygala coriacea
- Telopea speciosissima
- Turnera emendata
- Xanthorrhoea australis
- Xanthorrhoea fulva
