= Campylocarpon =

Scientific classification
- Domain: Eukaryota
- Kingdom: Fungi
- Division: Ascomycota
- Class: Sordariomycetes
- Order: Hypocreales
- Family: Nectriaceae
- Genus: Campylocarpon; Halleen, Schroers & Crous (2004)

Type species
- Campylocarpon fasciculare Schroers, Halleen & Crous (2004)

Species
- C. fasciculare C. pseudofasciculare

Genus of fungi

Campylocarpon is a genus of ascomycete fungi in the family Nectriaceae. The genus was described in 2004. The two species in the genus, C. fasciculare and C. pseudofasciculare, are associated with black foot disease of grapevines, in which the roots develop black, sunken, necrotic lesions.
