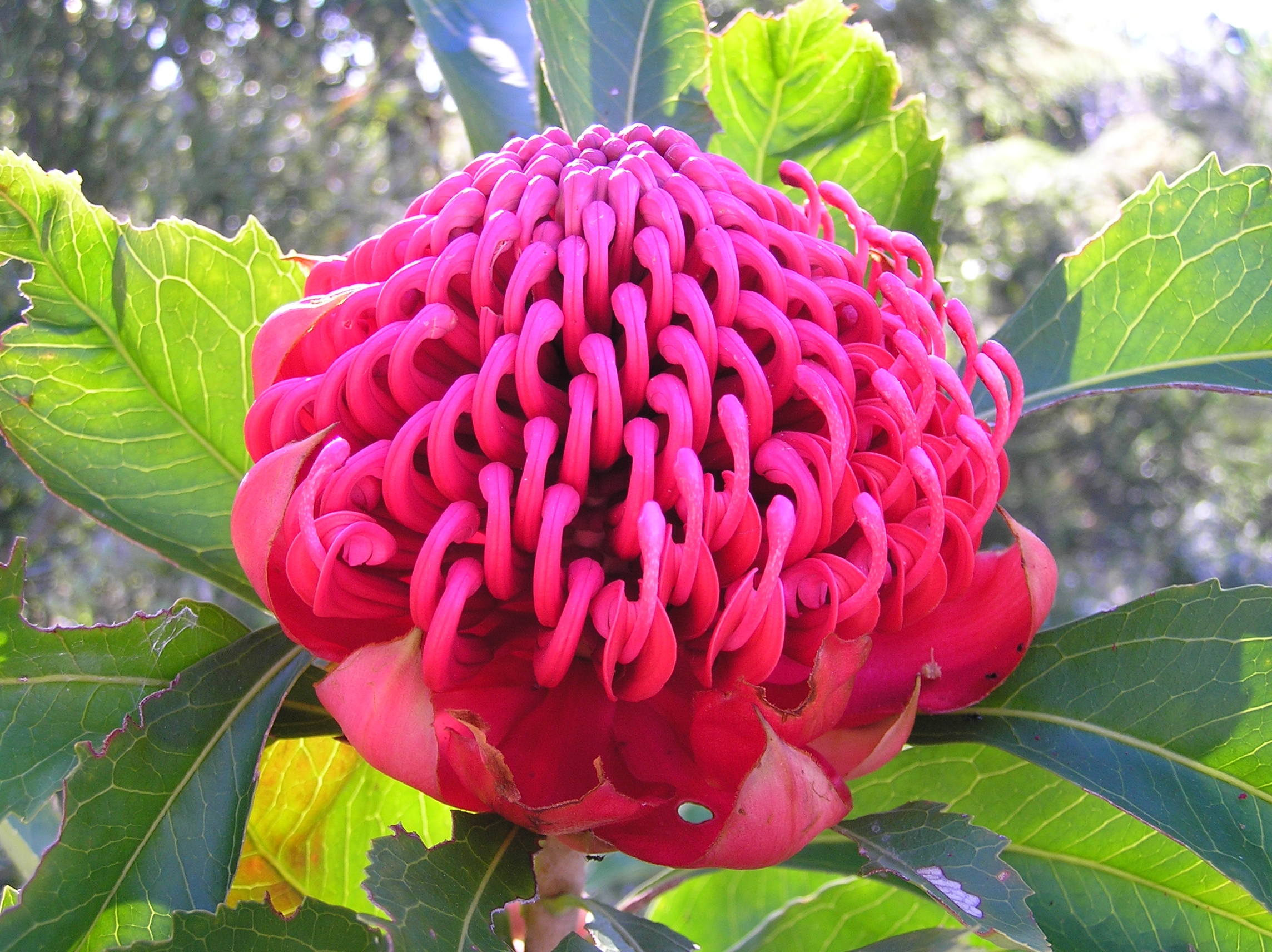
- Telopea speciosissima

Scientific classification
- Kingdom: Plantae
- Clade: Tracheophytes
- Clade: Angiosperms
- Clade: Eudicots
- Order: Proteales
- Family: Proteaceae
- Subfamily: Grevilleoideae
- Tribe: Embothrieae
- Subtribe: Embothriinae
- Genus: Telopea (Sm.) R.Br.

Synonyms
- Hylogyne Salisb.

= Waratah =

Genus of plants from southeastern Australia

The waratah (genus Telopea) is an Australian-endemic genus of five species of large shrubs to small trees, native to the southeastern parts of Australia (New South Wales, Victoria, and Tasmania). The best-known species in this genus is Telopea speciosissima, which has bright red flowers and is the New South Wales (NSW) state emblem. The waratah is a member of the family Proteaceae, flowering plants (Angiosperms) distributed in the Southern Hemisphere. The key diagnostic feature of Proteaceae is the inflorescence, which is often very large, brightly coloured and showy, consisting of many small flowers densely packed into a compact head or spike. Species of waratah boast such inflorescences ranging from 6–15 cm in diameter with a basal ring of coloured bracts. The leaves are spirally arranged, 10–20 cm long and 2–3 cm broad with entire or serrated margins. The name waratah comes from the Eora Aboriginal people, the traditional owners of the Sydney region.

== Taxonomy ==
The genus Telopea belongs to the plant family Proteaceae. Within the Proteaceae, their closest relatives appear to be the genera Alloxylon (tree waratahs), Oreocallis and Embothrium, a group with generally terminal red flowers that skirt the southern edges of the Pacific Rim. Together they make up the subtribe Embothriinae. The genus was first described by Robert Brown in 1810 from the type species Telopea speciosissima. There are five species of plant within the genus, all of which readily hybridize in cultivation. There are two main branches, with one being the species pair of T. speciosissima and T. aspera, with the other lineage (clade) giving rise to T. truncata first, then T. oreades and T. mongaensis. Two synapomorphies—distinguishing common characteristics presumed not present in ancestors—have been identified in the speciosissima-aspera lineage, leaves with toothed margins, and large red involucral bracts. The truncata-oreades-mongaensis lineage has flowers that open from the centre to the edge of the inflorescence (basitonic) rather than the reverse (acrotonic), which is a feature of the speciosissima-aspera clade and more distant relatives.

== Species ==
The genus Telopea contains five species:

Species of Waratah
Common and binomial names	Authority	Image	Description	Range
Gibraltar Range waratah or New England waratah (Telopea aspera)	Crisp & P.H. Weston		It was split off as a separate species from the NSW waratah by Crisp and Weston in 1987 and in overall appearance is very similar to T. speciosissima.	Northeast New South Wales
Braidwood Waratah or Monga waratah (Telopea mongaensis)	Cheel		Lignotuberous shrub with red flowerheads. Closely related to (and closely resembles) T, oreades.	Southeastern New South Wales
Gippsland waratah or Victorian waratah (Telopea oreades)	F.Muell.		Generally a tall shrub to small tree, with red flowerheads. Closely related to (and closely resembles) T, mongaensis.	East Gippsland in Victoria and into far southern New South Wales
New South Wales waratah (Telopea speciosissima)	(Sm.) R.Br.		It is the best-known waratah with its large, bright red inflorescences.	East New South Wales
Tasmanian waratah (Telopea truncata)	(Labill.) R.Br.		Generally a shrub with red flowerheads.	Throughout Tasmania between 600-1200m elevation, and has been brought into cultivation in Tasmania.

== Habitat ==
Species grow as either large shrubs or small trees with spirally arranged leaves with either entire or serrated margins. They prefer sandy loam soils and are a pyrogenic flowering species, meaning that they rely on post-fire flowering followed by production and dispersal of non-dormant seeds to take advantage of favourable growing conditions in the altered environment following a fire.

=== Distribution ===
The natural distributions of the five species of Telopea are all confined to east coast regions from northern New South Wales to Tasmania. Each of the species has its own distinctive natural distribution with minimal or no overlap. Climatic changes may have restricted the expansion of species distribution or led to its isolation in a particular region. However, waratahs can also grow outside of these natural distribution areas. Cultivation mostly occurs north of Sydney and in the Dandenong Ranges, Victoria. T. speciosissima has also been grown successfully in areas not on the map. In Australia these areas include south-west Western Australia, the Queensland coast and also Toowoomba. Overseas, New Zealand, the USA, South Africa, and Israel are all also able to grow waratah with varying degrees of success. It was introduced to England in 1789 but cannot survive English winters out of doors except in the south-west coastal regions, and it rarely flowers in glasshouses.

== Cultivation ==
For some time the waratah has had a reputation as a difficult plant. It has a complex culture and for many years there have been cases of people trying to establish the plant only to have the attempt fail. This can be the effect of unsuitable soil conditions, aspect or climate. The waratah is also a slow plant to mature with a flowering period that is short, unpredictable and unreliable. Early issues with cultivation meant that approximately 90% of all waratahs sold at Sydney’s Flemington markets in the early 90s were bush picked. Some progress has been made in the 20 years since then with several cultivars being commercially grown mostly in areas to the North and South of Sydney and in the Dandenong Ranges in Victoria. Issues with cultivation are still present however.

=== Propagation ===
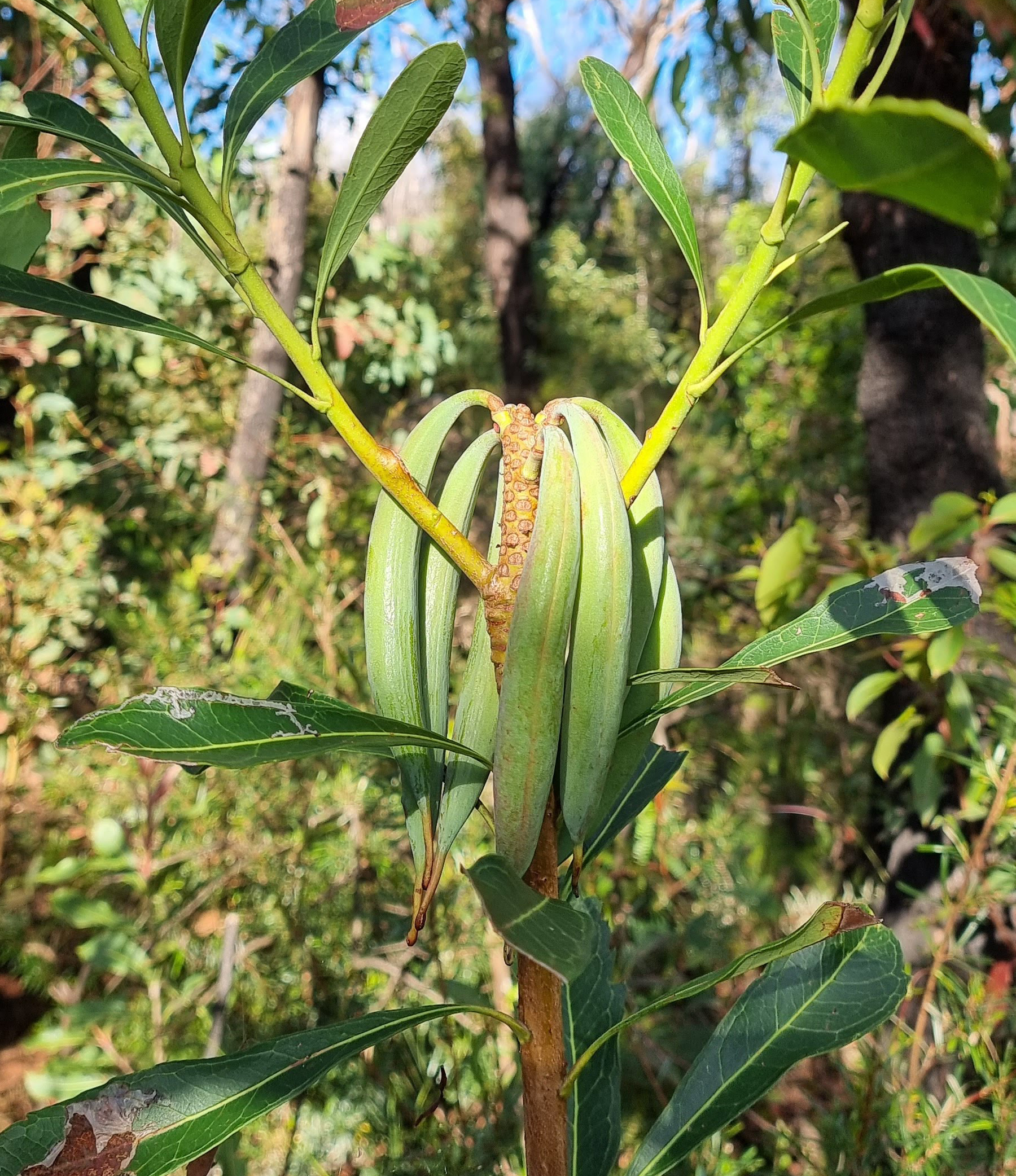
Waratah seed pods, Blue Mountains, Sydney, 2022

The propagation of waratah for commercial production is relatively easy in comparison to other stages of the growth cycle. Plants are usually propagated from cuttings, fresh seed or stored seed. Fresh seed has a good germination rate but deteriorates fairly rapidly unless stored at low temperature and low humidity. Dry seed will last a few years in refrigerated storage but should be treated with a general purpose fungicide prior to storage and at propagation to ensure good germination rates and healthy seedlings. The best time to take cuttings is when the plant is experiencing a flush of growth. The cuttings are taken from firm wood from the last twelve months growth. If plant material is scarce, single nodes can be used for cutting propagation.

Other methods of propagation that are successful but not widely used for commercial production include grafting and tissue culture. Stock for grafting is vigorous and as such is labour-intensive in constant control of stock regrowth from the lignotuber. As such, it is not a recommended method but is useful for the fast growth of limited material. Rootstock and scion combinations are used for many woody perennials to provide the necessary mix of floral or fruit characteristics and cultural requirements.

Tissue culture is very labour-intensive and would likely only be used in the case of rapidly increasing the number of plants from limited or valuable material. The process is complex though as different clones require different optimal culture conditions requiring different developmental work for each clone. There also exists problems with hardening off, with roots and leaves produced in vivo dying off on planting out.

For Telopea plants propagated from seed, the transition from seedling to flower takes about 5 years. Cuttings may take only 2 years. The most common form of propagation is from seed, however, certain varieties and cultivars must be propagated from cuttings if the grower wishes the plants to remain true to form. Fresh seed has a higher viability than cuttings and will germinate 2–3 weeks after sewing.

=== Commercial cultivation ===
The overall cultivation of the waratah as a single process is a tricky one as flowering time, number and quality are easily affected by changes in the plant environment. These factors must be considered as early as prior to buying land for production. North facing aspect ensures a maximum of sun exposure. A combination of northerly, easterly and westerly aspects will spread the flowering time with the western slope flowering slightly later on. As the location approaches the equator, flowering time will be earlier. Elevation also has to be considered as it will affect temperature, a major influence on flowering time. More flowers will be produced in full sunlight although better quality flowers are found in the shade. Paul Nixon (1997) in his book ‘The Waratah’ claims that ‘the ideal situation is to have rich, well drained, deep soil with a north-easterly aspect giving the plants full sun until the flowers buds have initiated and then put shade cloth over the bushes until they have flowered’.

A primary consideration for cultivation is water drainage. The waratah naturally grows in poor, sandy soils where it thrives due to the soils excellent water draining properties. Drainage properties can be linked to aspect and as a result plants grown on a north easterly aspect will generally flower 1–2 weeks earlier than a westerly aspect at the same location. Watering systems must also be carefully considered to coincide with correct drainage. As an Australian native the waratah is a sturdy plant well adapted to coping with harsh environments and low rainfall. Watering systems are still necessary for cultivation in order to produce a reliable crop and a quality bloom.

In the wild the waratah has become adapted to growing in nutrient-poor soils leading many people to believe that this is what is necessary for the development of the plant. Fertilisers are not necessary for the development of the plant but the waratah has been shown to be receptive to some treatments. Many native plants have been known to have poor establishment in soils with high levels of nitrogen and phosphorus. This coincides with the observation that fertiliser application immediately after transplant of waratahs in the field often leads to high mortalities. Other studies have reported a strong growth response to high nutrient levels, particularly phosphorus. As yet, the details of this response are not yet clear and suggest a complex nitrogen-phosphorus relationship. Earlier work (1963) on related species, had indicated that fertiliser application may hasten maturation and give early flowering. If fertiliser is applied, drainage properties of the soil mean that nutrients are quickly leached and so the best application method is multiple applications at critical stages in development such as flush periods.

Pruning can be used in the commercial growth of waratahs in the effort to design a shape for the plant that will encourage the maximum production of saleable blooms. The aim is to get as many growing tips as possible as it is on these that the flowers will develop.

With the correct mix of factors for cultivation it is possible to produce up to sixty blooms per plant per year. This could translate to up to 20,000 to 50,000 blooms per ha. Waratah inflorescences are harvested when 0–50% of flowers are open, although inflorescences with 0–5% of flower open have the longest vase life and least opportunity for bract damage in the field.

=== Cultivars ===
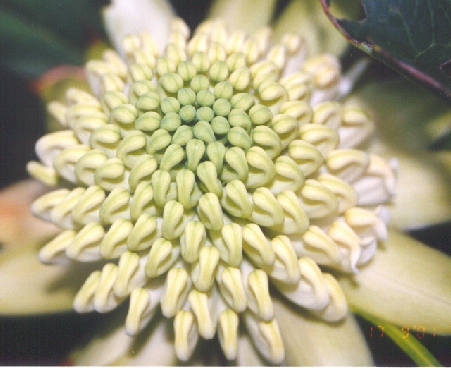
Cultivar 'Wirrimbirra White'

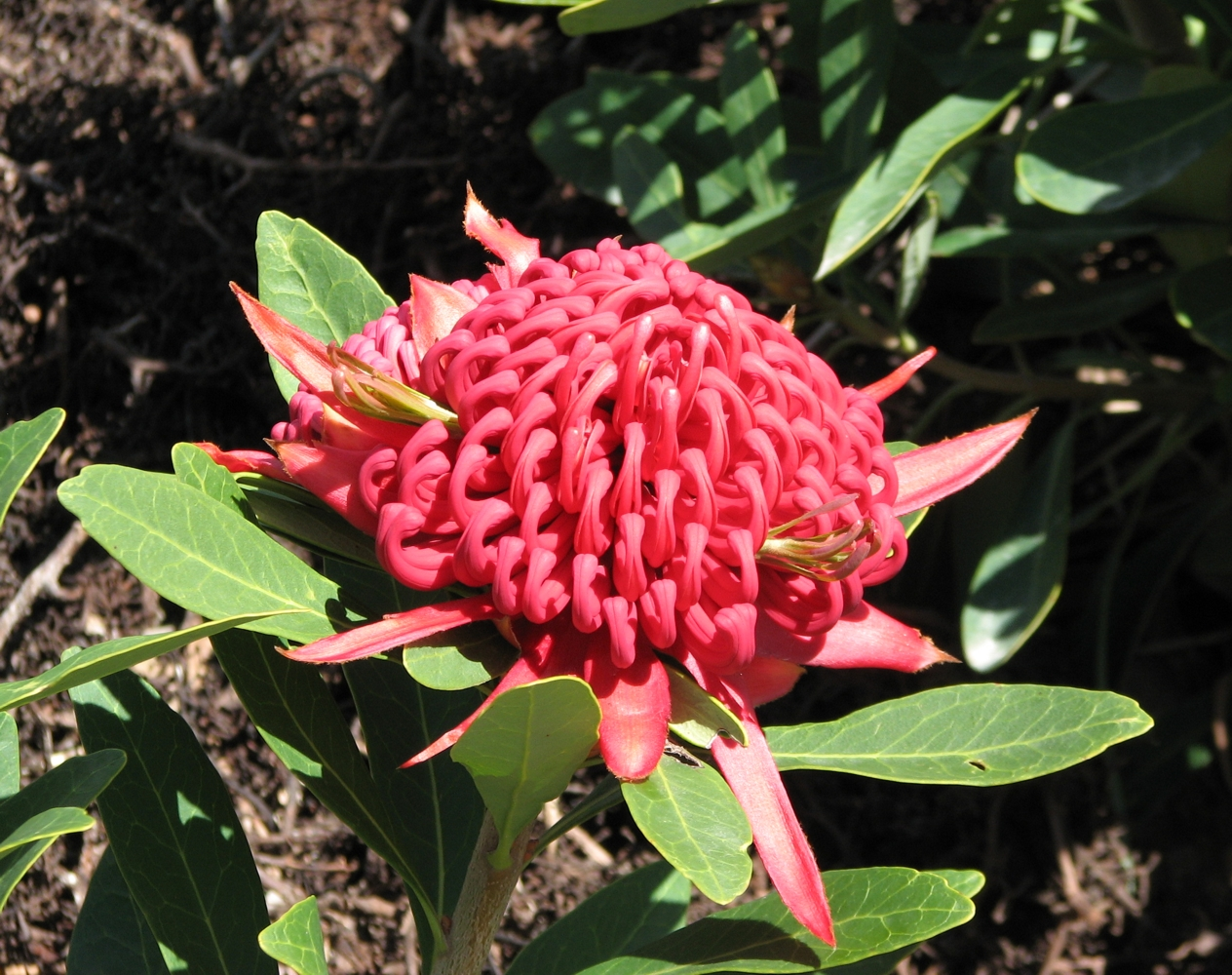
Cultivar 'Braidwood Brilliant'

A number of selected forms of T. speciosissima and hybrids with other Telopea species are being brought into cultivation. These exhibit variations in the colour of the flowers and/or the bracts. Some examples include:

- 'Fire 'n' Ice' – red with white tips
- 'Songlines' – pink in bud, opening flame red
- 'Dreaming' – styles open white and mature to pink
- 'Shade of Pale' – cream tinged with pink
- 'Brimstone Blush' – red with a pink blush
- 'Braidwood Brilliant' – red (T. speciosissima x T. mongaensis)
- 'Wirrimbirra White' – almost pure white
- 'Shady Lady' – blood red (T. speciosissima x T. oreades)

=== Issues of cultivation ===
Issues with cultivation occur throughout the growth cycle of Telopea spp. with the first issues being encountered at the seedling stage. Waratah seedlings are often associated with a common plant condition known as damping off. Damping off is a condition that causes the death of seeds or seedlings facilitated by a number of different fungal pathogens. A given seed can become infected with a fungus, often causing it to darken and soften, killing the seedling before it emerges or causing it to emerge in a pre-weakened state. Seedlings can also be infected after emergence resulting in the stem thinning until it eventually rots and the seedling topples over. The problem is often associated with and encouraged by excessively wet conditions.

Another major issue for production is bract browning – a discolouration of the showy floral bracts of the floral head occurring prior to harvest. Bract browning has been a major restraint to financial returns due to reduced cut flower quality. Browning is usually a result of sun damage but can also be associated with wind burn. The addition of shade cloths to crop management strategies has been shown to reduce levels of excessive light and has significantly minimised financial losses due to the reduction of occurrence of bract browning.

In the natural state, the waratah does not compete very well with surrounding shrubs and is at its best after fire when competition is removed. This means that weed presence during cultivation has a profound effect on growth, particularly when the waratahs are small. Weeds should be seriously tended to in the early stages of growth. Once plants have reached waist height cases should be analysed individually to determine the best method of weed control.

In New South Wales the most destructive pest to waratah crops is the macadamia twig girdler (Neodrepta luteotactella). The damage is caused by the larvae and damage generally first shows at a branch fork or leaf. The condition is generally confined to young shrubs or trees. The leaves are skeletonised and the larvae web them together into a shelter that incorporates larval faeces. Larvae can also burrow into the developing flower head, obliterating a crop entirely if left uncontrolled. Biological control methods include encouragement of bird species. The borer is present throughout the year and so pesticide treatments with a strong persistent spray should be carried out monthly. What is used for the borer should also control lesser pests such as white scale, which is common in the natural state, and Macadamia leafminer (Acocercops chionosema). Leafminer poses no threat to the life of the plant but it is preferred that stems for the market still have leaves attached. Thus damaged leaves lower the value of the crop. Chemicals with zylene or toluene should not be used as the will not be tolerated by the plant.

There are also issues of fungal infection. Oomycete and fungal species cause stem rot (Phytophthora spp.) and root rot (Rhizoctonia spp.) that can ultimately cause plant death but can usually be controlled by adequate drainage.

A problem for production that emanates from within the plant is the high amount of genetic and therefore morphological variability present in the flowers produced. The need to lift the quality and consistency of cut flower product has been repeatedly highlighted by industry reviews. Inconsistency of product is a key impediment to further industry growth.

== Floral morphology ==
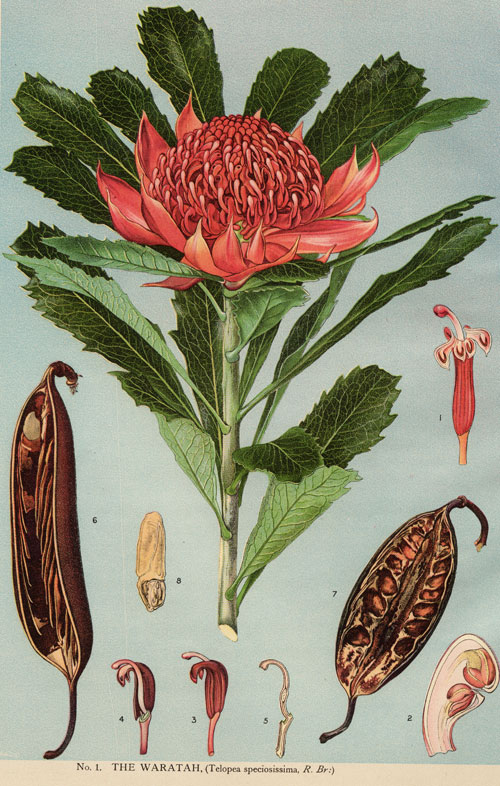
Telopea speciosissima floral morphology

In many genera of Proteaceae the inflorescence is very large and showy, often in bright colours, consisting of many small flowers densely packed into a compact head or spike. The individual flowers within the inflorescence also give Proteaceae species a unique look. Telopea species are long-lived, perennial plants that re-sprout from lignotubers after fire. After a few years of fire, re-sprouting stems produce the terminal flowers which continue the flowering cycle annually. The Telopea 'flower' is in fact an inflorescence that comprises from as few as 10 to as many as 240 individual flowers, depending upon the species concerned. The style is thickened at the distal end to form a 'pollen-presenter'. Pollen presenters have an area on the style end that presents the pollen to the pollinator. The stigma is initially trapped within the perianth and as the style grows it becomes bent until it splits the perianth and the pistil is released to spring upright. An open inflorescence usually contains functionally male and female flowers at any one time. Inflorescences range from 6–15 cm in diameter with a basal ring of coloured bracts.

=== Flowering processes ===
Before a flower can be produced the plant must undergo floral induction and initiation. Floral induction involves physiological processes in the plant that result in the shoot apical meristem becoming competent to develop flowers. It involves biochemical changes at the apex, particularly those caused by cytokinins and the processes can be reversed. Floral initiation is the morphological transformation of an induced growing point from a vegetative to a floral primordium and involves the plant hormone florigen. Florigen is produced in the leaves in reproductively favourable conditions and acts in buds and growing tips to induce a number of different physiological and morphological changes. Once this process begins, in most plants, it cannot be reversed and the stems develop flowers, even if the initial start of the flower formation event was dependent of some environmental cue. Once the process begins, even if that cue is removed the stem will continue to develop a flower. Flower induction and initiation can simply occur when a plant has reached a mature enough age. However, in many plant species floral process occur in response to a number of environmental signals, or alternatively, are repressed by environmental signals.

Floral initiation in T. speciosissima has been observed from mid-December, with floral buds developing more rapidly on older shoots and floral primordia emerging from mid-January to February. The floral primordia initiate over a 6–8 week period after primary flush growth from November to January. After the primordia initiation there may be another vegetative flush of growth on the plants. The flower develops in bud form for seven to eight months. The date of flowering is highly variable as waratah flowering is sensitive to its environment.

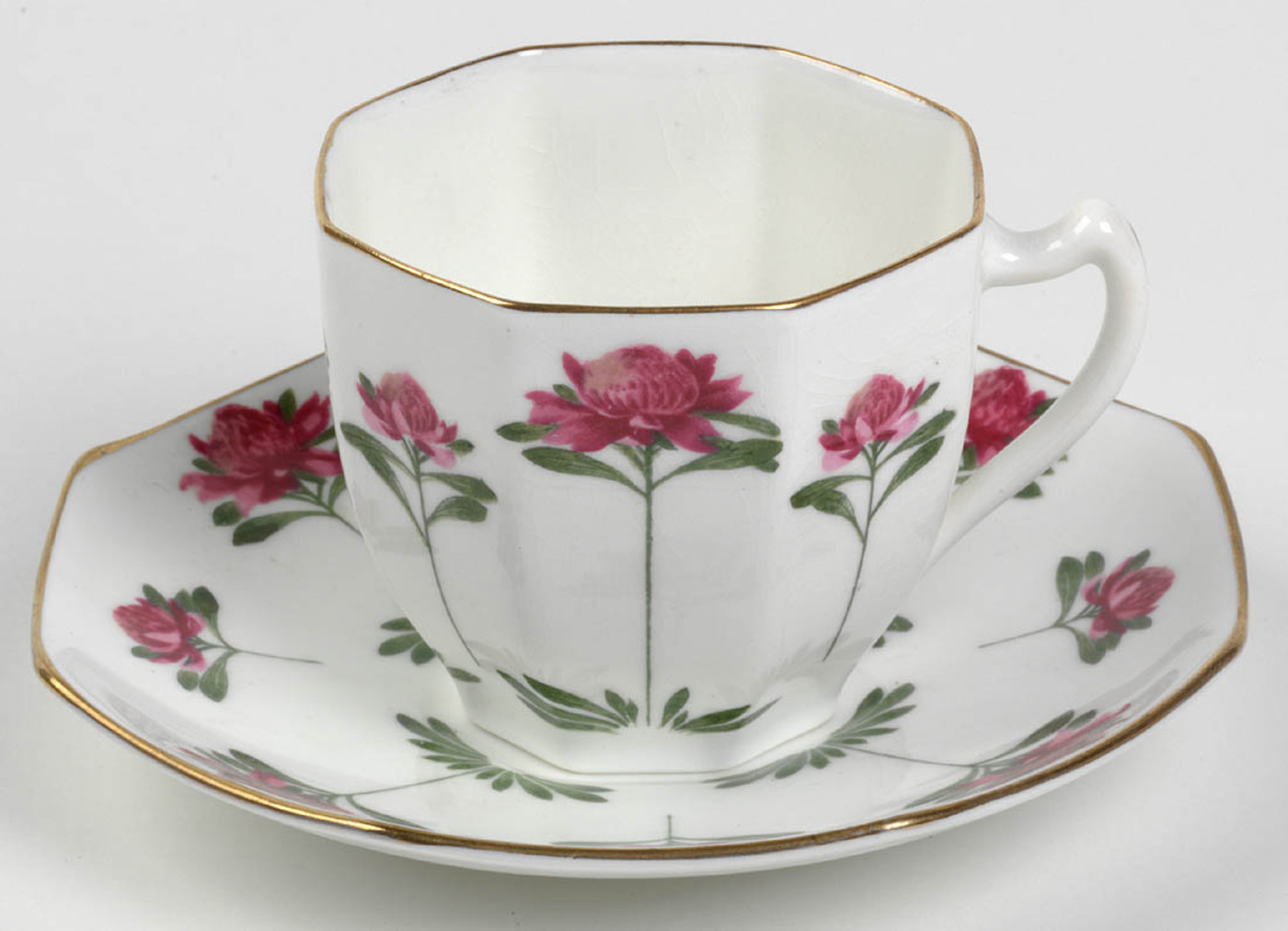
Royal Doulton "Waratah" pattern, after 1922, a local flower to appeal to the Australian market.

Flowering tends to vary with geographic location and climatic differences, occurring from early August in coastal Queensland and up to December in Tasmania. Waratahs have a short flowering period in one location, although varieties can be selected to ensure a reasonable spread. It has been shown that in a population of 1000 seedlings where the total flowering time was five weeks, the spread was so that 10% flowered in week one and 10% in week five. Much variation was accounted for by varietal differences with plants of the one variety flowering at much the same time. Generally, waratahs flower over a 4–6 week period in spring (September–October) in the Sydney region, but later in cooler areas.

== Cultural references ==
Indigenous Tharawal peoples from around the Cronulla region of southern Sydney use the waratah medicinally. Placing the flowers into a bowl of water so that the nectar can be soaked out, the flower water is then drunk for pleasure (for its strengthening effect and for curing illnesses in children and the elderly).

The botanical journal Telopea is named after the genus, as is the western Sydney suburb of Telopea, New South Wales.

Neptune Oil Company used the waratah as a brand for its motor spirit from the late 1910s until being phased out in the 1940s.

Telopea speciosissima is the floral emblem of the state of New South Wales and several organisations in the state, including the New South Wales Waratahs rugby team and Grace Bros (now Myer). Waratah is also the name of the Sydney Trains A set, a class of electric multiple unit trains operated by Sydney Trains in Sydney. In 2009, the Premier of New South Wales, Nathan Rees, commissioned a state logo based on the floral emblem. The resultant logo design has been criticised as resembling a lotus rather than the New South Wales waratah.
