= Cylindrocarpon =

Scientific classification
- Domain: Eukaryota
- Kingdom: Fungi
- Division: Ascomycota
- Class: Sordariomycetes
- Order: Hypocreales
- Family: Nectriaceae
- Genus: Cylindrocarpon; Wollenw. 1913

Species
- See text

Genus of fungi

Cylindrocarpon is a genus of fungi. Many of the species in this genus are plant pathogens.

== Species ==
- Cylindrocarpon abuense
- Cylindrocarpon aequatoriale
- Cylindrocarpon amamiense
- Cylindrocarpon angustum
- Cylindrocarpon aquaticum
- Cylindrocarpon austrodestructans
- Cylindrocarpon bambusicola
- Cylindrocarpon bonaerense
- Cylindrocarpon bondarzevii
- Cylindrocarpon boninense
- Cylindrocarpon bulborum
- Cylindrocarpon candidum
- Cylindrocarpon carneum
- Cylindrocarpon castaneae
- Cylindrocarpon castaneicola
- Cylindrocarpon cedri
- Cylindrocarpon chiayiense
- Cylindrocarpon chichiense
- Cylindrocarpon chlamydospora
- Cylindrocarpon cochinchinense
- Cylindrocarpon colchicum
- Cylindrocarpon congoense
- Cylindrocarpon curtum
- Cylindrocarpon decumbens
- Cylindrocarpon didymum
- Cylindrocarpon effusum
- Cylindrocarpon eristaviae
- Cylindrocarpon faginatum
- Cylindrocarpon formicarium
- Cylindrocarpon fractum
- Cylindrocarpon fraxini
- Cylindrocarpon fusiforme
- Cylindrocarpon gymnosporangii
- Cylindrocarpon hederae
- Cylindrocarpon heptaseptatum
- Cylindrocarpon hydrophilum
- Cylindrocarpon ianthothele
- Cylindrocarpon indicum
- Cylindrocarpon juglandina
- Cylindrocarpon kantschavelii
- Cylindrocarpon kaspense
- Cylindrocarpon kolesnikowii
- Cylindrocarpon lichenicola
- Cylindrocarpon liriodendri
- Cylindrocarpon luteoviride
- Cylindrocarpon macroconidialis
- Cylindrocarpon macrodidymum
- Cylindrocarpon macrosporum
- Cylindrocarpon magnusianum
- Cylindrocarpon mangiferarum
- Cylindrocarpon mirum
- Cylindrocarpon musae
- Cylindrocarpon neblinense
- Cylindrocarpon obclavatum
- Cylindrocarpon obtusisporum
- Cylindrocarpon obtusiusculum
- Cylindrocarpon orchidearum
- Cylindrocarpon orthosporum
- Cylindrocarpon ovale
- Cylindrocarpon ovatum
- Cylindrocarpon panacis
- Cylindrocarpon pauciseptatum
- Cylindrocarpon peronosporae
- Cylindrocarpon pineum
- Cylindrocarpon pini
- Cylindrocarpon pithyusae
- Cylindrocarpon proliferum
- Cylindrocarpon rhodospermum
- Cylindrocarpon rosae
- Cylindrocarpon roseum
- Cylindrocarpon rugulosum
- Cylindrocarpon sagittariae
- Cylindrocarpon schischkinae
- Cylindrocarpon sinuatophorum
- Cylindrocarpon stilbophilum
- Cylindrocarpon suballantoideum
- Cylindrocarpon supersimplex
- Cylindrocarpon theobromicola
- Cylindrocarpon tokyoense
- Cylindrocarpon ugandense
- Cylindrocarpon ukolayi
- Cylindrocarpon uniseptatum
- Cylindrocarpon vaginae

Formerly; Cylindrocarpon destructans = Nectria radicicola
