= Nectria radicicola =

Scientific classification
- Kingdom: Fungi
- Division: Ascomycota
- Class: Sordariomycetes
- Order: Hypocreales
- Family: Nectriaceae
- Genus: Nectria
- Species: N. radicicola

Binomial name
- Nectria radicicola Gerlach & L. Nilsson (1963)

Synonyms
- Cylindrocarpon destructans Cylindrocarpon radicicola Fusarium rhizogenum Neonectria radicicola Ramularia destructans Septocylindrium aderholdii Ilyonectria radicicola

Species of fungus

Nectria radicicola is a plant pathogen that is the causal agent of root rot and rusty root. Substrates include ginseng and Narcissus. It is also implicated in the black foot disease of grapevine. It is of the genus Nectria and the family Nectriaceae. N. radicicola is recognizable due to its unique anatomy, morphology, and the formation of its anamorph Cylindrocarpon destructans.

== Distribution and habitat ==
N. radicicola is currently distributed evenly alongside its primary substrates American ginseng, Panax quinquefolius, and Korean ginseng, Panax ginseng. It occurs throughout North America and continental Asia, primarily Korea and China. It can alternate between growing with a host or remaining dormant as chlamydospores for years at a time if none is present. Because the spores are able to effectively overwinter in plant debris and soil, N. radicicola is not limited by seasonally colder climate conditions.

== Life cycle ==
N. radicicola is a species complex of organisms which target the roots of various species of ginseng, grapevines, and some young trees as their primary substrate. The primary vector of infection are the chlamydospores which might survive for years in the soil before detecting and subsequently infecting a new host organism. Upon infecting the host organism hyphae begin to grow inter and intracellularly which subsequently causes the plant tissues to begin to rot. More chlamydospores will form once the hyphae reach the surface of the host tissue where micro and macronidia will sprout and release the spores.

== Symptoms of infection of host plants ==
=== Root rot ===
After contracting root rot from N. radicicola, the plant will begin to wilt and eventually become discolored, transitioning from red-orange to brown-black with an accompanying strong odor resulting from the rot. The discoloration and odor may be localized only to lesions on the base of the stem and roots or spread across most of the plant. The roots will eventually dry out and become scaly and shriveled. In time the infection may invite secondary infections to take hold in addition to that from the N. radicicola from non-pathogenic sources.

=== Rusty root ===
Rusty root usually presents as slightly raised rust-colored spots at the crown of the taproot which will then spread to cover part or all of the root. The symptoms are only present on the surface of the root however and the discolored spots can be scraped off to reveal healthy tissue beneath. Rusty root is a less severe disease than root rot, with a much lower chance of inflicting serious long-lasting damage or death on the host plant and is associated with the less aggressive strains of the N. radicicola complex.

== Newly burgeoning research ==
=== Double-stranded RNA makeup and virality ===
Research has shown that the virality of the N. radicicola is variable and highly dependent on the makeup of the double stranded RNA within the genotype. Phenotypic features which were closely related to virality such as laccase activity and sporulation were highly dependent on the amount and type of dsRNA present in the genome. This may indicate that the size of dsRNA present in a strain is a key indicator for viral success in different strains of the N. radicicola population.

=== Possible species separation between rusty root and root rot development ===
It has been observed that rusty root and root rot may either be inflicted on host plants, specifically various forms of ginseng, after contracting N. radicicola. Due to the increased severity of a root rot infection over rusty root, the strains which cause root rot are considered to be the more aggressive of the variations. New research suggests that the symptoms may actually arise from two different species rather than just the N. radicicola but rather that It has been observed that rusty root and root rot may either be inflicted on host plants, specifically ginseng, after contracting N. radicicola and due to the added severity, the strains which cause root rot are considered the more aggressive of the variations. Research suggests that the symptoms may actually arise from two different species rather than just the N. radicicola. Ilyonectria mors-panacis may be responsible for the root rot while the N. radicicola might only result in the observed rusty root. As the name suggests, Ilyonectria mors-panacis is closely related to Nectria radicicola, also known as Ilyonectria radicicola, but the genetic discrepancies between plants observed with root rot and rusty root are significant enough that what was thought to be merely different strains might actually be classified as arising from two different species of fungus.

== Bibliography ==
- Boerema, G. H.; Hamers, Maria E. C. (May 1989). "Check-list for scientific names of common parasitic fungi. Series 3b: Fungi on bulbs: Amaryllidaceae and Iridaceae". Netherlands Journal of Plant Pathology. 95 (S3): 1–29. Bibcode:1989EJPP...95....1B. doi:10.1007/BF01981520. S2CID 9422139.
