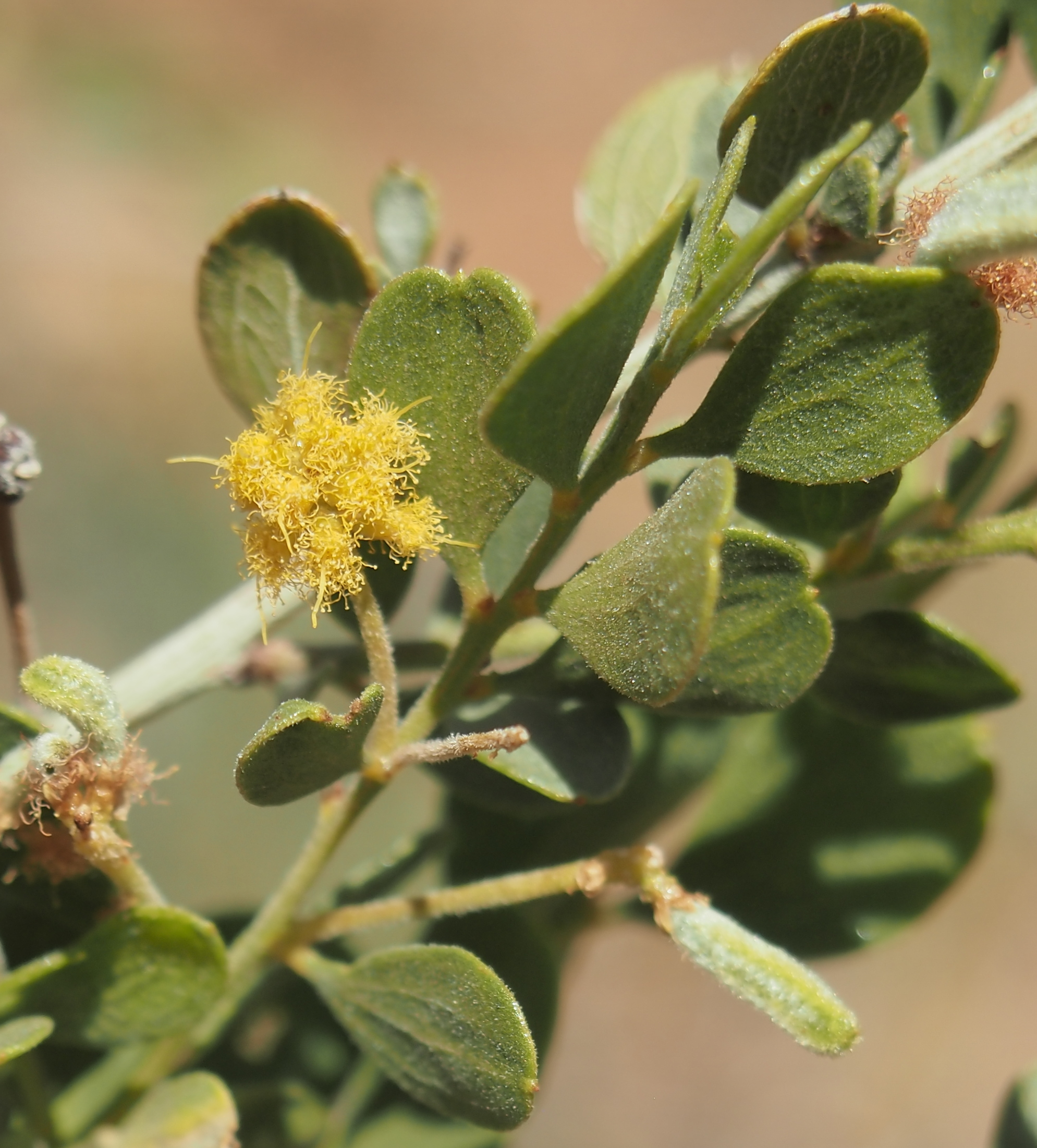
- Flowers and foliage

Scientific classification
- Kingdom: Plantae
- Clade: Tracheophytes
- Clade: Angiosperms
- Clade: Eudicots
- Clade: Rosids
- Order: Fabales
- Family: Fabaceae
- Subfamily: Caesalpinioideae
- Clade: Mimosoid clade
- Genus: Acacia
- Species: A. monticola

Binomial name
- Acacia monticola J.M.Black
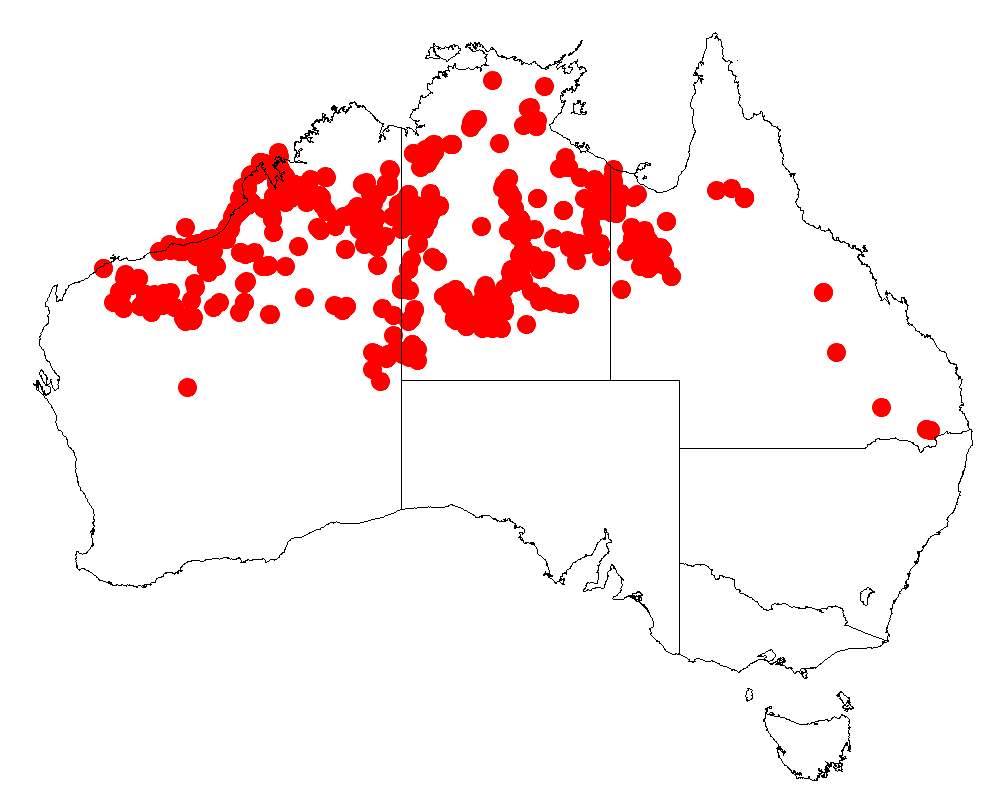
- Occurrence data from AVH

Synonyms
- Acacia impressa F.Muell. nom. illeg.; Racosperma monticola (J.M.Black) Pedley

= Acacia monticola =

Species of legume

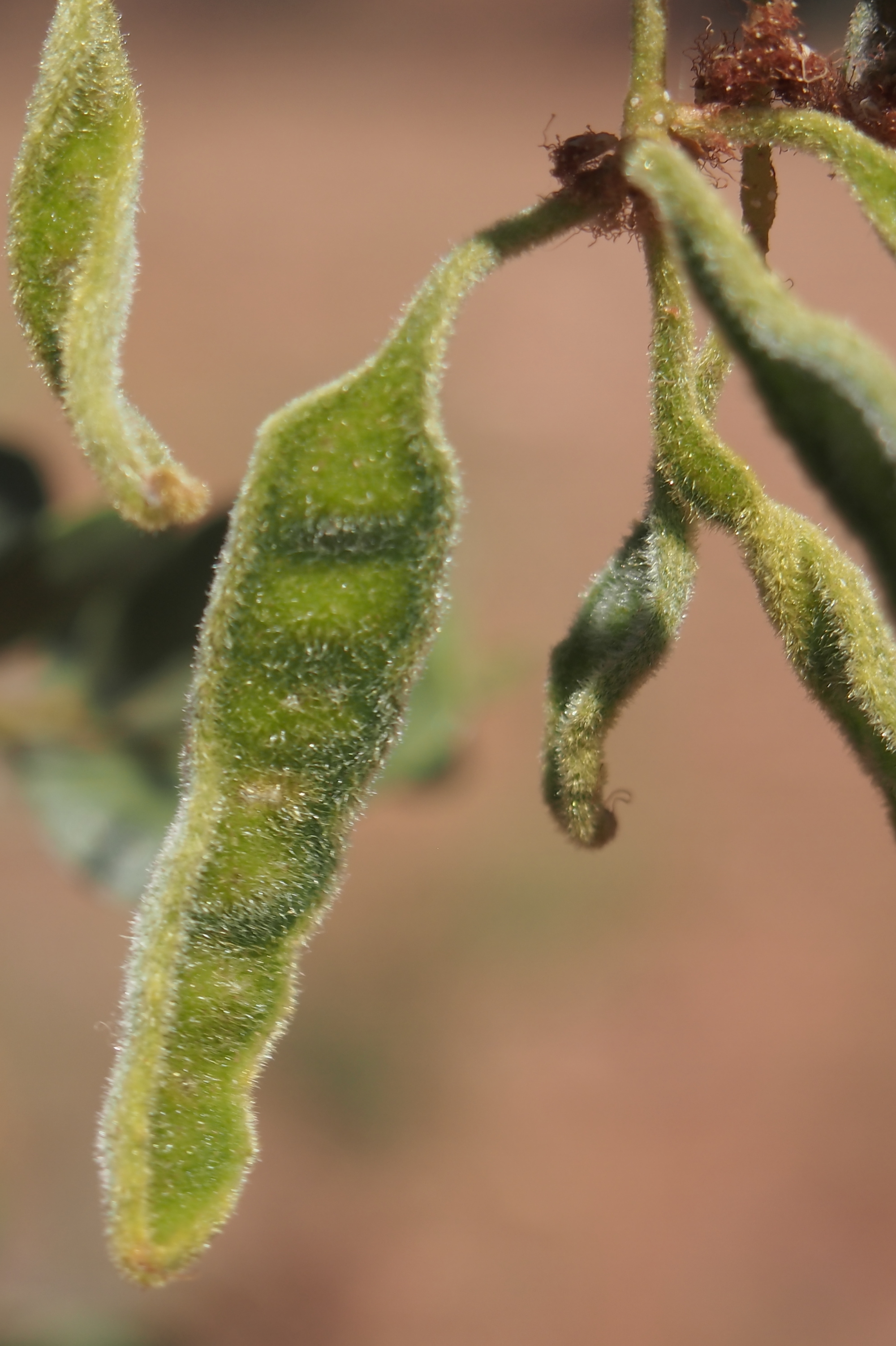
Legume

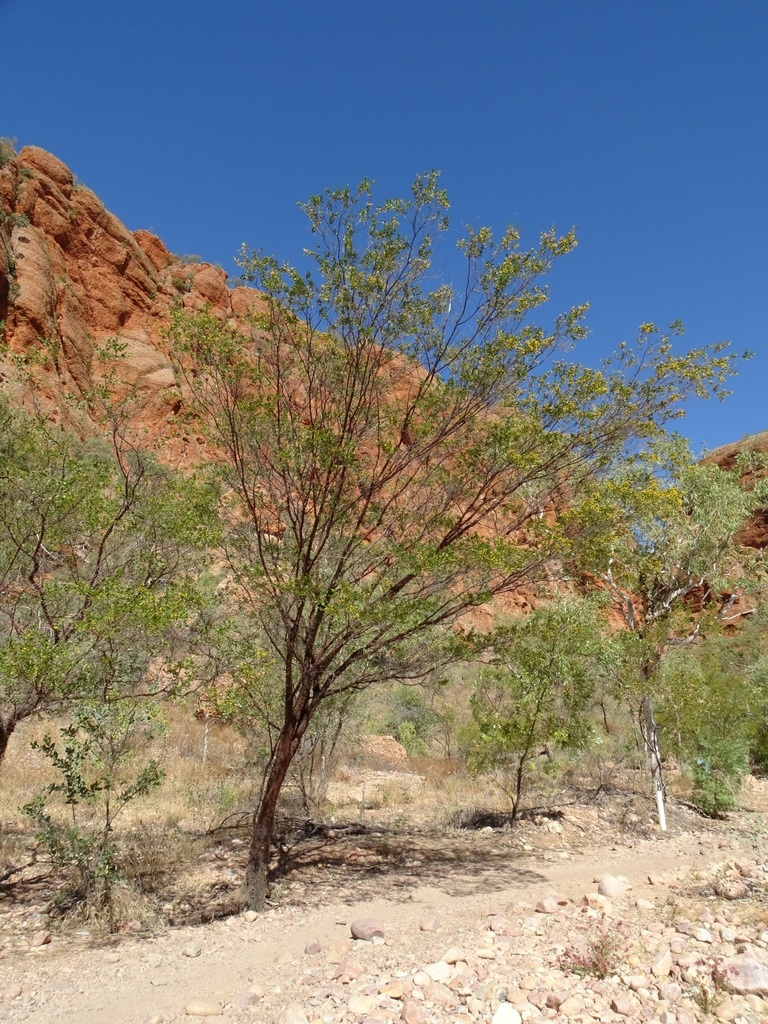
Habit at Echidna Chasm, Purnululu National Park

Acacia monticola, commonly known as curley-bark wattle, Minni ritchi, red wattle, curley-bark tree, hill turpentine or gawar is a species of flowering plant in the family Fabaceae, and is endemic to north-western Australia. It is resinous, sticky shrub or tree with minni ritchi bark, branchlets angled towards the outer end and with wvy ridges, round, broadly egg-shaped, narrowly elliptic, flat phyllodes, spherical to oblong heads of yellow flowers, and narrowly oblong pods raised over the seeds.is a species of plant in the legume family that is native to northern Australia.

== Description ==
Acacia monticola is a resinous, multi-stemmed shrub or small tree that typically grows to a height of 2–8 m (6 ft 7 in – 26 ft 3 in) and has grey or reddish-brown minni ritchi bark and wavy brown branchlets that are angular near the outer ends. The phyllodes are flat, round, broadly egg-shaped with the narrower end towards the base, elliptic or narrowly elliptic, 10–32 mm (0.39–1.26 in) long, 5–15 mm (0.20–0.59 in) wide, with three to five longitudinal veins and a prominent gland up to 3 mm (0.12 in) above the pulvinus. The flowers are light golden yellow and not showy, borne in spherical or oblong heads, 6–10 mm (0.24–0.39 in) in diameter, rarely in spikes up to 22 mm (0.87 in) long on peduncles 10–20 mm (0.39–0.79 in) long. The flowers are not especially densely packed in the heads and are relatively large in size. Flowering occurs from April to August and the pods are narrowly oblong, 18–100 mm (0.71–3.94 in) long, 7–14.5 mm (0.28–0.57 in) wide, leathery, sticky with prominent edges and flat, but slightly raised over the seeds. The seeds are broadly oblong to oblong, 4–6.2 mm (0.16–0.24 in) long and shiny deep brown.

== Taxonomy ==
This species was first formally described in 1859 by Ferdinand von Mueller, who gave it the name Acacia impressa in the Journal of the Proceedings of the Linnean Society, Botany, but that name was illegitimate because it had been given to a different taxon in 1826 by Robert Sweet. In 1937 by John McConnell Black changed the name to Acacia monticola in Transactions and Proceedings of the Royal Society of South Australia. The specific epithet (monticola) means 'mountain dweller'.

In Western Australia, the Yindjibarndi peoples know it as burduwayi, the Ngarluma as burduwari, the Nyangumarta call it kawarr and the Kurrama peoples know it as mangkalangu. In the Northern Territory, the Alyawarre call it awernng, the Anmatyerr errnyengerrny, the Jamindjung, Ngaliwurru and Ngaliwurru people as birrbun, the Kaytetye as mwerlerre or patwerte, the Ngarinman as murlud, in the Pintupi dialect as kawuwarrpa and the Walpiri as matatu, murlurrpa or marlarntarrpa.

== Distribution and habitat ==
Curley-bark wattle is widespread in Western Australia the Northern Territory and central-eastern Queensland, where it grows on red sand, ironstone or lateritic soils in pindan, and on stony plains and rocky ridges in woodland, open shrubland or spinifex. In northern Western Australia it is found in the Central Kimberley, Central Ranges, Dampierland, Gibson Desert, Great Sandy Desert, Little Sandy Desert, Northern Kimberley, Ord Victoria Plain, Pilbara and Tanami and in the Northern Territory in the Burt Plain, Central Arnhem, Central Kimberley, Central Ranges, Channel Country, Daly Basin, Dampierland, Davenport Murchison Ranges, Einasleigh Uplands, Gibson Desert, Great Sandy Desert, Gulf Fall and Uplands, Little Sandy Desert, MacDonnell Ranges, Mitchell Grass Downs, Mount Isa Inlier, Northern Kimberley, Ord Victoria Plain, Pilbara, Pine Creek, Sturt Plateau, Tanami andVictoria Bonaparte bioregions.

== See also ==
- List of Acacia species
