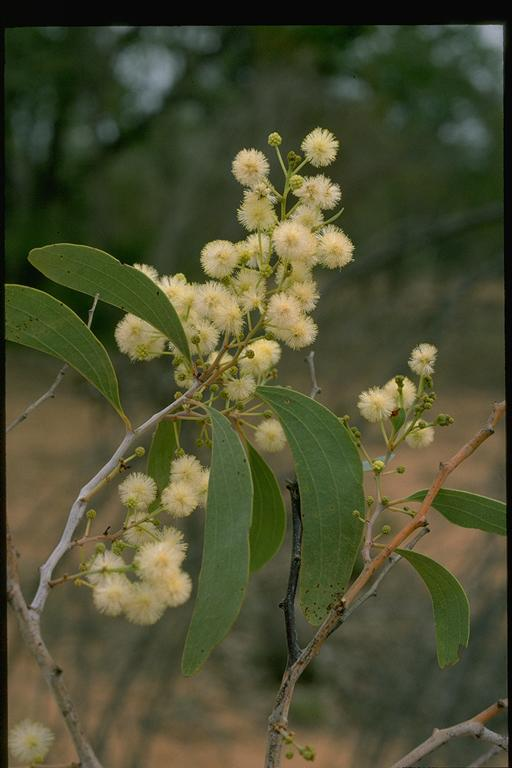

Scientific classification
- Kingdom: Plantae
- Clade: Embryophytes
- Clade: Tracheophytes
- Clade: Spermatophytes
- Clade: Angiosperms
- Clade: Eudicots
- Clade: Rosids
- Order: Fabales
- Family: Fabaceae
- Subfamily: Caesalpinioideae
- Clade: Mimosoid clade
- Genus: Acacia
- Species: A. platycarpa

Binomial name
- Acacia platycarpa F.Muell, 1859
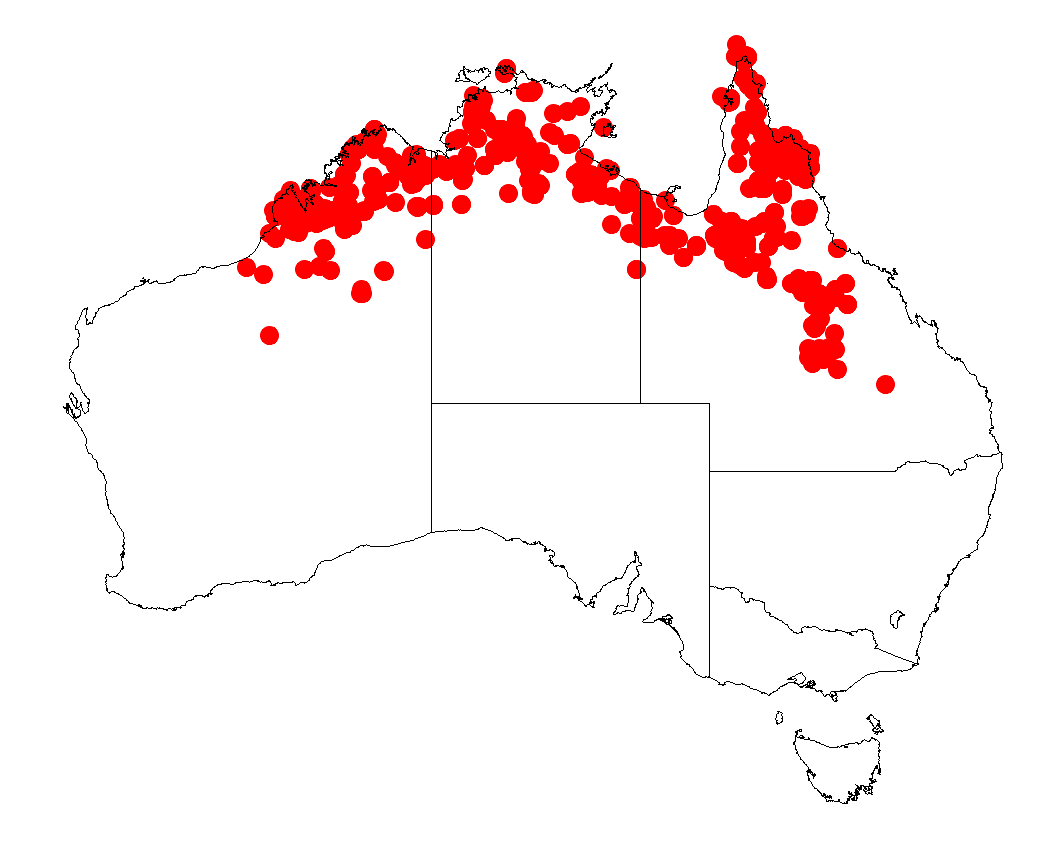
- Occurrence data from AVH

= Acacia platycarpa =

Pindan wattle

Species of legume

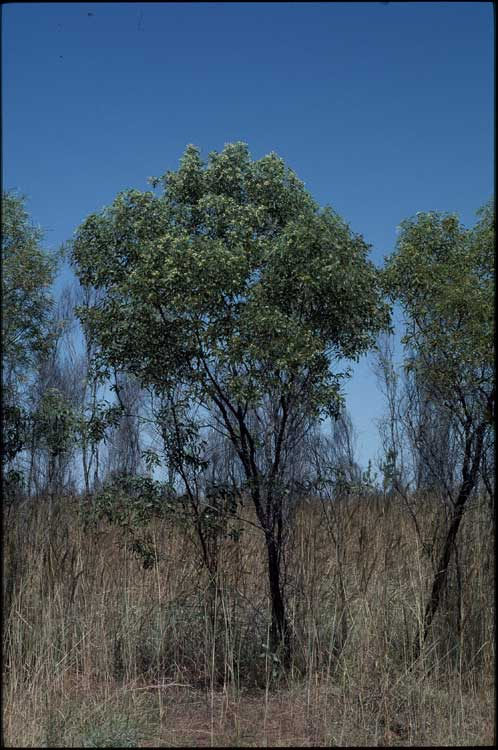
Habit

Acacia platycarpa, commonly known as the pindan wattle or ghost wattle, is a species of plant in the legume family that is native to northern Australia from Western Australia through the Northern Territory to Queensland.

== Description ==
It grows as a shrub or tree, 1.5–10 m in height, with rough or fissured bark. It produces cream to yellow flowers from December to June.

== Distribution and habitat ==
It occurs on red sand soils in pindan, and on dunes, hills and rocky outcrops. In Western Australia it is found in the Central Kimberley, Dampierland, Great Sandy Desert, Little Sandy Desert, Northern Kimberley, Ord Victoria Plain, Tanami and Victoria Bonaparte IBRA bioregions.

== See also ==
- List of Acacia species
