= Gardenia pyriformis =

Scientific classification
- Kingdom: Plantae
- Clade: Tracheophytes
- Clade: Angiosperms
- Clade: Eudicots
- Clade: Asterids
- Order: Gentianales
- Family: Rubiaceae
- Genus: Gardenia
- Species: G. pyriformis

Binomial name
- Gardenia pyriformis A.Cunn. ex Benth.

Species of plant

Gardenia pyriformis, commonly known as malara, native gardenia or turpentine tree, is a species of plant in the coffee family. It is native to northern Australia where it occurs from the Kimberley region of north-western Western Australia, across the Top End of the Northern Territory to northern Queensland.

== Description ==
It grows as a shrub or small tree to 6 m high. It bears small white flowers at various times of year and hard, ribbed fruits.

== Distribution and habitat ==
It occurs on red sand soils, on pindan sand plains, dunes, stony ridges and scree slopes. In Western Australia it is found in the Central Kimberley, Dampierland, Great Sandy Desert, Northern Kimberley, Ord Victoria Plain and Victoria Bonaparte IBRA bioregions.

=== Subspecies ===
- G. p. pyriformis
- G. p. keartlandii (Tate) Puttock
- G. p. orientalis Puttock
