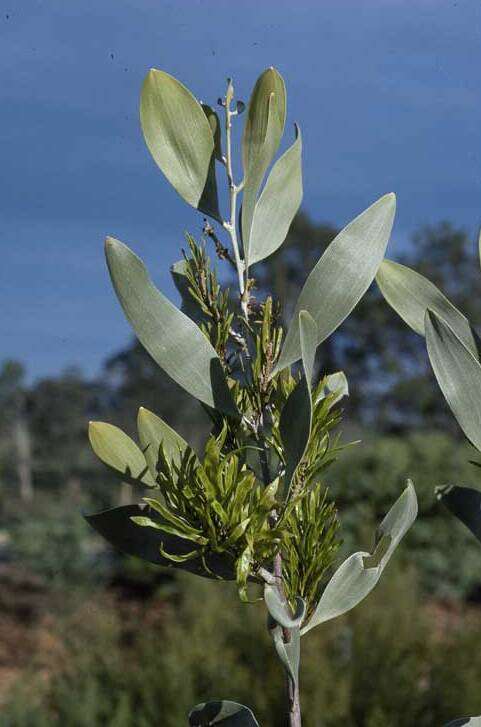
- In the Mount Annan Botanic Gardens

Scientific classification
- Kingdom: Plantae
- Clade: Embryophytes
- Clade: Tracheophytes
- Clade: Spermatophytes
- Clade: Angiosperms
- Clade: Eudicots
- Clade: Rosids
- Order: Fabales
- Family: Fabaceae
- Subfamily: Caesalpinioideae
- Clade: Mimosoid clade
- Genus: Acacia
- Species: A. laccata

Binomial name
- Acacia laccata Pedley
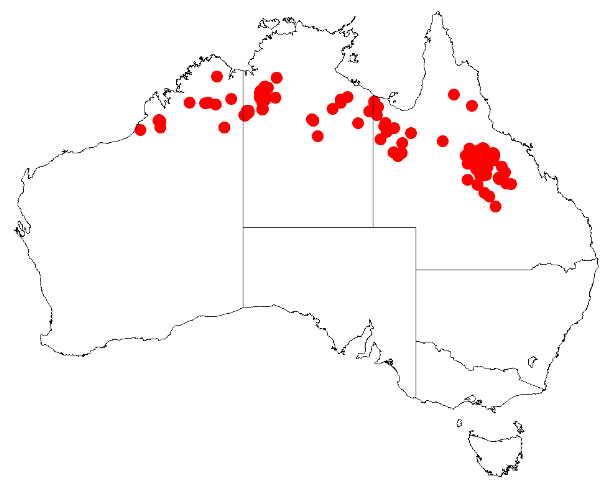
- Occurrence data from AVH

Synonyms
- Racosperma laccatum (Pedley) Pedley

= Acacia laccata =

Species of legume

Acacia laccata is a species of flowering plant in the family Fabaceae and is endemic to northern Australia. It is an erect, spindly shrub with fissured, dark brown bark, narrowly elliptic to very narrowly elliptic, glabrous phyllodes, spikes of yellow flowers and linear, glabrous pods slightly constricted between the seeds.

== Description ==
Acacia laccata is an erect, spindly, varnished shrub that typically grows to a height of 2–5 m (6 ft 7 in – 16 ft 5 in) with dark brown, flaky and fissured bark and terete, sometimes slightly angular branchelts. Its phyllodes are narrowly to very narrowly elliptic, sometimes lance-shaped with the narrower end towards the base, 90–185 mm (3.5–7.3 in) long, 20–50 mm (0.79–1.97 in) wide, with three or four prominent veins and is glabrous when mature. The flowers are yellow, and borne in spikes 20–50 mm (0.79–1.97 in) long. Flowering occurs from May to September, and the pods are linear, 30–70 mm (1.2–2.8 in) long, 6–8 mm (0.24–0.31 in) wide, thinly leathery, glabrous and slightly consricted between the seeds. The seeds are more or less elliptic, 4–5 mm (0.16–0.20 in) long and dark brown.

== Taxonomy ==
Acacia laccata was first formally described in 1964 in the Proceedings of the Royal Society of Queensland by Leslie Pedley. The specific epithet (laccata) means 'appearing varnished'.

== Distribution and habitat ==
This species of wattle grows in sandy soils over sandstone or granite on plains and flats, often in woodland, in the Central Kimberley, Dampierland, Great Sandy Desert, Northern Kimberley, Ord Victoria Plain and Victoria Bonaparte bioregions of northern Western Australia, the Davenport Murchison Ranges, Gulf Fall and Uplands, Gulf Plains, Ord Victoria Plain and Victoria Bonaparte bioregions of the Northern Territory, and far north-western Queensland, north of 23°S.

== See also ==
- List of Acacia species
