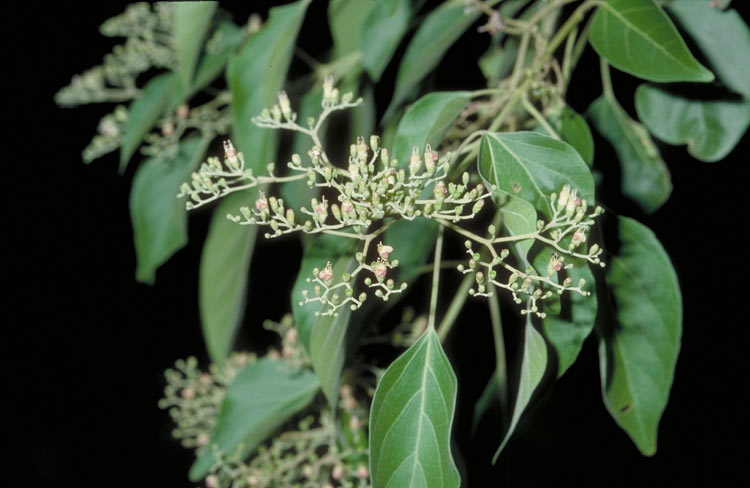

Conservation status
- Least Concern (IUCN 3.1)

Scientific classification
- Kingdom: Plantae
- Clade: Tracheophytes
- Clade: Angiosperms
- Clade: Eudicots
- Clade: Asterids
- Order: Lamiales
- Family: Lamiaceae
- Genus: Premna
- Species: P. acuminata

Binomial name
- Premna acuminata R.Br.

= Premna acuminata =

Species of tree

Premna acuminata, commonly known as the firestick tree, or ngalinginkil in the Bardi language, is a species of plant in the mint family. It is native to Northern Australia where it occurs from Western Australia through the Northern Territory to Queensland.

== Description ==
It grows as a shrub or spreading tree up to 6 m in height. The bark is pale, corky and fissured. It produces cream-green and brown-orange flowers from December to July, followed by black fruits. The wood was traditionally used for making spears and firesticks.

== Distribution and habitat ==
It occurs on sandy and loamy soils, on rocky slopes, coastal flats, flood plains and pindan. In Western Australia it is found in the Central Kimberley, Dampierland, Northern Kimberley, Ord Victoria Plain and Victoria Bonaparte IBRA bioregions.
