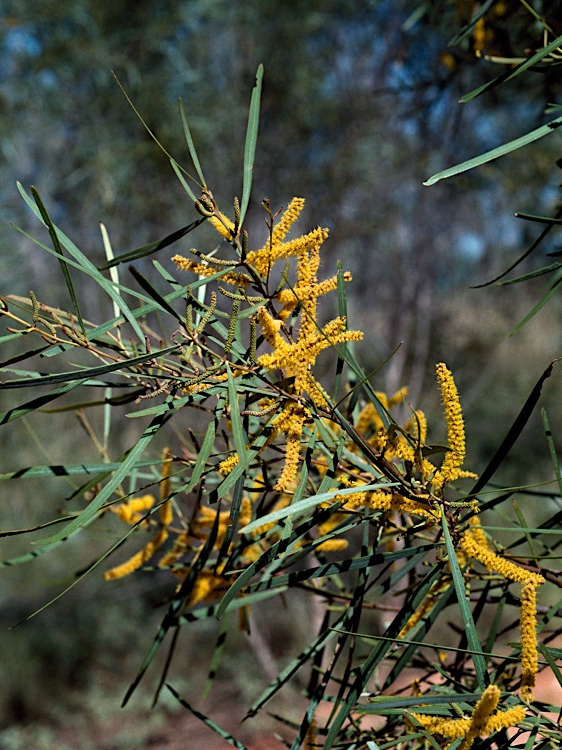
- Near Broome

Scientific classification
- Kingdom: Plantae
- Clade: Tracheophytes
- Clade: Angiosperms
- Clade: Eudicots
- Clade: Rosids
- Order: Fabales
- Family: Fabaceae
- Subfamily: Caesalpinioideae
- Clade: Mimosoid clade
- Genus: Acacia
- Species: A. eriopoda

Binomial name
- Acacia eriopoda Maiden & Blakely
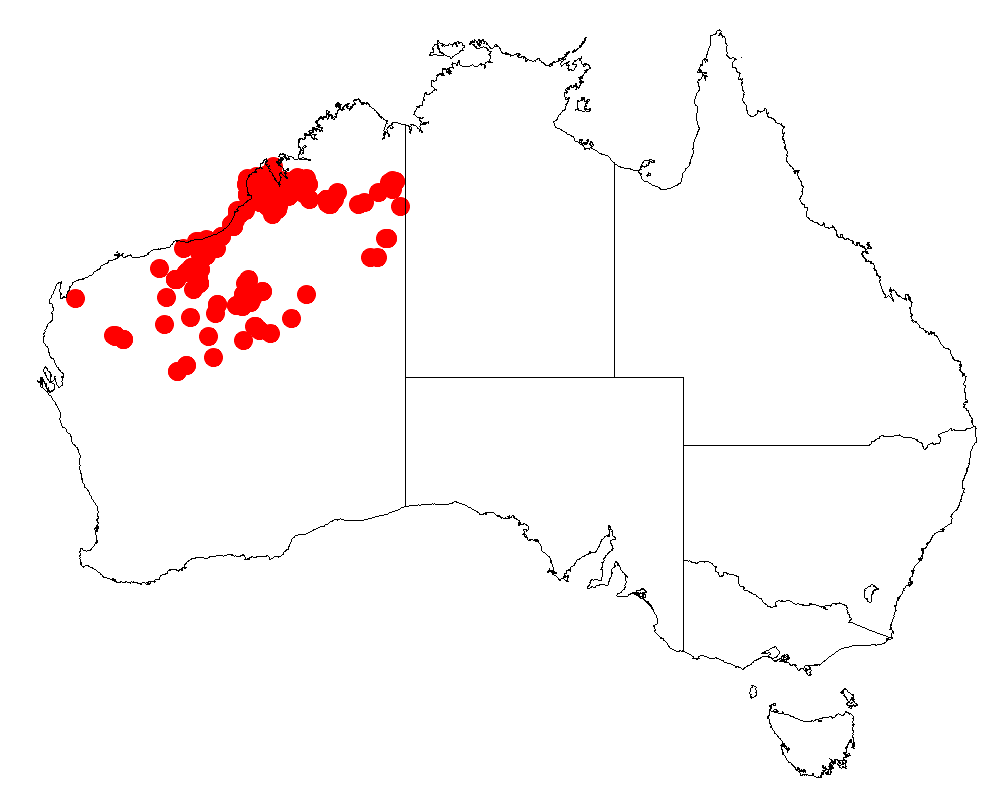
- Occurrence data from AVH

Synonyms
- Racosperma eriopodum (Maiden & Blakely) Pedley

= Acacia eriopoda =

Broome pindan wattle

Species of legume

Acacia eriopoda, commonly known as Broome pindan wattle or narrow-leaf pindan wattle and as yirrakulu to the Nyangumarta people, is a species of flowering plant in the family Fabaceae and is endemic to the north of Western Australia. It is a slender, erect shrub or small tree with smooth to fissured and fibrous, grey-brown bark, linear, leathery phyllodes, spikes of yellow flowers, and thinly woody pods somewhat resembling a string of beads.

== Description ==
Acacia eriopoda is a slender, erect shrub or small tree, 1.5–6 m (4 ft 11 in – 19 ft 8 in) high with smooth to fissured and fibrous grey-brown bark. Its branchlets are light to reddish brown and glabrous. The phyllodes are linear, straight to slightly curved, 70–230 mm (2.8–9.1 in) long and 1.5–5 mm (0.059–0.197 in) wide and leathery with a prominent midvein. The flowers are borne in densely flowered, light golden yellow spikes 15–48 mm (0.59–1.89 in) long. Flowering occurs from April to September and the pods somewhat resemble a string of beads, straight to curved and thinly woody, 60–150 mm (2.4–5.9 in) long and 3–4 mm (0.12–0.16 in) wide, longitudinally furrowed and glabrous. The seeds are dark brown to shiny black, 4–6.5 mm (0.16–0.26 in) long with a pale aril.

== Taxonomy ==
Acacia eriopoda was first formally described in 1927 by Joseph Maiden and William Blakely in the Journal of the Royal Society of Western Australia from specimens collected by Herbert Basedow in 1916. The specific epithet (eriopoda) is derived from the Greek erio- meaning wool and -poda meaning foot in reference to the short, hairy peduncles.

Three hybrids of Acacia eriopoda have been described and the names of the hybrids are accepted by the Australian Plant Census:

- Acacia eriopoda Maiden & Blakely × Acacia tumida var. pilbarensis M.W.McDonald
- Acacia eriopoda Maiden & Blakely × Acacia trachycarpa E.Pritz.
- Acacia eriopoda Maiden & Blakely × Acacia tumida F.Muell. ex Benth. var. tumida

== Distribution and habitat ==
Broome pindan wattle occurs on red sandy soils in the Carnarvon, Central Kimberley, Dampierland, Gascoyne, Great Sandy Desert, Little Sandy Desert, Ord Victoria Plain, Pilbara and Tanami IBRA bioregions. It is associated with pindan habitats. It is mostly found in the Kimberley region with some of the population found in the Pilbara where it is found along watercourses and on low rocky ranges where it grows on deep red sand and alluvial pindan plain in sandy soils.

== Conservation status ==
Acacia eriopoda is listed as "not threatened" by the Government of Western Australia Department of Biodiversity, Conservation and Attractions.

== See also ==
- List of Acacia species
