= Scaevola macrostachya =

Scientific classification
- Kingdom: Plantae
- Clade: Embryophytes
- Clade: Tracheophytes
- Clade: Angiosperms
- Clade: Eudicots
- Clade: Asterids
- Order: Asterales
- Family: Goodeniaceae
- Genus: Scaevola
- Species: S. macrostachya

Binomial name
- Scaevola macrostachya (de Vriese) Benth.
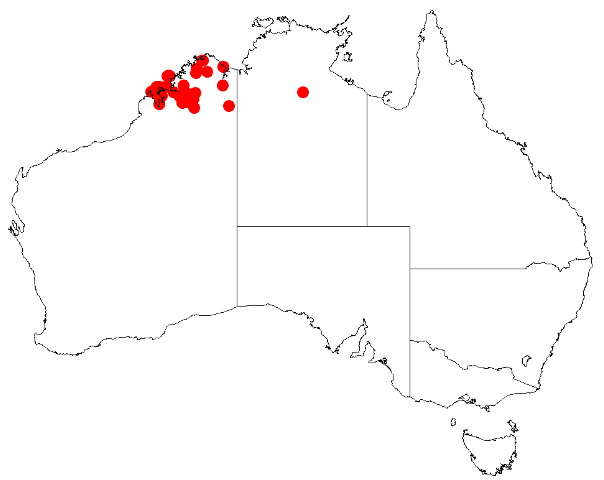
- Occurrence data from AVH

Synonyms
- Merkusia macrostachya de Vriese; Scaevola scabrida W.Fitzg.

Species of flowering plant

Scaevola macrostachya is a species of flowering plant in the family Goodeniaceae and is endemic to the north of Western Australia. It is a spreading shrub with sessile, narrowly oblong to egg-shaped leaves with the narrower end towards the base, spikes of pale blue flowers and cylindrical, glabrous fruit.

== Description ==
Scaevola macrostachya is a spreading shrub that typically grows to a height of up to 60 cm (24 in) and is sometimes covered with long, stiff hairs or is almost glabrous. Its leaves are sessile, narrowly oblong to egg-shaped with the narrower end towards the base, 10–30 mm (0.39–1.18 in) long and 1–5 mm (0.039–0.197 in) wide, sometimes with a few teeth on the edges. The flowers are borne in spikes up to 150 mm (5.9 in) long on the ends of branches, with mostly leaf-like bracts and narrowly lance-shaped to linear bracteoles 5–6 mm (0.20–0.24 in) long. The sepals are rim-like and wavy, about 1 mm (0.039 in) long, and the petals are pale blue, 8–10 mm (0.31–0.39 in) long with very long hairs on the outside and bearded inside. The ovary has two locules. Flowering occurs from March to October, and the fruit is cylindrical, about 3 mm (0.12 in) long and glabrous.

== Taxonomy ==
The species was first formally described in 1850 by Willem Hendrik de Vriese who gave it the name Molkenboeria macrostachya in the journal Nederlandsch kruidkundig archief. In 1868 George Bentham assigned it to the genus, Scaevola as S. macrostachya in his Flora Australiensis. The specific epithet (macrostachya) means 'large flower spike'.

== Distribution and habitat ==
This species of Scaevola grows on sandstone hills and outcrops in the Central Kimberley, Dampierland, Northern Kimberley, Ord Victoria Plain and Victoria Bonaparte bioregions of northern Western Australia.

== Conservation status ==
Scaevola macrostachya is listed as 'not threatened' by the Government of Western Australia Department of Biodiversity, Conservation and Attractions.
