= Acacia camptocarpa =

Conservation status
- Priority One — Poorly Known Taxa (DEC)

Scientific classification
- Kingdom: Plantae
- Clade: Tracheophytes
- Clade: Angiosperms
- Clade: Eudicots
- Clade: Rosids
- Order: Fabales
- Family: Fabaceae
- Subfamily: Caesalpinioideae
- Clade: Mimosoid clade
- Genus: Acacia
- Species: A. camptocarpa

Binomial name
- Acacia camptocarpa Maslin, M.D.Barrett & R.L.Barrett

Species of legume

Acacia camptocarpa, commonly known as Ragged Range wattle, is a species of flowering plant in the family Fabaceae and is endemic to the north of Western Australia. It is a subshrub with a lignotuber at its base and many stems, narrowly elliptic, leathery phyllodes, spikes of golden yellow flowers, and oblong to narrowly oblong, thinly leathery to papery, curved pods up to 80 mm (3.1 in) long.

== Description ==
Acacia camptocarpa is a lignotuberous, many-stemmed subshrub that typically grows to a height of 0.6–1 m (2 ft 0 in – 3 ft 3 in) and has sticky new shoots. Its phyllodes are narrowly elliptic, 60–110 mm (2.4–4.3 in) long and 10–22 mm (0.39–0.87 in) wide with three veins more prominent than the rest. The flowers are borne in one or two spikes 8–15 mm (0.31–0.59 in) long in axils on a peduncle 1–4 mm (0.039–0.157 in) long, the spikes containing many golden yellow flowers. The pods are oblong to narrowly oblong, thinly leathery to papery, mostly strongly curved 30–80 mm (1.2–3.1 in) long and 4–6 mm (0.16–0.24 in) wide containing oblong to slightly elliptic, very dark brown seeds 3.5–4.0 mm (0.14–0.16 in) long and about 1 mm (0.039 in) wide.

== Taxonomy ==
Acacia camptocarpa was first formally described in 2013 by Bruce Maslin, Matthew Barrett and Russell Barrett in the journal Nuytsia from specimens collected by Russell Barrett south-south-west of Kununurra in 2012. The specific epithet (camptocarpa) means "bent, curved or flexible fruit'.

== Distribution and habitat ==
This species of wattle is only known from the Central Kimberley, Northern Kimberley and Ord Victoria Plain bioregions of northern Western Australia where it grows on loam on gentle sandstone slopes in open woodland.

== Conservation status ==
Acacia camptocarpa is listed as "Priority One" by the Government of Western Australia, meaning that it is known from only one or a few locations which are potentially at risk.

== See also ==
- List of Acacia species
