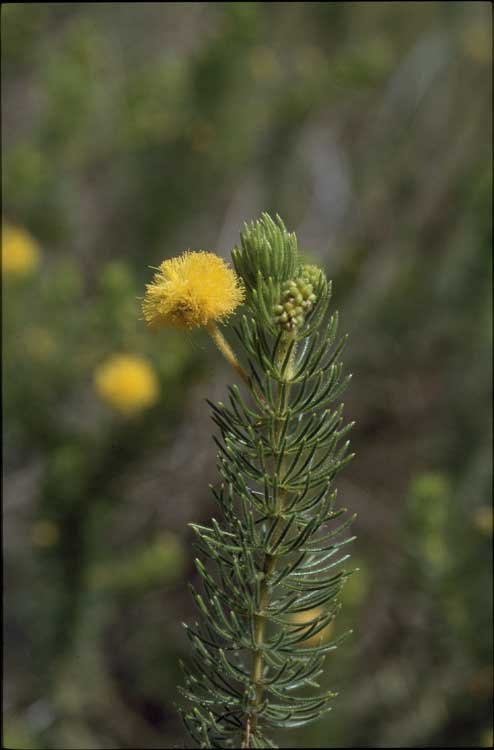

Scientific classification
- Kingdom: Plantae
- Clade: Tracheophytes
- Clade: Angiosperms
- Clade: Eudicots
- Clade: Rosids
- Order: Fabales
- Family: Fabaceae
- Subfamily: Caesalpinioideae
- Clade: Mimosoid clade
- Genus: Acacia
- Species: A. hippuroides

Binomial name
- Acacia hippuroides Heward ex Benth.
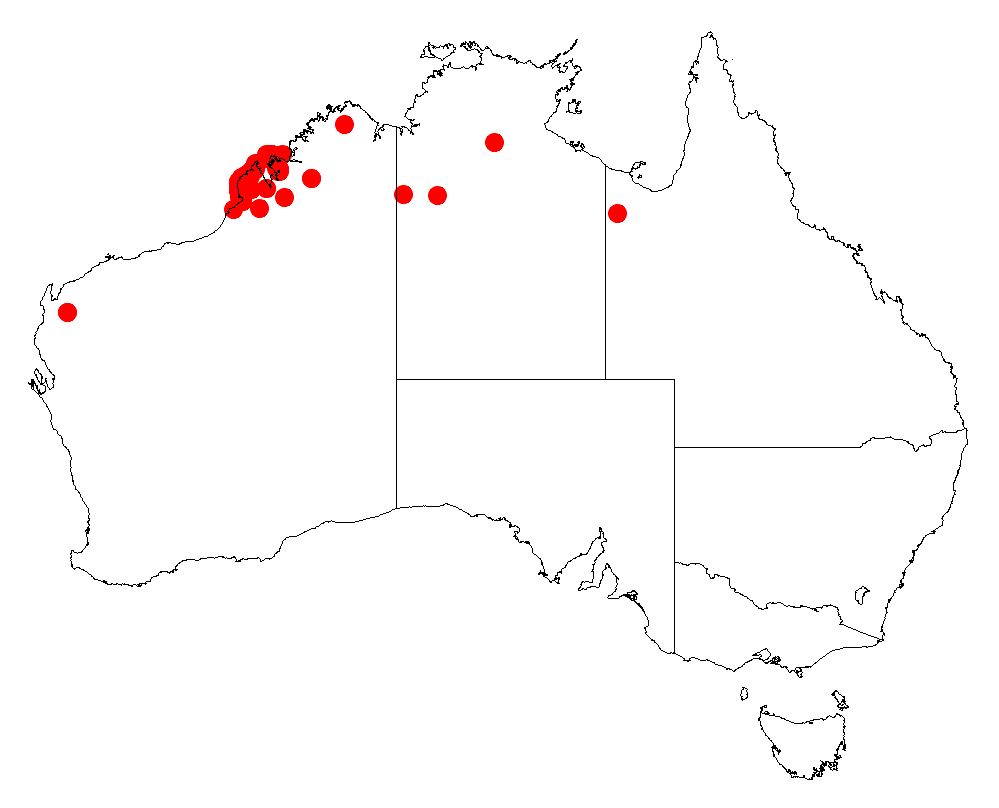
- Occurrence data from AVH

Synonyms
- Racosperma hippuroides (Heward ex Benth.) Pedley

= Acacia hippuroides =

Species of legume

Acacia hippuroides is a species of flowering plant in the family Fabaceae and is endemic to the north of Western Australia. It is a shrub with phyllodes arranged in whorls of twelve to fifteen, spherical heads of golden yellow flowers and sessile, broadly linear, curved pods.

== Description ==
Acacia hippuroides is a diffuse, spreading shrub that typically grows to a height of 0.3–1.6 m (1 ft 0 in – 5 ft 3 in) and has branchlets covered with velvety to woolly yellow hairs. The phyllodes are arranged in whorls of twelve to fifteen, spreading and curved to ascending, 12–20 mm (0.47–0.79 in) long with a small point on the end and covered with soft hairs. There are stipules 1–2 mm (0.039–0.079 in) long at the base of the phyllodes. The flowers are borne in spherical heads on peduncles 15–30 mm (0.59–1.18 in) long, each heads with 30 to 40 golden yellow flowers. Flowering occurs from March to October, and the pods are sessile, broadly linear, more or less flat and curved, about 25 mm (0.98 in) long, 10 mm (0.39 in) wide and crusty to leathery, sticky, glabrous or with dirty yellow hairs. The seeds are about 4 mm (0.16 in) long.

== Taxonomy ==
Acacia hippuroides was first formally described in 1842 by George Bentham in Hooker's London Journal of Botany from an unpublished description by Robert Heward from specimens collected on the north-west coast of Western Australia by John Clements Wickham. The specific epithet (hippuroides) means 'Hippuris-like'.

== Distribution and habitat ==
This species of wattle grows in deep red sand and sandy loam in woodland, shrubland and in seepage areas in the Kimberley region of Western Australia, on the Dampier Peninsula and nearby areas on the Buccaneer and Bonaparte Archipelagos and south to the Thangoo Station, in the Central Kimberley, Dampierland, Northern Kimberley bioregions.

== Conservation status ==
Acacia hippuroides is listed as "not threatened" by the Western Australian Government Department of Biodiversity, Conservation and Attractions.

== See also ==
- List of Acacia species
