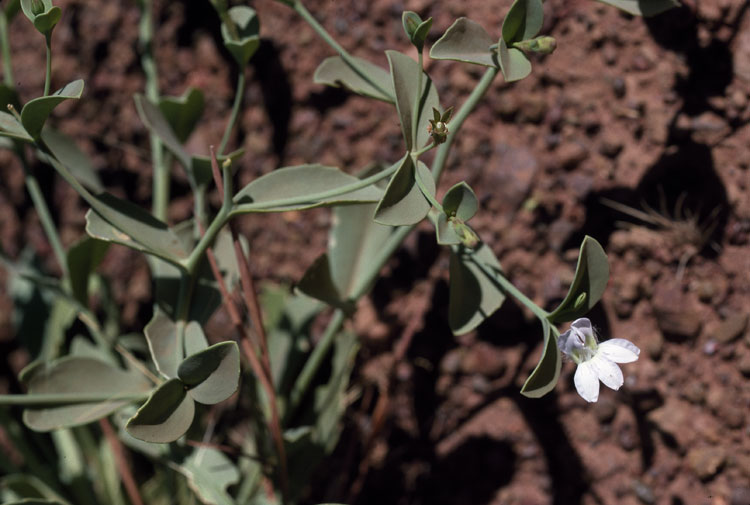
- Near Wave Hill

Scientific classification
- Kingdom: Plantae
- Clade: Tracheophytes
- Clade: Angiosperms
- Clade: Eudicots
- Clade: Asterids
- Order: Asterales
- Family: Goodeniaceae
- Genus: Goodenia
- Species: G. azurea

Binomial name
- Goodenia azurea F.Muell.

= Goodenia azurea =

Blue goodenia

Species of plant

Goodenia azurea, commonly known as blue goodenia, is a species of flowering plant in the family Goodeniaceae and is endemic to northern Australia. It is an erect, dense, spreading or sprawling, glaucous, perennial herb with egg-shaped leaves with the narrower end towards the base, racemes or thyrses of bluish-purple flowers with leaf-like bracts, and oval to cylindrical fruit.

== Description ==
Goodenia azurea is an erect, dense, spreading or sprawling, perennial herb that typically grows to a height of 0.8–1 m (2 ft 7 in – 3 ft 3 in) and has glaucous foliage. The leaves are egg-shaped with the narrower end towards the base and irregular teeth on the edges, up to 70 mm (2.8 in) long and 15 mm (0.59 in) wide. The flowers are arranged in racemes or thyrses up to 500 mm (20 in) long on a peduncle 20–35 mm (0.79–1.38 in) long with leaf-like bracteoles at the base, each flower on a pedicel 2–3 mm (0.079–0.118 in) long. The sepals are lance-shaped, 3–3.5 mm (0.12–0.14 in) long and the corolla is bluish-purple, 12–15 mm (0.47–0.59 in) long, the lower lobes of the corolla 5–6 mm (0.20–0.24 in) long with wings 1–1.5 mm (0.039–0.059 in) wide. Flowering occurs from April to October, and the fruit is an oval to cylindrical capsule 10–12 mm (0.39–0.47 in) long.

== Taxonomy and naming ==
Goodenia azurea was first formally described in 1859 by Ferdinand von Mueller in Fragmenta Phytographiae Australiae.

In 2006 Leigh William Sage and David Edward Albrecht described two subspecies and the names are accepted at the Australian Plant Census:

- Goodenia azurea F.Muell. subsp. azurea has broadly egg-shaped bracteoles mostly less than twice as long as wide and lacking a downcurved tip;
- Goodenis azurea subsp. hesperia L.W.Sage & Albr. has lance-shaped, oblong or elliptic bracteoles usually more than twice as long as wide and lacking a down-curved tip.

The specific epithet (azurea) means "azure" or "deep blue" and the subspecies name hesperia means "western".

== Distribution and habitat ==
Blue goodenia grows in sandy soil with lateritic pebbles in northern central Australia. Subspecies azurea is found in far western Queensland, central Northern Territory and central north-eastern Western Australia. Subspecies hesperia is endemic to Western Australia. It occurs in the Great Sandy Desert, Gibson Desert, Great Victoria Desert, Gascoyne, Pilbara, Dampierland and Ord Victoria Plain bioregions of that state.

== Conservation status ==
Goodenia azurea is classified as "not threatened" by the Western Australian Government Department of Parks and Wildlife, and as of "least concern" under the Queensland Government Nature Conservation Act 1992. Both subspecies are classified as "not threatened" in Western Australia. Subspecies azurea is listed as of "least concern" under the Northern Territory Government Territory Parks and Wildlife Conservation Act 1976.
