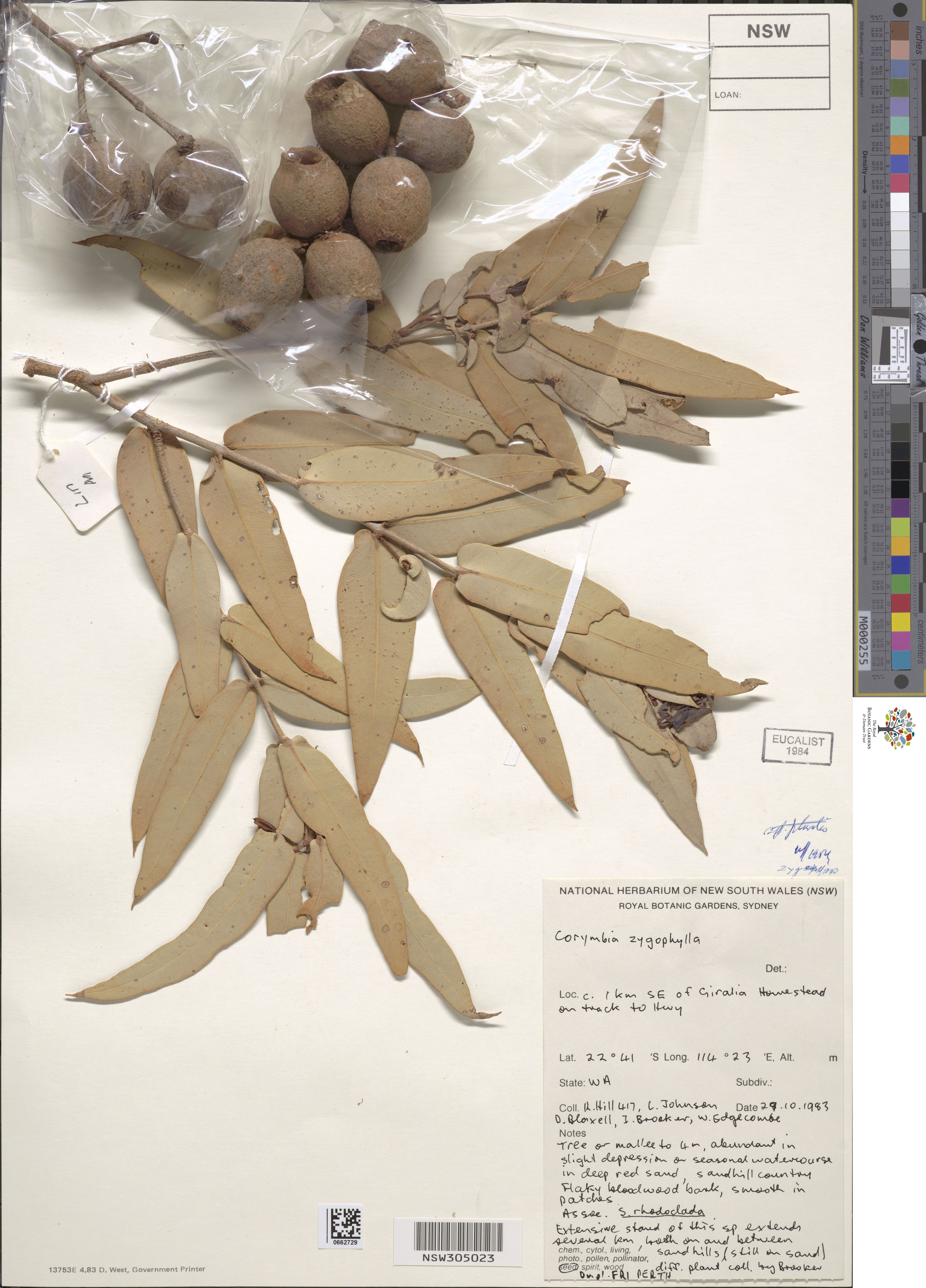

Scientific classification
- Kingdom: Plantae
- Clade: Tracheophytes
- Clade: Angiosperms
- Clade: Eudicots
- Clade: Rosids
- Order: Myrtales
- Family: Myrtaceae
- Genus: Corymbia
- Species: C. zygophylla

Binomial name
- Corymbia zygophylla (Blakely) K.D.Hill & L.A.S.Johnson

Synonyms
- Eucalyptus zygophylla Blakely

= Corymbia zygophylla =

Broome bloodwood

Species of plant

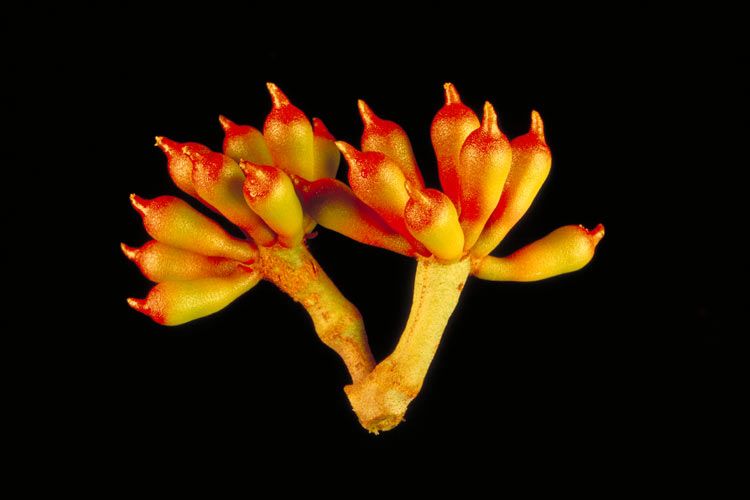
Flower buds of Corymbia zygophylla

Corymbia zygophylla, commonly known as Broome bloodwood, is a species of small tree or a mallee that is endemic to Western Australia. It has rough, tessellated to fibrous bark on the trunk and branches, a crown of juvenile heart-shaped to lance-shaped, stem-clasping leaves, flower buds in groups of three or seven, white flowers and urn-shaped to shortened spherical fruit.

== Description ==
Corymbia zygophylla is a small tree or a mallee that typically grows to a height of 6–9 m (20–30 ft) and forms a lignotuber. It has rough, tessellated to fibrous, pale to dark brown bark on the trunk and branches. Young plants and coppice regrowth have sessile, heart-shaped, stem-clasping leaves that are 35–100 mm (1.4–3.9 in) long, 15–45 mm (0.59–1.77 in) wide and arranged in opposite pairs. The leaves in the crown are juvenile leaves that are heart-shaped to lance-shaped, stem-clasping, the same shade of dull green on both sides, 65–145 mm (2.6–5.7 in) long, 18–60 mm (0.71–2.36 in) wide and arranged in opposite pairs. The flower buds are arranged on the ends of branchlets on a thick, branched peduncle 7–23 mm (0.28–0.91 in) long, each branch of the peduncle with three or seven buds that are sessile or on pedicels up to 3 mm (0.12 in) long. Mature buds are oval, 10–13 mm (0.39–0.51 in) long and 7–8 mm (0.28–0.31 in) wide with a conical to rounded operculum with a small point in the centre. Flowering occurs in December or January and the flowers are white. The fruit is a woody urn-shaped to shortened spherical capsule 18–35 mm (0.71–1.38 in) long and 17–33 mm (0.67–1.30 in) wide with the valves enclosed in the fruit.

== Taxonomy and naming ==
The Broome bloodwood was first formally described in 1934 by William Blakely who gave it the name Eucalyptus zygophylla and published the description in his book A Key to the Eucalypts from specimens collected near Broome in 1905 by William Vincent Fitzgerald. In 1995 Ken Hill and Lawrie Johnson changed the name to Corymbia zygophylla.

== Distribution and habitat ==
Corymbia zygophylla grows in shallow, red sandy soils on dunes and sandplains. It is mainly found in the southern Kimberley region but there are scattered populations in the Pilbara and Great Sandy Desert in the Carnarvon, Central Kimberley, Dampierland, Great Sandy Desert, Ord Victoria Plain and Pilbara biogeographic regions.

== See also ==
- List of Corymbia species
