= Pindan =

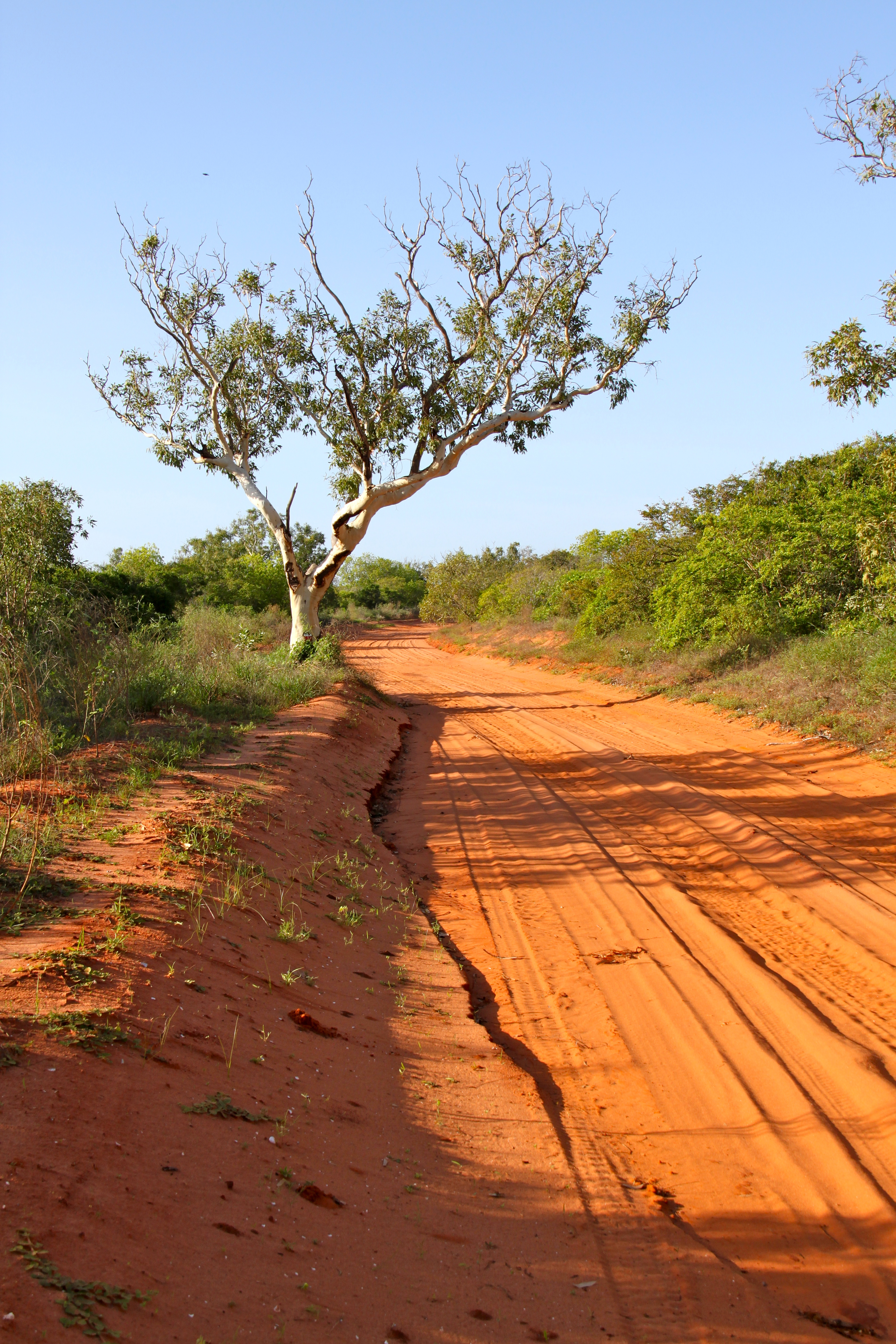
Pindan country

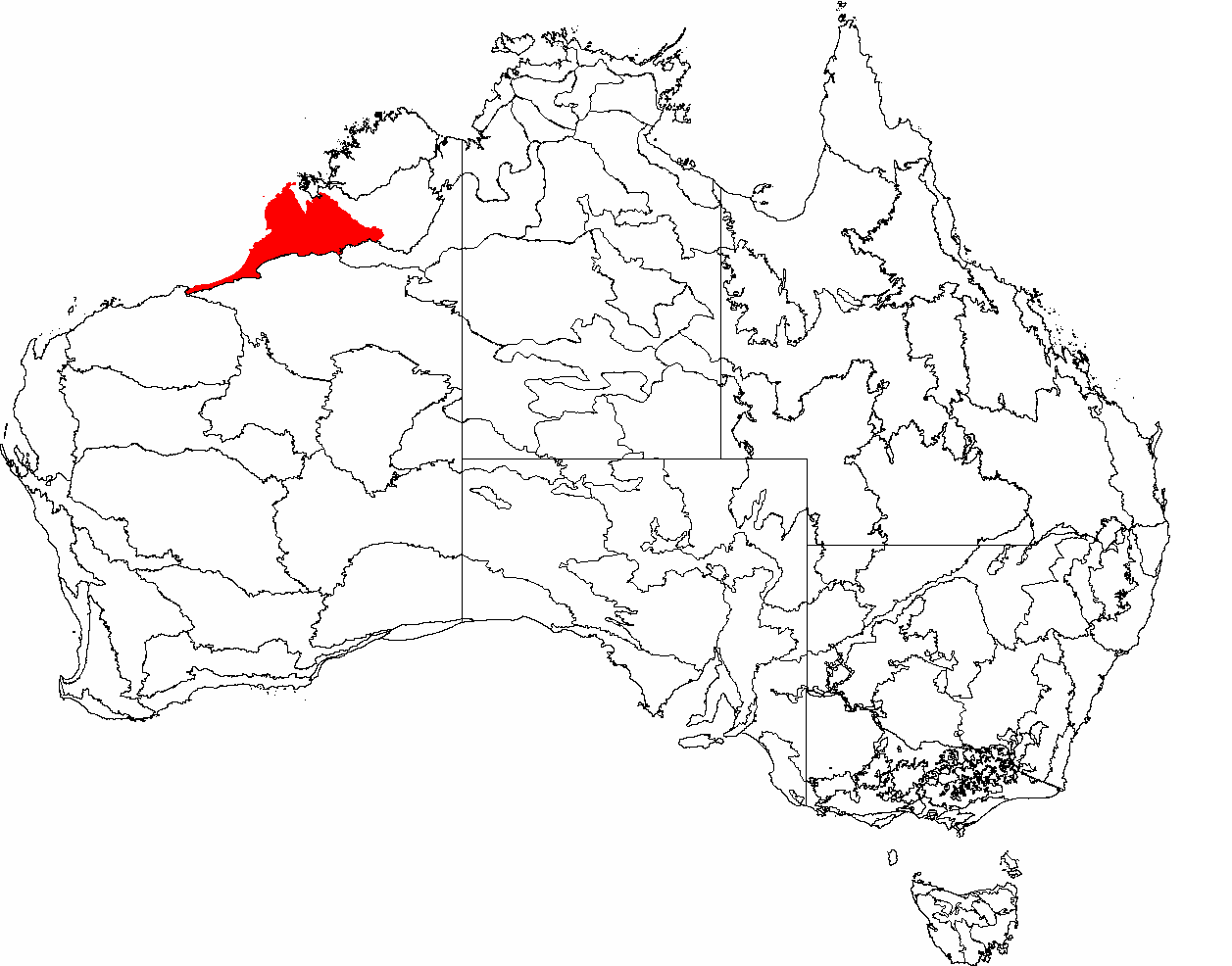
Dampierland (shown in red), the region to which pindan is largely restricted

Pindan is a name given to the red-soil country of the south-western Kimberley region of Western Australia. The term comes from a local language and applies both to the soil and to the vegetation community associated with it.

== History ==
The word “pindan” was first mentioned in print in 1883 by Mr Edward Townley Hardman (1845-1887) in a preliminary appendix to John Forrest’s report on the Kimberley. He stated:

“The only metalliferous deposits as yet observed by me are pindan ironstone, a poor hematite, but in large quantity; and in the Fitzroy gravels, quantities of minute dark heavy grains, which have all the appearance of stream tin. These await further chemical examination, In these gravels, opal, cats-eye, garnet, and amethyst occur, all of inferior quality so far as at present observed.

The 1891 report on the General Description and Physical Geography of the Kimberley District by Government Geologist Harry Page Woodward described the Pliocene geological formation as pindan sands and gravel, often cemented by oxide of iron:

"These sandy soils are largely developed on either side of the Fitzroy River, stretching far away to the Southward, where they form Warburton’s Great Sandy Desert; they are, as a rule, waterless; but, owing to the large rainfall, produce a large quantity of vegetation. On the Ord River there are some small stretches of this country, but never of any great extent."

== Geography ==
Pindan country is geographically restricted to Dampierland, including the Dampier Peninsula and its hinterland, the area around Broome and Roebuck Bay, and a coastal strip extending south-westwards from Roebuck Bay adjacent to Eighty Mile Beach. It is semiarid with a tropical monsoonal climate of hot, wet summers and mild, dry winters. The flat, or gently undulating, land lacks prominent landmarks and is easy to get lost in. The soils are usually red and sandy with a high clay content, low in nutrients, and susceptible both to drought and to waterlogging when wet.

== Flora and fauna ==
Botanically the pindan forms a transitional zone between the wetter monsoon forests of the north Kimberley and the Great Sandy Desert to the south-east, exhibiting a mix of monsoonal and arid species. Structurally it is a low and open woodland of scattered trees, dominated by wattles, with eucalypts and tall shrubs. The understorey contains grasses and herbs. During the long dry season from April to November the annual plants and grasses die off, the country looks parched, and regular wildfires leave stretches of bare and blackened soil, studded with dead shrubs. During the short wet season from December to March there is profuse flowering of the diverse pindan flora, with a wide variety of insects and other animals taking advantage of the seasonal abundance.

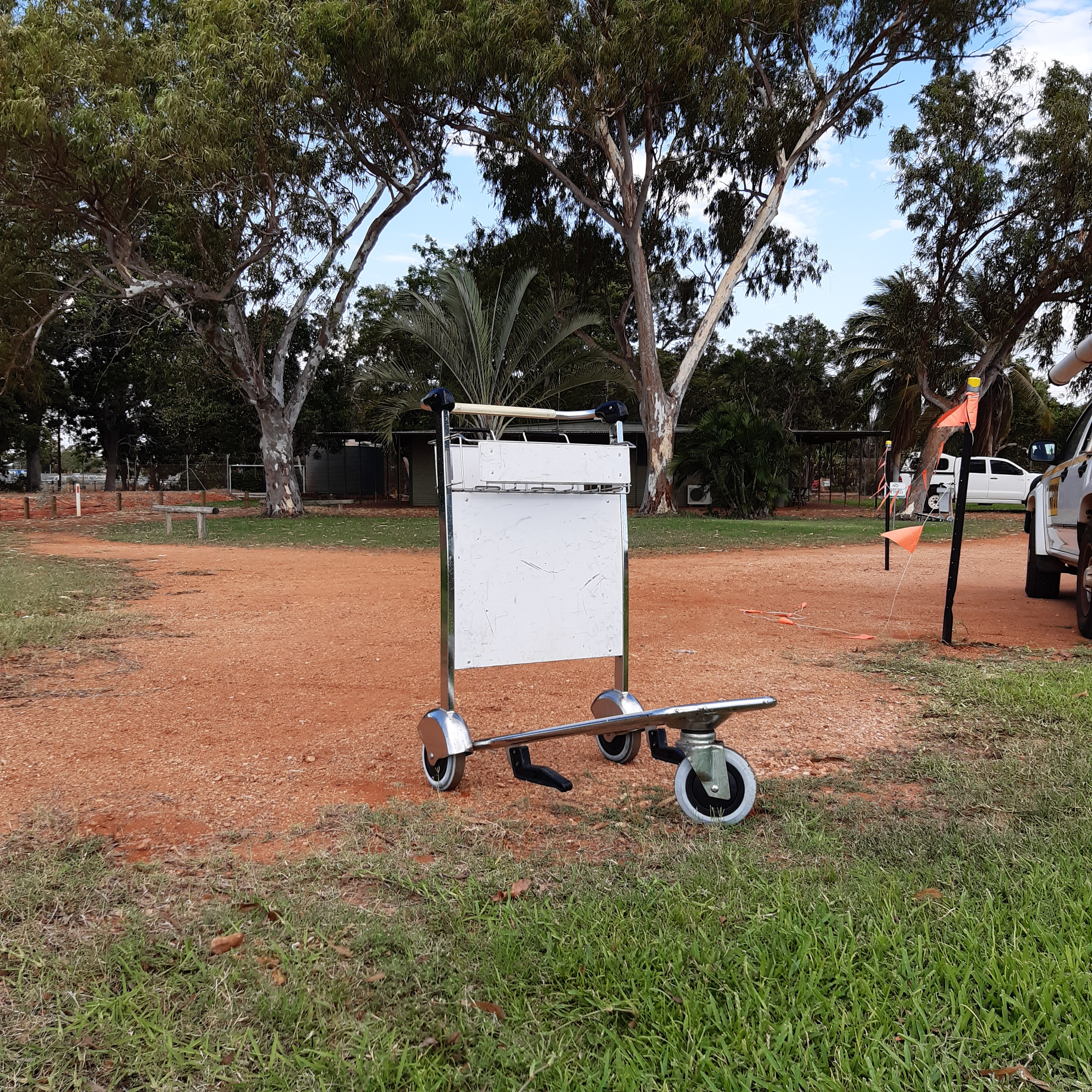
Red soil visible in the parking lot of Broome International Airport, Broome, Western Australia

On higher ground, pindan adopts a more open savanna structure while, on low-lying ground subject to waterlogging during the wet season, paperbarks begin to displace the other trees. Canopy height ranges from 3 m to 8 m; the trees are short and deep-rooted, often with the trunks bent or twisted. In his 1926 book “In Savage Australia” Norwegian explorer Knut Dahl described the pindan as a “crippled forest” in response to the apparent uniformity and stunted appearance of the vegetation.

Typical species of trees and tall shrubs in pindan vegetation are the wattles Acacia eriopoda, A. tumida, A. monticola, A. platycarpa, A. colei, and A. adoxa, and the eucalypts Corymbia greeniana, C. flavescens and C. zygophylla. Other plants include Grevillea wickhamii and G. refracta, Gyrocarpus americanus, Terminalia petiolaris, Lysiphyllum cunninghamii, Ventilago viminalis, Premna acuminata, Hakea macrocarpa, Persoonia falcata, Atalaya hemiglauca, Gardenia pyriformis, Pavetta kimberleyana, Carissa lanceolata, Dodonaea hispidula, Ehretia saligna and Santalum lanceolatum.

Many savanna animals, such as agile wallabies and red-winged parrots reach their southern limits in Western Australia in the strip of pindan that parallels the coast along Eighty Mile Beach.
