= Senna goniodes =

Scientific classification
- Kingdom: Plantae
- Clade: Tracheophytes
- Clade: Angiosperms
- Clade: Eudicots
- Clade: Rosids
- Order: Fabales
- Family: Fabaceae
- Subfamily: Caesalpinioideae
- Genus: Senna
- Species: S. goniodes

Binomial name
- Senna goniodes (A.Cunn. ex Benth.) Randell

Synonyms
- Cassia goniodes A.Cunn. ex Benth.; Cassia neurophylla W.Fitzg.; Cassia oligoclada var. goniodes (A.Cunn. ex Benth.) Domin; Cassia oligoclada var. subsinguliflora Domin; Cassia oligoclada auct. non F.Muell.: Mueller, F.J.H. von (1876); Cassia oligoclada auct. non F.Muell.: Symon, D.E. (December 1966)

Species of legume

Senna goniodes is a species of flowering plant in the family Fabaceae and is endemic to the far north of Western Australia. It is an erect, slender shrub with pinnate leaves with two or three pairs of narrowly elliptic to elliptic leaflets, and yellow flowers arranged in groups with ten fertile stamens in each flower.

== Description ==
Senna goniodes is an erect, slender, softy-hairy shrub that typically grows to a height of up to 1 m (3 ft 3 in). The leaves are 30–50 mm (1.2–2.0 in) long and pinnate, with two or three pairs of leaflets 20–40 mm (0.79–1.57 in) long and 8–12 mm (0.31–0.47 in) wide, spaced 8–15 mm (0.31–0.59 in) apart, on a petiole 4–10 mm (0.16–0.39 in) long. The flowers are yellow and usually arranged in pairs in leaf axils along the branches, on a peduncle 30–50 mm (1.2–2.0 in) long, each flower on a pedicel 10–15 mm (0.39–0.59 in) long. The petals are 8–10 mm (0.31–0.39 in) long and there are ten fertile stamens in each flower, the anthers about 3 mm (0.12 in) long. Flowering occurs from February to September and the fruit is a flat pod 30–50 mm (1.2–2.0 in) long and 8–10 mm (0.31–0.39 in) wide.

== Taxonomy ==
This species was first formally described in 1870 by George Bentham who gave it the name Cassia goniodes in Hooker's Icones Plantarum, from an unpublished description by Allan Cunningham of specimens he collected on the north-west coast of Western Australia. In 1989, Barbara Rae Randell transferred the species to the genus Senna as S. goniodes in the Journal of the Adelaide Botanic Gardens. The specific epithet (goniodes) means "angle-like".

== Distribution and habitat ==
Senna goniodes grows near watercourses along the coast in the Central Kimberley, Dampierland, Northern Kimberley and Victoria Bonaparte bioregions of northern Western Australia.

== Conservation status ==
Senna goniodes is listed as "not threatened" by the Government of Western Australia Department of Biodiversity, Conservation and Attractions.
