= Ptilotus lanatus =

Scientific classification
- Kingdom: Plantae
- Clade: Tracheophytes
- Clade: Angiosperms
- Clade: Eudicots
- Order: Caryophyllales
- Family: Amaranthaceae
- Genus: Ptilotus
- Species: P. lanatus

Binomial name
- Ptilotus lanatus A.Cunn. ex Moq.

Synonyms
- Ptilotus cunninghamii (Benth.) F.Muell. nom. illeg.; Ptilotus lanatus var. glabrobracteatus Benl; Ptilotus lanatus A.Cunn. ex Moq. var. lanatus; Trichinium cunninghamii Benth.; Trichinium lanatum (A.Cunn. ex Moq.) Druce nom. illeg.

Species of herb

Ptilotus lanatus is a species of flowering plant in the family Amaranthaceae and is endemic to northern Western Australia. It is an erect, perennial herb with stem leaves arranged alternately and oval to cylindrical spikes of white or pink flowers.

== Description ==
Ptilotus lanatus is a perennial herb, that typically grows to a height of 25–70 cm (9.8–27.6 in) and has several more or less erect stems. Its stem leaves are arranged alternately, mostly 10–100 mm (0.39–3.94 in) long and 1–10 mm (0.039–0.394 in) wide. There are no leaves at the base of the plant. The flowers are densely arranged in oval or cylindrical spikes with white pink to pinkish-mauve flowers. There are colourless bracts about 1.5–1.8 mm (0.059–0.071 in) long with a prominent midrib and similar bracteoles. The outer tepals are 2.0–3.8 mm (0.079–0.150 in) long and the inner tepals 1.9–3.7 mm (0.075–0.146 in) long. The style is 1.4–1.6 mm (0.055–0.063 in) long and centrally fixed to the ovary.

== Taxonomy ==
Ptilotus lanatus was first formally described in 1849 by Alfred Moquin-Tandon in de Candolle's Prodromus Systematis Naturalis Regni Vegetabilis from an unpublished description by Allan Cunningham. The specific epithet (lanatus) means 'woolly, covered with tangled hairs'.

== Distribution ==
This species of Ptilotus grows on sand dunes in the Central Kimberley, Dampierland, and Great Sandy Desert bioregions of northern Western Australia.

== See also ==
- List of Ptilotus species
