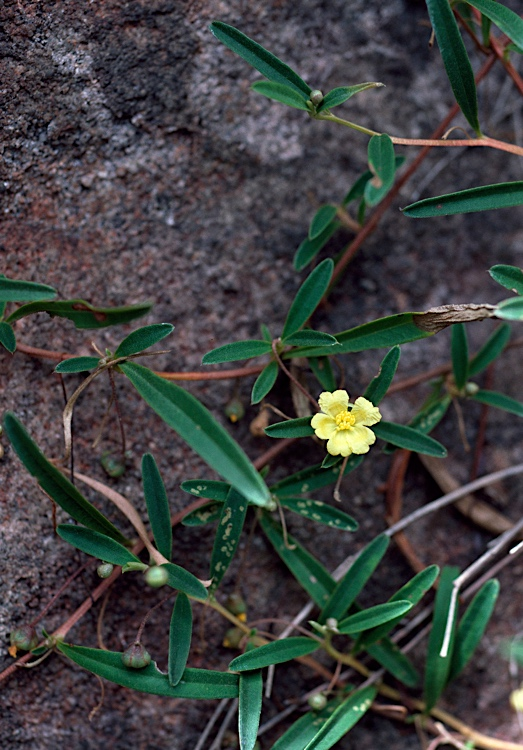
- In Kakadu National Park

Scientific classification
- Kingdom: Plantae
- Clade: Tracheophytes
- Clade: Angiosperms
- Clade: Eudicots
- Order: Dilleniales
- Family: Dilleniaceae
- Genus: Hibbertia
- Species: H. lepidota

Binomial name
- Hibbertia lepidota R.Br. ex DC.

= Hibbertia lepidota =

Species of plant

Hibbertia lepidota is a species of flowering plant in the family Dilleniaceae and is endemic to northern Australia. It is an erect or trailing shrub with scaly foliage, mostly linear to elliptic leaves, and yellow flowers arranged singly or on small groups in leaf axils, with 15 to 24 stamens arranged in bundles around the two carpels.

== Description ==
Hibbertia lepidota is an erect or trailing shrub that typically grows to a height of up to 1.0 m (3 ft 3 in) and has densely scaly branches. The leaves are mostly linear to elliptic, 15–25 mm (0.59–0.98 in) long and 0.5–2.2 mm (0.020–0.087 in) wide, more or less sessile and covered with scales, especially on the lower surface. The flowers are arranged singly, sometimes in groups of up to five near the ends of short side shoots on a peduncle 3.5–8 mm (0.14–0.31 in) long, with linear to lance-shaped bracts 1.1–1.7 mm (0.043–0.067 in) long. The five sepals are joined at the base, the two outer sepal lobes 3.5–4.1 mm (0.14–0.16 in) long and the inner lobes slightly longer. The five petals are egg-shaped with the narrower end towards the base, yellow, 4.4–5.8 mm (0.17–0.23 in) long and there are 15 to 24 stamens arranged in groups around the two carpels, sometimes with up to six staminodes, each carpel with two ovules.

== Taxonomy ==
Hibbertia lepidota was first formally described in 1817 by Augustin Pyramus de Candolle in his Regni Vegetabilis Systema Naturale from an unpublished description by Robert Brown. The specific epithet (lepidota) means "covered with scales".

== Distribution and habitat ==
This hibbertia grows in woodland in sandy or gravelly soil in the Central Kimberley, Northern Kimberley and Victoria Bonaparte biogeographic regions of Western Australia, in Top End region of the Northern Territory and in northern Queensland.

== Conservation status ==
Hibbertia lepidota is classified as "least concern" under the Territory Parks and Wildlife Conservation Act 1976 and as "not threatened" by the Western Australian Government Department of Parks and Wildlife.

== See also ==
- List of Hibbertia species
