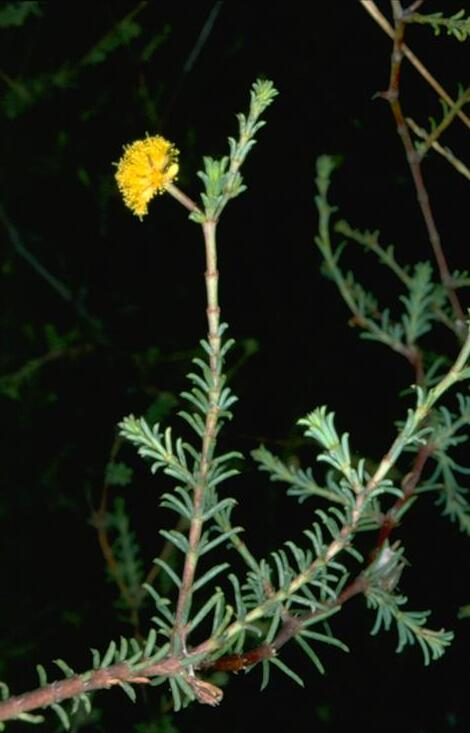
- In North Queensland

Scientific classification
- Kingdom: Plantae
- Clade: Tracheophytes
- Clade: Angiosperms
- Clade: Eudicots
- Clade: Rosids
- Order: Fabales
- Family: Fabaceae
- Subfamily: Caesalpinioideae
- Clade: Mimosoid clade
- Genus: Acacia
- Species: A. galioides

Binomial name
- Acacia galioides Benth.
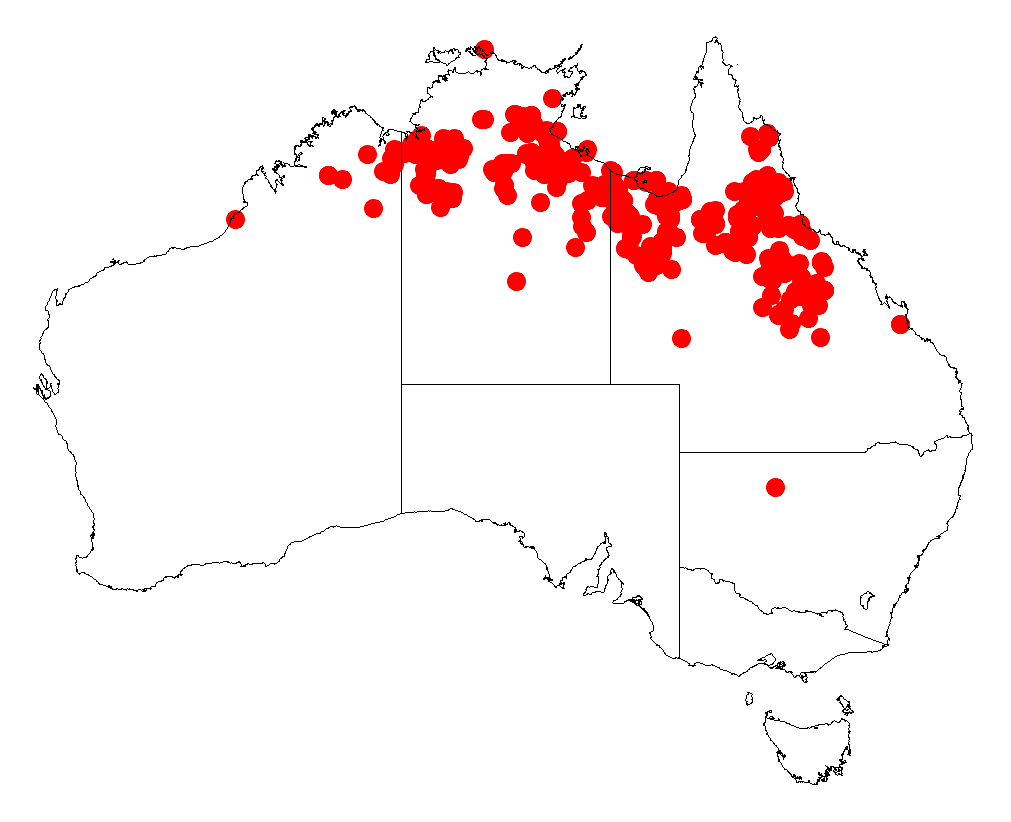
- Occurrence data from AVH

Synonyms
- List: Acacia galeoides K.A.W.Williams orth. var.; Acacia galioides Benth. f. galioides; Acacia galioides Benth. var. galioides; Acacia galioides var. glabriflora (Domin) Pedley; Acacia galioides var. leioclada (Domin) Pedley; Acacia galioides var. typica Domin nom. inval.; Acacia glabriflora Domin; Acacia leioclada Domin; Racosperma galioides (Benth.) Pedley

= Acacia galioides =

Species of plant

Acacia galioides is a species of flowering plant in the family Fabaceae and is endemic to northern Australia. It is a spreading shrub with whorls of phyllodes, spherical heads of yellow flowers and linear pods.

== Description ==
Acacia galioides is a spreading shrub that typically grows to a height of up to 50 cm (20 in) and sometimes has hairy, occasionally glaucous branchlets. The phyllodes are arranged in whorls of five to nine, and are slightly flattened, straight or slightly curved, 2–8 mm (0.079–0.315 in) long and 0.3–0.8 mm (0.012–0.031 in) wide with a short point on the end. The phyllodes have an impressed vein on the upper side, and are obscurely ribbed on the lower surface. The flowers are borne in spherical heads on a peduncle 4–15 mm (0.16–0.59 in) long, each head with 10 to 25 yellow flowers. The pods are linear, straight to curved, up to 50 mm (2.0 in) long, 4–6 mm (0.16–0.24 in) wide and glabrous, with a white, powdery bloom. The seeds are 3.5–5 mm (0.14–0.20 in) long.

== Taxonomy ==
Acacia galioides was first formally described in 1842 by George Bentham in Hooker's London Journal of Botany from specimens collected by Franz Bauer. The specific epithet (galioides) means 'Galium-like'.

== Distribution and habitat ==
This species of wattle grows in sandy and shallow rocky soils in the Central Kimberley, Ord Victoria Plain and Victoria Bonaparte bioregions of northern Western Australia, in the central north of the Northern Territory and in north-western Queensland as far as Clermont and Herberton in the eastern highlands of Queensland.

== Conservation status ==
Acacia galioides is listed as "not threatened" by the Government of Western Australia Department of Biodiversity, Conservation and Attractions, of "least concern" under the Northern Territory Government Territory Parks and Wildlife Conservation Act and the Queensland Government Nature Conservation Act 1992.

== See also ==
- List of Acacia species
