= Goodenia crenata =

Conservation status
- Priority Three — Poorly Known Taxa (DEC)

Scientific classification
- Kingdom: Plantae
- Clade: Tracheophytes
- Clade: Angiosperms
- Clade: Eudicots
- Clade: Asterids
- Order: Asterales
- Family: Goodeniaceae
- Genus: Goodenia
- Species: G. crenata

Binomial name
- Goodenia crenata Carolin & L.W.Sage

Species of plant

Goodenia crenata is a species of flowering plant in the family Goodeniaceae and endemic to north-western Australia. It is a perennial, herb with oblong, elliptic or egg-shaped leaves in a rosette at the base of the plant, and leafy racemes of yellow flowers.

== Description ==
Goodenia crenata is a perennial herb with prostrate or low-lying stems up to 10 cm (3.9 in) long and hairy. Most of the leaves are arranged in a rosette at the base of the plant and are oblong to elliptic, or egg-shaped with the narrower end towards the base, 60–80 mm (2.4–3.1 in) long and 10–20 mm (0.39–0.79 in) wide with wavy edges. The flowers are arranged in a leafy raceme on a peduncle 5–15 mm (0.20–0.59 in) long. The sepals are lance-shaped and hairy, about 4 mm (0.16 in) long and the corolla is yellow and about 15 mm (0.59 in) long. The lower lobes of the corolla are about 5 mm (0.20 in) long with wings about 2 mm (0.079 in) wide. Flowering occurs from May to July and the fruit is an oval capsule about 6 mm (0.24 in) in diameter.

== Taxonomy and naming ==
Goodenia crenata was first formally described in 2001 by Roger Charles Carolin and Leigh William Sage in the journal Nuytsia from material collected at Glass Hill in the east Kimberley in 1999. The specific epithet (crenata) means "scalloped" and refers to the edges of the leaves.

== Distribution and habitat ==
This goodenia mostly grows near water holes, creeks and rocky outcrops in the Ord Victoria Plain, Central Kimberley and Tanami biogeographic regions of northern Western Australia and the Northern Territory.

== Conservation status ==
Goddenia crenata is classified as "Priority Three" by the Government of Western Australia Department of Parks and Wildlife meaning that it is poorly known and known from only a few locations but is not under imminent threat.
