= Ptilotus johnstonianus =

Scientific classification
- Kingdom: Plantae
- Clade: Tracheophytes
- Clade: Angiosperms
- Clade: Eudicots
- Order: Caryophyllales
- Family: Amaranthaceae
- Genus: Ptilotus
- Species: P. johnstonianus

Binomial name
- Ptilotus johnstonianus W.Fitzg.

Species of herb

Ptilotus johnstonianus is a species of flowering plant in the family Amaranthaceae and is endemic to northern inland Western Australia. It is an erect perennial herb with several stems, linear to lance-shaped leaves and oval or cylindrical spikes of white, pink or magenta flowers.

== Description ==
Ptilotus johnstonianus is an erect perennial herb with several stems, that typically grows to a height of up to 60 cm (24 in), its stems and leaves glabrous. Its leaves are linear to lance-shaped, 7–55 mm (0.28–2.17 in) long and 0.5–2 mm (0.020–0.079 in) wide. The flowers are arranged in oval or cylindrical spikes with bracts 3.0–3.8 mm (0.12–0.15 in) long with a prominent midrib, and similar bracteoles 3.3–3.6 mm (0.13–0.14 in) long. The outer tepals are 5.0–5.9 mm (0.20–0.23 in) long and the inner tepals 5.2–6.0 mm (0.20–0.24 in) long with a tuft of hairs on the inner surface. The style is 1.9–2.4 mm (0.075–0.094 in) long and centrally fixed to the ovary. Flowering occurs in April and May and the seeds are glossy brown.

== Taxonomy ==
Ptilotus johnstonianus was first formally described in 1918 by William Vincent Fitzgerald in the Journal and Proceedings of the Royal Society of Western Australia from specimens he had previously collected. The specific epithet (johnstonianus) honours "the late Mr. Harry F. Johnston, Surveyor-General of Western Australia".

== Distribution and habitat ==
This species of Ptilotus grows in skeletal soils in the Central Kimberley and Dampierland bioregions of northern inland Western Australia.

== Conservation status ==
Ptilotus johnstonianus is listed as "not threatened" by the Government of Western Australia Department of Biodiversity, Conservation and Attractions.

== See also ==
- List of Ptilotus species
