= Goodenia brachypoda =

Scientific classification
- Kingdom: Plantae
- Clade: Tracheophytes
- Clade: Angiosperms
- Clade: Eudicots
- Clade: Asterids
- Order: Asterales
- Family: Goodeniaceae
- Genus: Goodenia
- Species: G. brachypoda

Binomial name
- Goodenia brachypoda (F.Muell. ex Benth.) Carolin

Synonyms
- Goodenia sepalosa var. brachypoda Benth.

Species of plant

Goodenia brachypoda is a species of flowering plant in the family Goodeniaceae and is endemic to northern Australia. It is a low-lying to upright herb with narrow elliptic to oblong leaves, racemes of yellow flowers with leaf-like bracts at the base, and more or less spherical fruit.

== Description ==
Goodenia brachypoda is a low-lying to upright herb with stems up to 250 mm (9.8 in) and foliage covered with soft hairs. The leaves are narrow elliptic to oblong with irregular teeth on the edges, 20–50 mm (0.79–1.97 in) long and 4–13 mm (0.16–0.51 in) wide. The flowers are arranged in racemes up to 150 mm (5.9 in) long, each flower on a pedicel 2–7 mm (0.079–0.276 in) long with leaf-like bracts at the base. The sepals are linear, 3.5–4 mm (0.14–0.16 in) long and the corolla is yellow, 9–15 mm (0.35–0.59 in) long. The lower lobes of the corolla 3.5–4 mm (0.14–0.16 in) long with wings about 0.5 mm (0.020 in) wide. Flowering occurs from July to September and the fruit is a more or less spherical capsule about 3.5 mm (0.14 in) in diameter.

== Taxonomy and naming ==
This goodenia was first formally described in 1868 by George Bentham and given the name Goodenia sepalosa var. brachypoda in Flora Australiensis from an unpublished description by Ferdinand von Mueller. In 1990, Carolin raised the variety to species status as G. brachypoda. The specific epithet (brachypoda) means "short-footed", referring to the short peduncles.

== Distribution ==
This goodenia grows in the Northern Kimberley, Victoria Bonaparte and Ord Victoria Plain biogeographic regions of northern Western Australia and the north-west of the Northern Territory.

== Conservation status ==
Goodenia brachypoda is classified as "Priority One" by the Government of Western Australia Department of Parks and Wildlife, meaning that it is known from only one or a few locations which are potentially at risk, but as of "least concern" under the Northern Territory Government Territory Parks and Wildlife Conservation Act 1976.
