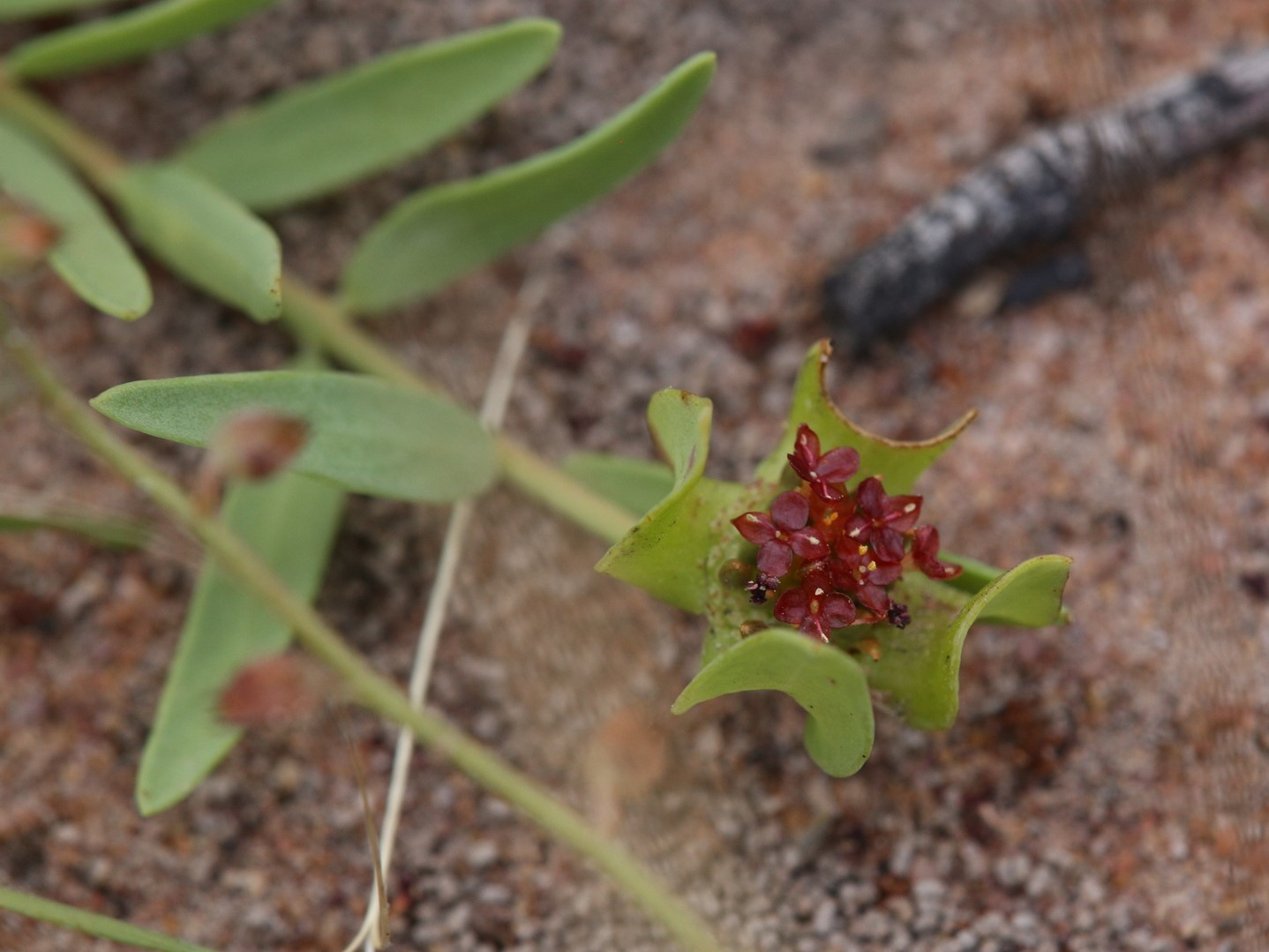

Scientific classification
- Kingdom: Plantae
- Clade: Tracheophytes
- Clade: Angiosperms
- Clade: Eudicots
- Clade: Rosids
- Order: Malvales
- Family: Thymelaeaceae
- Genus: Pimelea
- Species: P. sanguinea

Binomial name
- Pimelea sanguinea F.Muell.

= Pimelea sanguinea =

Species of shrub

Pimelea sanguinea is a species of flowering plant in the family Thymelaeaceae and is endemic to northern Australia. It is a semi-prostrate herb with narrowly egg-shaped to almost linear leaves, and heads of red flowers surrounded by green or reddish, and deep reddish-purple involucral bracts.

== Description ==
Pimelea sanguinea is a semi-prostrate herb that typically grows to a height of up to 30 cm (12 in). Its leaves are narrowly egg-shaped to almost linear, 5–38 mm (0.20–1.50 in) long and 1–7 mm (0.039–0.276 in) wide. The flowers are red and arranged in clusters surrounded by egg-shaped involucral bracts 7–26 mm (0.28–1.02 in) long and 2.5–11 mm (0.098–0.433 in) wide. The bracts are green or reddish on the outside, green or deep reddish-purple inside. The floral tube is 3–6 mm (0.12–0.24 in) long and the sepals 1.0–2.5 mm (0.039–0.098 in) long. Flowering occurs from February to August.

== Taxonomy and naming ==
Pimelea sanguinea was first formally described in 1859 by Ferdinand von Mueller in his Fragmenta Phytographiae Australiae from specimens collected near the mouth of the Roper River. The specific epithet (sanguinea) means "blood red".

== Distribution and habitat ==
This pimelea grows in sand and clay, often or woodland, sometimes near wetlands and is found from the Mitchell Plateau, through the Central Kimberley, Northern Kimberley and Victoria Bonaparte bioregions of northern Western Australia and the north of the Northern Territory, to near Dimbulah in northern Queensland.
