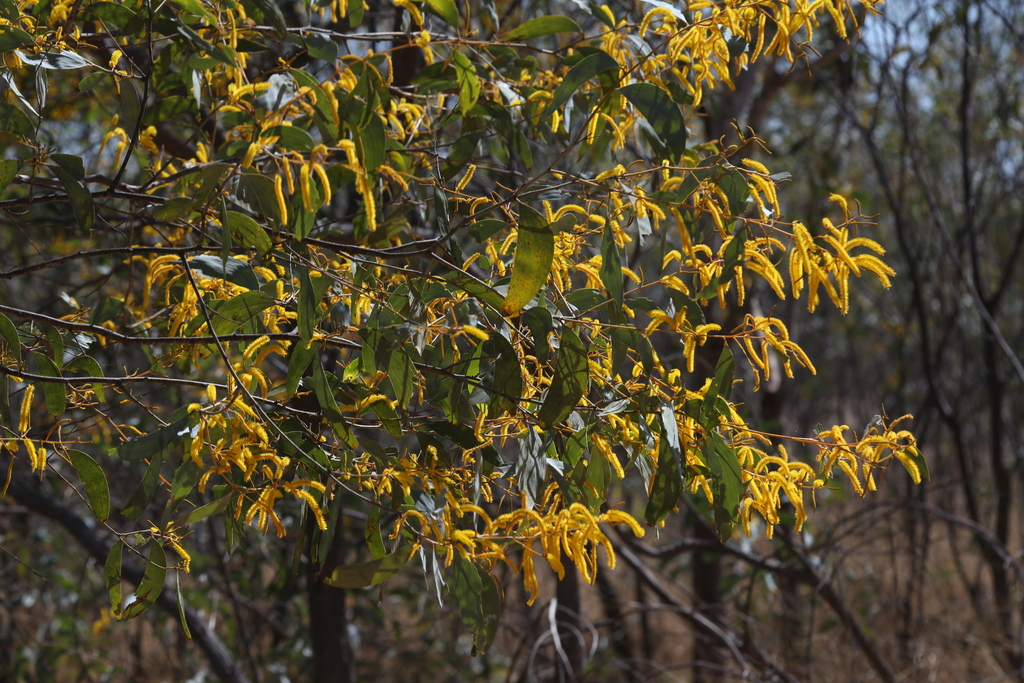
- var. tumida near Camballin

Scientific classification
- Kingdom: Plantae
- Clade: Embryophytes
- Clade: Tracheophytes
- Clade: Spermatophytes
- Clade: Angiosperms
- Clade: Eudicots
- Clade: Rosids
- Order: Fabales
- Family: Fabaceae
- Subfamily: Caesalpinioideae
- Clade: Mimosoid clade
- Genus: Acacia
- Species: A. tumida

Binomial name
- Acacia tumida F.Muell. ex Benth.
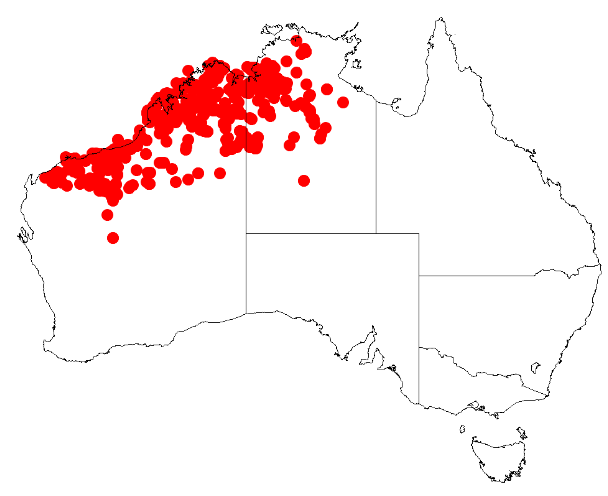
- Occurrence data from AVH

Synonyms
- Racosperma tumidum (F.Muell. ex Benth.) Pedley

= Acacia tumida =

Species of legume

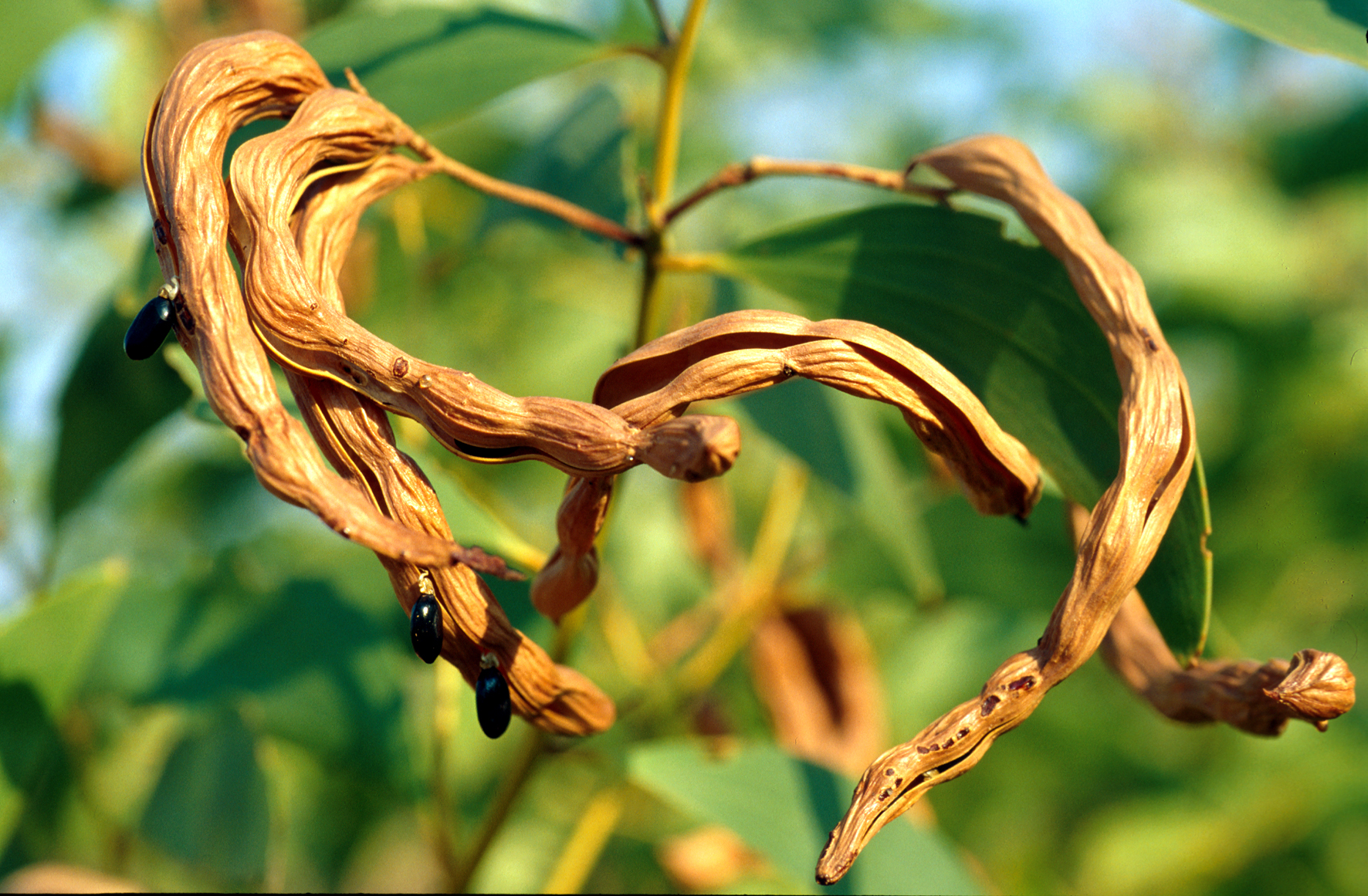
Seed pods

Acacia tumida, known colloquially as pindan wattle, spear wattle or wongai, is a species of Acacia native to northern and western Australia.

== Description ==
The openly branched spreading tree or shrub typically grows to a height of 5 to 15 metres (16 to 49 ft) with a well developed canopy. It has hard grey glossy bark that is occasionally fissured with pruinose orange to yellow branchlets. It has falcate to subfalcate glaucous green phyllodes that are 6 to 25 centimetres (2 to 10 in) long and 0.7 to 6 cm (0.3 to 2.4 in) wide.

It produces between April and October and produces yellow inflorescences, usually racemose or axillary or terminal panicles 20 cm (7.9 in) long. These eventually develop into narrow oblong woody glabrous seed pods that are 3 to 12 cm (1.2 to 4.7 in) in length containing glossy black seeds.

A. tumida grows quickly but has a short lifespan, usually less than 10 years.

== Range ==
A. tumida has a range that extends from the Kimberley, Pilbara and north eastern Goldfields regions of Western Australia including much of the Great Sandy Desert. It also extends into the Victoria River district of the Northern Territory. It grows well in sandplain areas in red sandy or pindan soils over sandstone. They often form dense thickets with spinifex.

It is also cultivated in Yemen, Vietnam, Senegal and Niger.

== Varieties ==
There are four recognised varieties of Acacia tumida:

- Acacia tumida var. extensis
- Acacia tumida var. kulparn
- Acacia tumida var. pilbarensis
- Acacia tumida var. tumida

== Uses ==
Indigenous Australians used the trunk of young trees to fashion spears and boomerangs. The green seed pods were cooked over coals and the seeds then eaten. Fully ripened black seeds were ground into flour mixed with water and consumed as a paste or cooked and eaten as a damper. Other traditional uses include making string from the bark and using the gum exudate as a food source.

It is cultivated in Senegal and Niger, where it is used as good quality firewood and to create low windbreaks. It is also used with slower growing plants for binding soil.

== See also ==
- List of Acacia species
