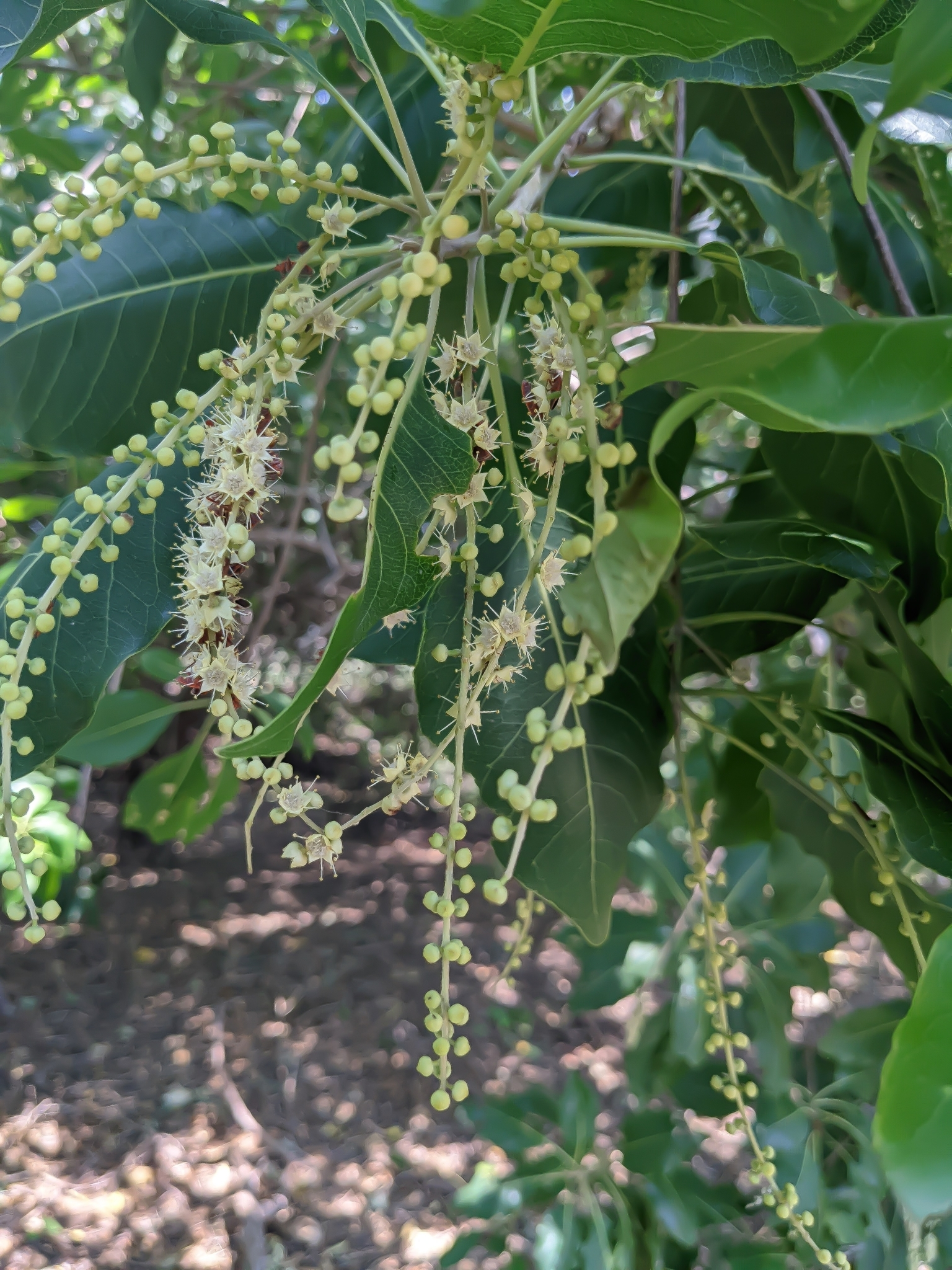

Scientific classification
- Kingdom: Plantae
- Clade: Tracheophytes
- Clade: Angiosperms
- Clade: Eudicots
- Clade: Rosids
- Order: Myrtales
- Family: Combretaceae
- Genus: Terminalia
- Species: T. petiolaris

Binomial name
- Terminalia petiolaris Benth., 1864

Synonyms
- Myrobalanus petiolaris

= Terminalia petiolaris =

Species of tree

Terminalia petiolaris, commonly known as blackberry tree or billygoat plum, or marool in the local Bardi language, is a species of plant in the family Combretaceae. It is endemic to the coast of the Kimberley region of northern Western Australia.

== Description ==
It grows as a small, deciduous tree up to 15 m in height with rough, grey bark. It produces strongly scented, cream-white flowers from February to May, and November to December. It has edible fruits, purple when ripe.

== Distribution and habitat ==
It occurs on sandy soils, often in vine thickets. It is found in the Dampierland and Northern Kimberley IBRA bioregions.
