= Dampierland =

Bioregion in Western Australia

- Region
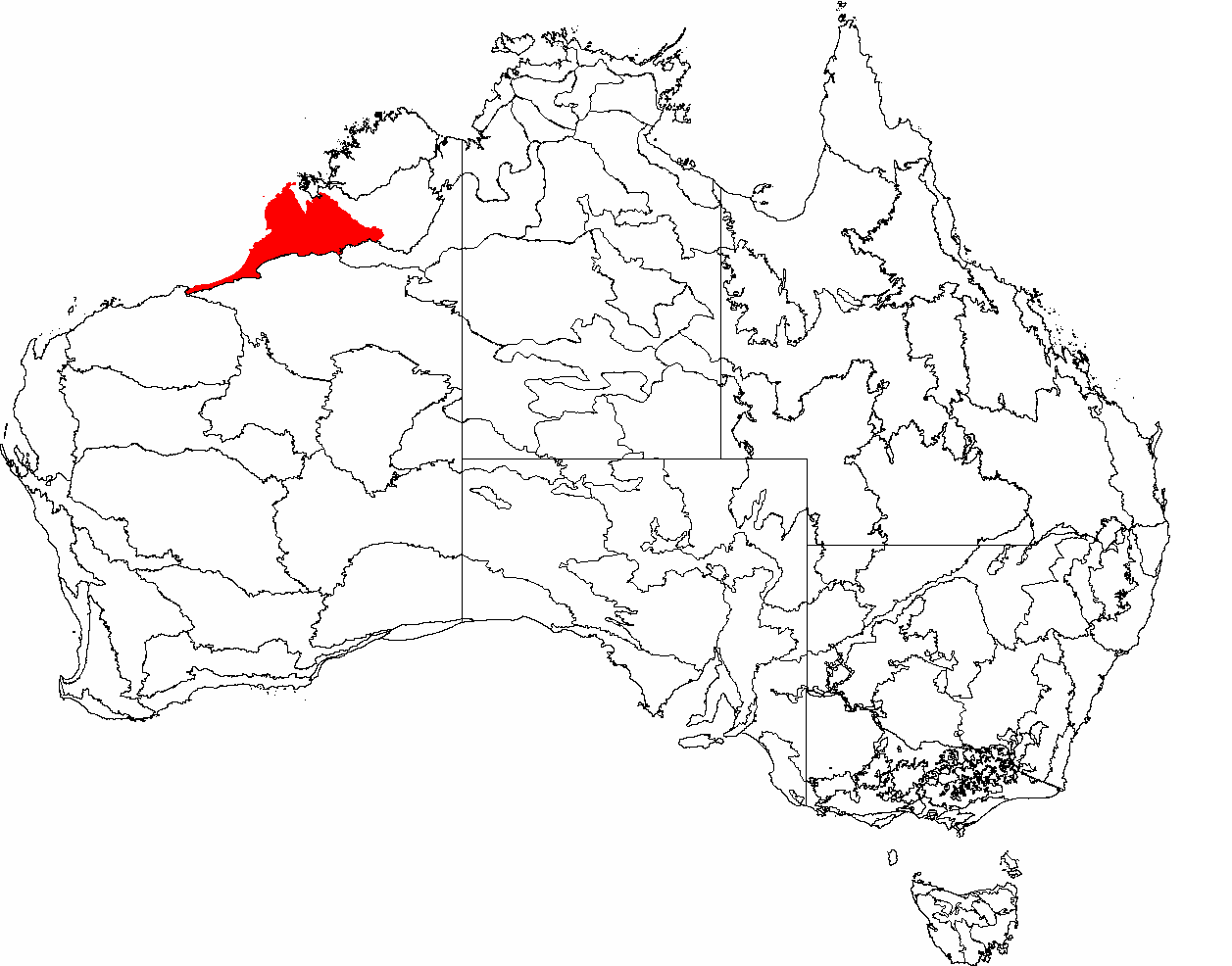
- The interim Australian bioregions, with Dampierland in red
- Country: Australia
- State: Western Australia

Area
  - Total: 83,608.71 km^{2} (32,281.50 sq mi)
Localities around Dampierland
Indian Ocean	Northern Kimberley	Central Kimberley
Indian Ocean	Dampierland	Central Kimberley
Pilbara	Great Sandy Desert	Ord Victoria Plain

Dampierland is an interim Australian bioregion in Western Australia. The region is also a distinct physiographic section of the larger Nullagine Platform province, which in turn is part of the larger West Australian Shield division.

The bioregion is located in the West Kimberley area and incorporates the country that is adjacent to Broome, including the Dampier Peninsula and coastal region behind Eighty Mile Beach. Its characteristic vegetation is pindan woodland.
