= Great Sandy Desert =

Desert in Northern Western Australia

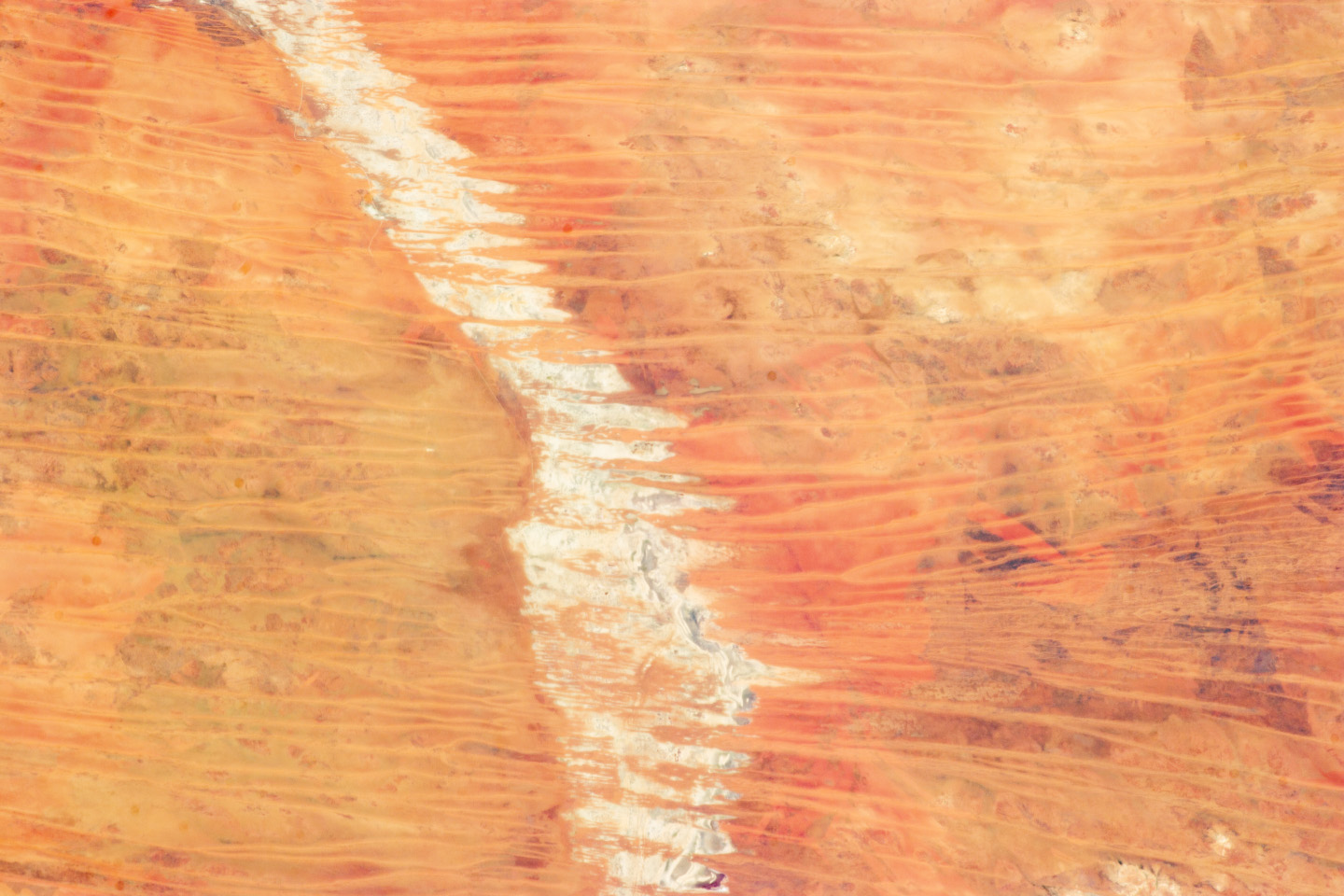
- A satellite image of the dunes in the Great Sandy Desert

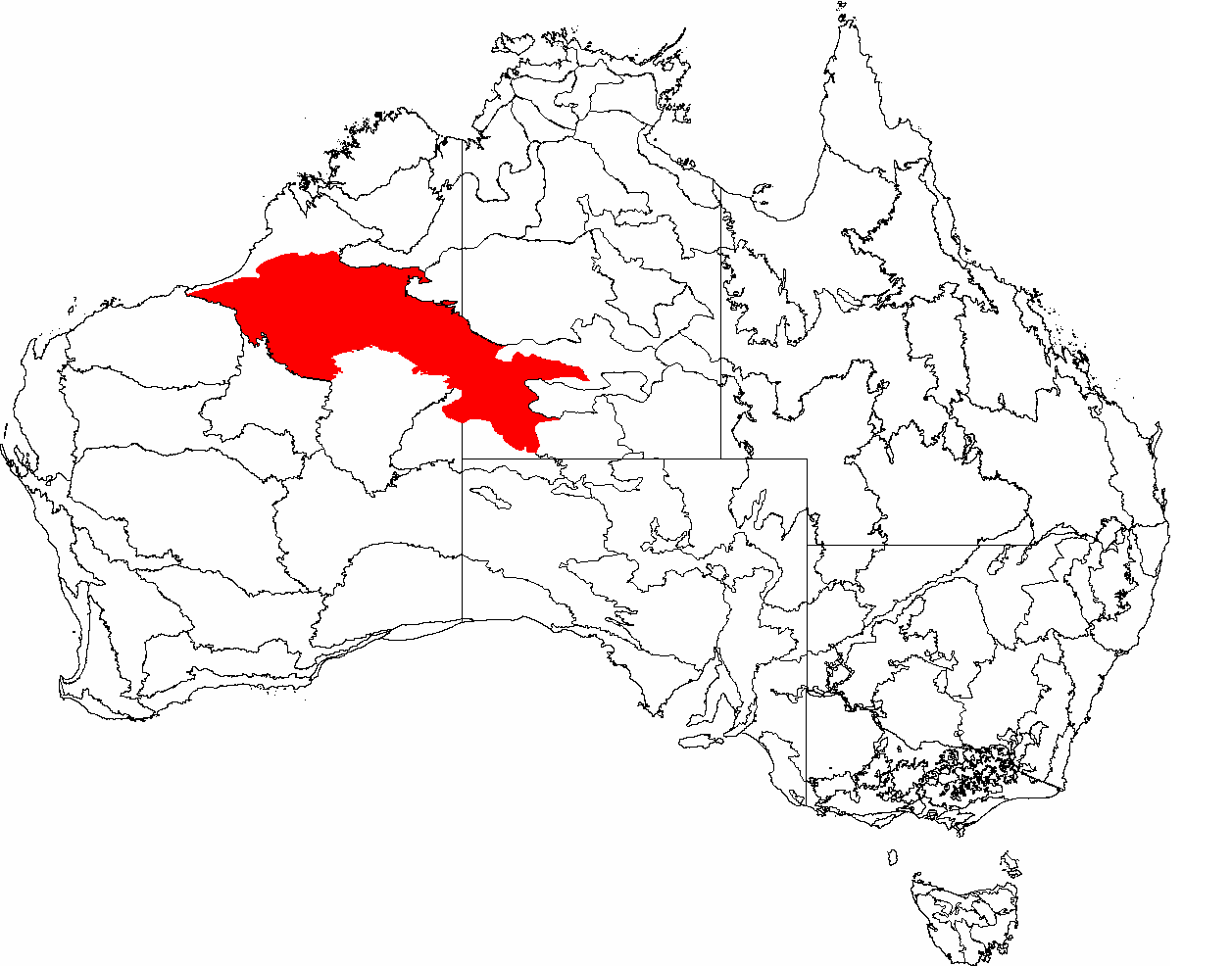
- The IBRA bioregions, with the Great Sandy Desert in red
- Area: 284,993 km^{2} (110,036 mi^{2})

Geography
- Country: Australia
- State/Territory: Western Australia; Northern Territory
- Coordinates: 20°S 125°E

The Great Sandy Desert is an interim Australian bioregion, located in the northeast of Western Australia straddling the Pilbara and southern Kimberley regions and extending east into the Northern Territory. It is the second largest desert in Australia after the Great Victoria Desert and encompasses an area of 284,993 km^{2} (110,036 sq mi). The Gibson Desert lies to the south and the Tanami Desert lies to the east of the Great Sandy Desert.

== Features ==
The Great Sandy Desert contains large ergs, often consisting of longitudinal dunes.

In the north-east of the desert there is a meteorite impact crater, the Wolfe Creek crater.

"Fairy circles", which are circular patches of land barren of plants, varying between 2 and 12 m (7 and 39 ft) in diameter and often encircled by a ring of stimulated growth of grass, are found in the western part of the desert, in the Pilbara region. It has not yet been proven what causes these formations, but one theory suggests that they have been built and inhabited by Australian harvester termites since the Pleistocene.

== Population ==
The region is sparsely populated. The main populations consist of Aboriginal Australian communities and mining centres. The Aboriginal people of the desert fall into two main groups, the Martu in the west and the Pintupi in the east. Linguistically, they are speakers of multiple Western Desert languages. Many of these Indigenous people were forcibly removed from their lands during the late 18th, 19th, and the early 20th centuries, to be relocated to other settlements, such as Papunya in the Northern Territory. In the late 20th and early 21st centuries, some of the original inhabitants returned. Young adults, from the Great Sandy Desert region, travel to and work in the Wilurarra Creative programs to maintain and develop their culture, and a greater sense of community.

== Climate ==
Rainfall is low throughout the coast and, especially further north, is strongly seasonal. Areas near the Kimberley have an average rainfall that exceeds 300 mm (12 in), but can be patchy. Many dry years end with a monsoon cloud mass or a tropical cyclone. Like many of Australia's deserts, precipitation is high by desert standards, but with the driest regions recording total rainfall a little below 250 mm (9.8 in). The heat of Australia’s ground surface, in turn, creates a massive evaporation cycle, which partially explains the higher-than-normal desert rainfall. This region is one which gives rise to the heat lows, which help drive the NW monsoon. Almost all the rain regionally comes from monsoon thunderstorms, or the occasional tropical cyclone rain depression.

Annually, for most of the area, there are about 20–30 days where thunderstorms form. However, in the north and bordering the Kimberley, 30-40 per year is the average.

Summer daytime temperatures are some of the highest in Australia. Regions further south average 38 to 42 °C (100 to 108 °F), except when monsoonal cloud cover is active. Several people have died in this region during seasonal flooding, after their vehicles were stuck or broken down on remote dirt roads. Conversely, a few travellers have had their vehicles malfunction during the hottest times of the year, with dehydration, sun exposure and heatstroke being the predominant causes of death. Winters are short and warm; temperatures range from 25 to 30 °C (77 to 86 °F).

Frost does not occur in most of the area. The regions bordering the Gibson Desert in the far southeast may record a light frost or two every year. Away from the coast winter nights can still be chilly in comparison to the warm days.

Climate data for Telfer, Western Australia (temperatures, extremes and rain data 1974 - 2013)
Month	Jan	Feb	Mar	Apr	May	Jun	Jul	Aug	Sep	Oct	Nov	Dec	Year
Record high °C (°F)	48.1 (118.6)	47.1 (116.8)	45.1 (113.2)	41.2 (106.2)	38.0 (100.4)	33.9 (93.0)	33.4 (92.1)	36.0 (96.8)	41.3 (106.3)	44.1 (111.4)	46.0 (114.8)	47.5 (117.5)	48.1 (118.6)
Mean daily maximum °C (°F)	40.6 (105.1)	38.6 (101.5)	37.3 (99.1)	34.5 (94.1)	29.1 (84.4)	25.3 (77.5)	25.3 (77.5)	28.4 (83.1)	32.7 (90.9)	37.0 (98.6)	39.4 (102.9)	40.2 (104.4)	34.0 (93.2)
Mean daily minimum °C (°F)	26.0 (78.8)	25.4 (77.7)	23.9 (75.0)	20.6 (69.1)	15.3 (59.5)	11.9 (53.4)	10.6 (51.1)	12.5 (54.5)	16.5 (61.7)	20.8 (69.4)	23.4 (74.1)	25.4 (77.7)	19.4 (66.9)
Record low °C (°F)	17.2 (63.0)	17.7 (63.9)	14.4 (57.9)	11.5 (52.7)	5.6 (42.1)	2.1 (35.8)	3.0 (37.4)	2.5 (36.5)	6.2 (43.2)	10.5 (50.9)	13.0 (55.4)	16.5 (61.7)	2.1 (35.8)
Average rainfall mm (inches)	49.1 (1.93)	102.7 (4.04)	77.3 (3.04)	20.0 (0.79)	18.5 (0.73)	12.1 (0.48)	13.2 (0.52)	5.4 (0.21)	2.5 (0.10)	2.9 (0.11)	16.5 (0.65)	46.9 (1.85)	370.4 (14.58)
Average precipitation days	7.5	8.7	5.9	2.8	2.7	2.8	1.5	1.1	0.8	1.1	2.4	5.3	42.6
Source: Bureau of Meteorology

== Economy ==
Indigenous art is a huge industry in central Australia. Mines, most importantly the Telfer gold mine and Nifty copper mine, and cattle stations are found in the far west. Telfer is one of the largest gold mines in Australia. The undeveloped Kintyre uranium deposit lies south of Telfer.

== Fauna and flora ==
The vegetation of the Great Sandy Desert is dominated by spinifex.

Animals in the region include feral camels and dingoes. Other mammalian inhabitants include bilbies, mulgara, marsupial moles, rufous hare-wallabies, and red kangaroos.

Varied types of lizards occur here, such as goannas (including the large perentie), thorny devils, and bearded dragons.

Some of the bird-life found within the desert include the rare Alexandra's parrot, the mulga parrot and the scarlet-chested parrot.

== See also ==
- Carnegie expedition of 1896
- Deserts of Australia
- Gary Junction Road
- List of deserts by area
- Telfer, Western Australia
