= Northern Kimberley =

Bioregion in Western Australia

Northern Kimberley Western Australia
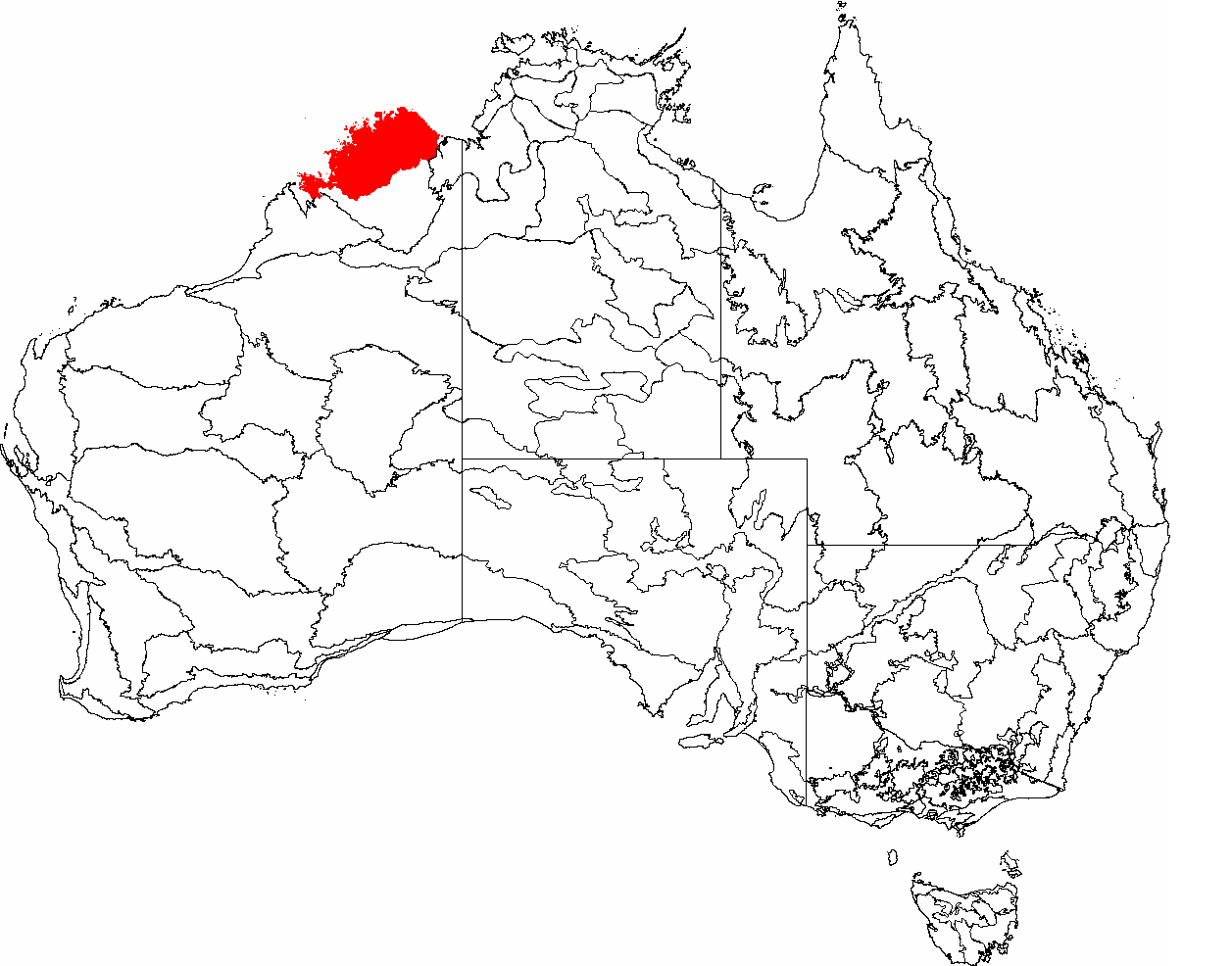
- The interim Australian bioregions, with the Northern Kimberley in red
- Area: 84,201 km^{2} (32,510.2 sq mi)
Localities around Northern Kimberley:
Timor Sea	Timor Sea	Timor Sea
Timor Sea	North Kimberley	Victoria Bonaparte
Dampierland	Central Kimberley	Ord Victoria Plain

The Northern Kimberley, an interim Australian bioregion, is located in the northern Kimberley region of Western Australia, comprising 8,420,100 hectares (20,807,000 acres).

It is composed of two recognised sub-regions: Mitchell and Berkeley subregions.

== See also ==
- Geography of Australia
