= Ord Victoria Plain =

Bioregion in Australia

Ord Victoria Plain Australia
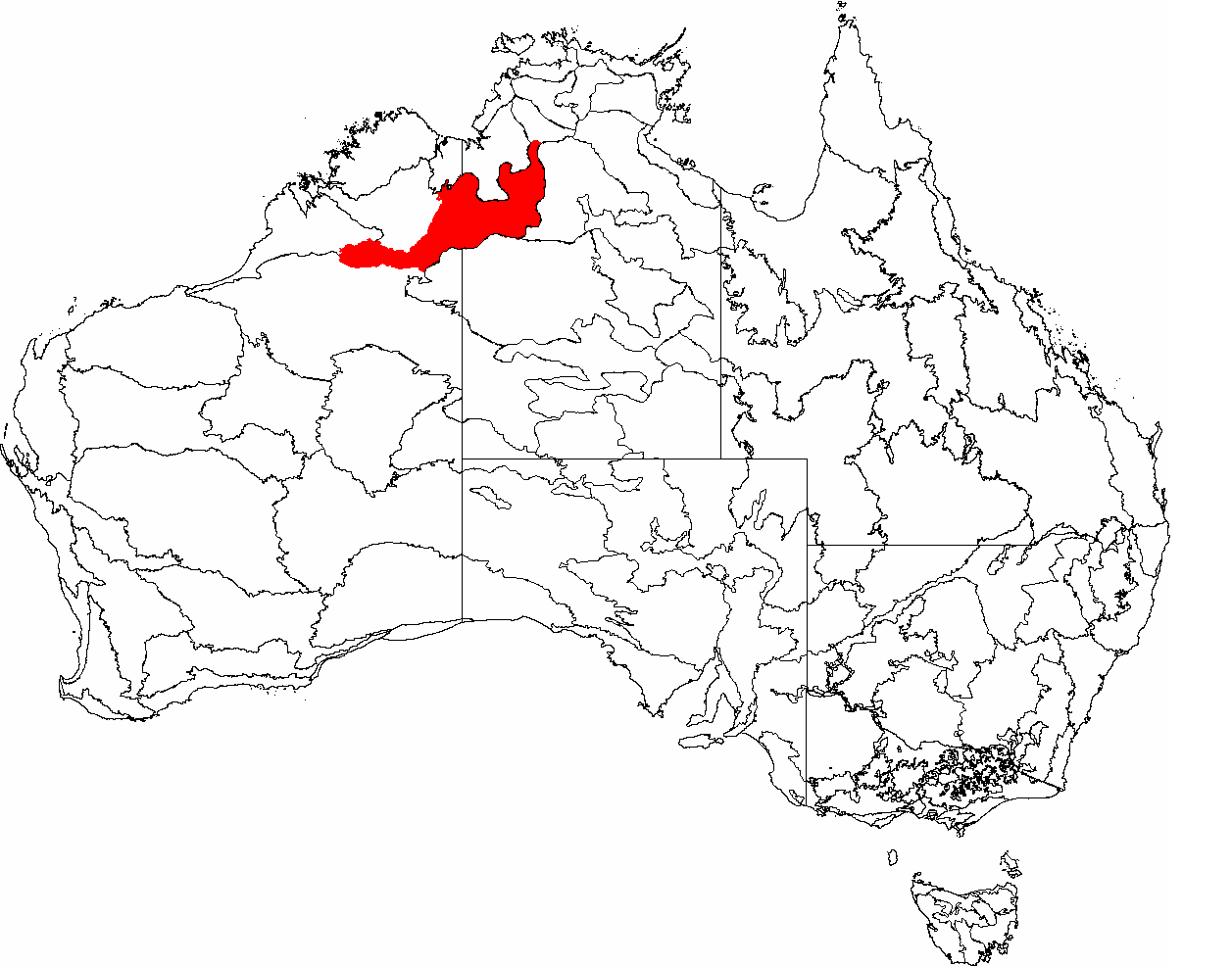
- The interim Australian bioregions, with the Ord Victoria Plain in red
- Area: 125,407.03 km^{2} (48,419.9 sq mi)
Localities around Ord Victoria Plain:
Northern Kimberley	Victoria Bonaparte	Daly Basin
Central Kimberley	Ord Victoria Plain	Sturt Plateau
Great Sandy Desert	Tanami	Tanami

The Ord Victoria Plain, an interim Australian bioregion, is located in the Northern Territory and Western Australia, comprising 12,540,703 hectares (30,988,750 acres).

The bioregion draws its name from the Ord River and the Victoria River.

== Location and description ==
This is an area of large plains of dry grassland lying between the Tanami Desert to the south and the wetter, greener grassland to the north towards the coast. Sandstone outcrops rise from the grassland, the most famous of which is the Bungle Bungle Range in Purnululu National Park. The grasslands have long been used for cattle grazing. The climate is wetter in the north (ave annual rainfall 1200mm), which receives some coastal monsoonal rain, and drier in the south (ave 600mm). The rainy season is between November and March and the whole area is almost completely dry for the rest of the year and the climate is hot with maximum temperatures between 25 °C and 35 °C year round.

== Flora ==
The plain is largely covered with Mitchell grass scattered with bloodwood Eucalyptus / Corymbia trees, native bauhinia (Bauhinia cunninghamii) and large patches of lancewood acacia (Acacia shirleyi) woodland. The sandstone outcrops have thinner cover of eucalyptus over hummock grass or heathland scattered with Grevillea and Acacia trees. Riverine ecosystems around permanent water courses consist of paperbark (Melaleuca), river redgum (Eucalyptus) and river pandanus (Pandanus).

== Fauna ==
There are few endemic species as these grasslands are typical of much of northern Australia at this latitude but the grasslands are nonetheless largely intact and rich in wildlife. Mammals include the large common wallaroo, northern nail-tail wallaby (Onychogalea unguifera), and the long-tailed planigale which is the smallest marsupial in the world. The lancewoods are home to the spectacled hare-wallaby (Lagorchestes conspicillatus), while the Bungle Bungle has some unique plants and an endemic Lerista skink lizard the Lerista bunglebungle. Mammals that have become depleted or disappeared from these grasslands include the bilby (Macrotis lagotis), northern quoll (Dasyurus hallucatus) and golden bandicoot (Isoodon auratus).

Birds include Australian bustards, singing bushlark, and red-backed fairy-wren while there are important populations of purple-crowned fairywren (Malurus coronatus) along the rivers especially the Victoria. The eucalyptus trees are habitat for lorikeets, friarbirds, and honeyeaters. Termites are a source of food for many of these birds and animals. The wildlife of the grasslands is still being researched so for example a new species of Ctenotus skink has been discovered quite recently.

== Threats and preservation ==
In general this is a large area of relatively unspoilt grassland used for grazing cattle. Some damage results from intensive cattle ranching leading to overgrazing and disrupting the traditional Aboriginal fire regimes in which the grasslands are systematically burnt and allowed to regenerate. Woodlands next to rivers and other water sources were severely altered when ranching began, causing siltation along the Ord River and destroying important habitat of the white-browed robin (Poecilodryas superciliosa) and the purple-crowned fairywren. Habitats have also been damaged by introduced species of plants such as bellyache bush (Jatropha gossypifolia), and castor oil plant (Ricinus communis). There are some protected areas, mainly other types of habitat rather than grazing land. Areas such as the caves of Gregory National Park are still being researched by botanists and zoologists.

== See also ==
- Geography of Australia
