= Central Kimberley =

Bioregion in Western Australia

Central Kimberley Western Australia
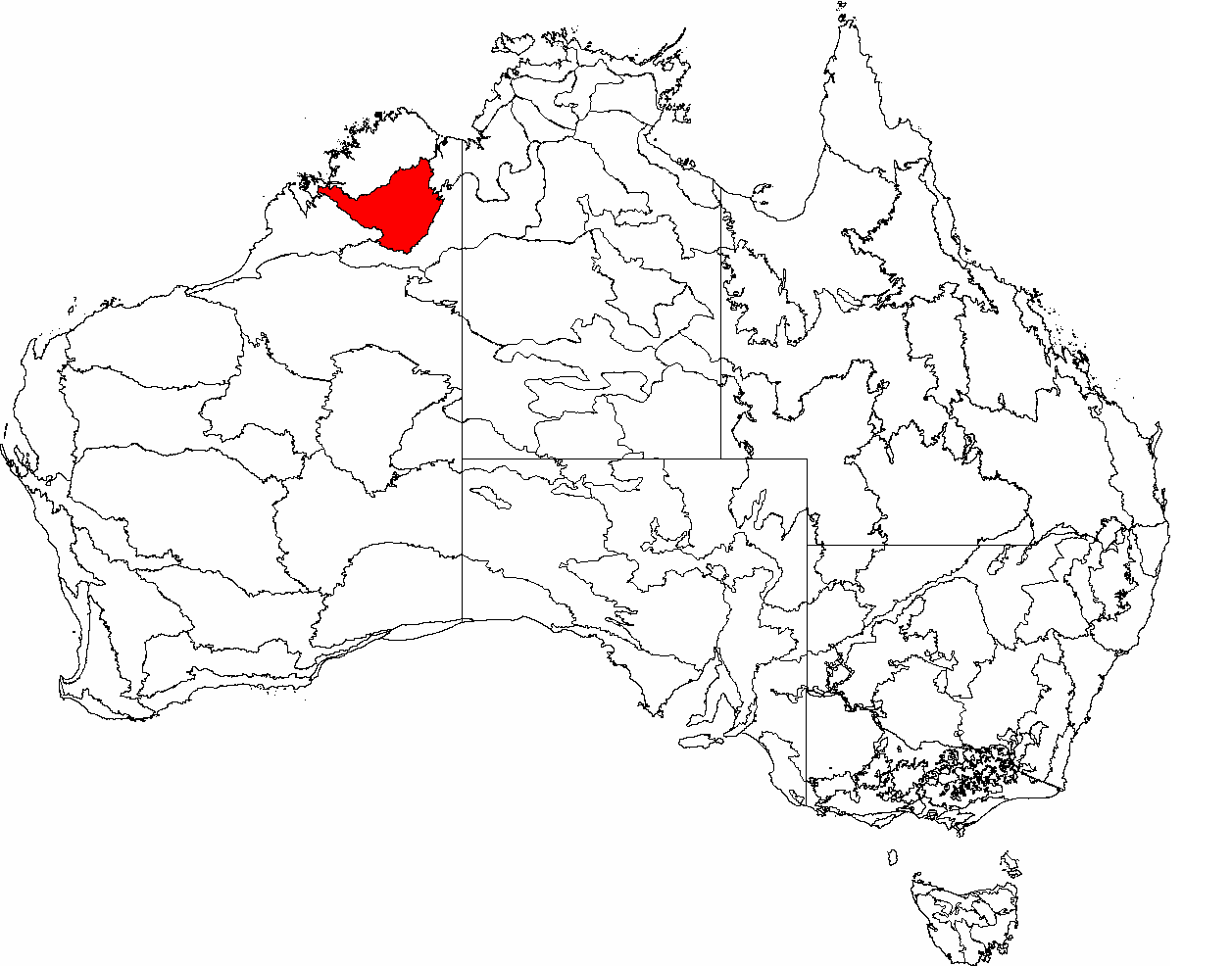
- The interim Australian bioregions, with the Central Kimberley in red
- Area: 76,755.87 km^{2} (29,635.6 sq mi)
Localities around Central Kimberley:
Timor Sea	Northern Kimberley	Victoria Bonaparte
Dampierland	Central Kimberley	Ord Victoria Plain
Great Sandy Desert	Great Sandy Desert	Ord Victoria Plain

The Central Kimberley, an interim Australian bioregion, is located in the central Kimberley region of Western Australia, comprising an area of 7,675,587 hectares (18,966,790 acres).

== See also ==
- Geography of Western Australia
