= Scribbly gum =

Scribbly gum is a name given to a variety of different Australian Eucalyptus trees which play host to the larvae of scribbly gum moths which leave distinctive scribbly burrowing patterns on the bark.

Trees often referred to as scribbly gums include:

- Eucalyptus haemastoma, the best known type occurring near Sydney
- Eucalyptus sclerophylla, similar to Eucalyptus haemastoma, with smaller gumnuts
- Eucalyptus racemosa, often a larger and a broader trunked scribbly gum
- Eucalyptus signata, occurring in the north coast of New South Wales and in Queensland
- Eucalyptus rossii, occurring west of the Great Dividing Range in New South Wales

Many other Eucalyptus trees have scribbles and are not known as "scribbly gums", such as Eucalyptus pilularis (blackbutt), Eucalyptus saligna (Sydney blue gum), Eucalyptus stenostoma (Jilliga ash), Eucalyptus pauciflora (snow gum) and Eucalyptus fraxinoides (white ash).
