= White gum =

White gum is a common name of a great many Eucalyptus species, all of which have smooth white bark.

Species that have "White gum" as a common name include:

- Corymbia aparrerinja (also known as ghost gum, desert white gum and Dallachy's Gum)
- Eucalyptus alba (also known as Timor white gum)
- Eucalyptus argophloia (also known as Chinchilla white gum, Queensland western white gum, Queensland white gum, and western white gum)
- Eucalyptus benthamii (Camden white gum, Dorrigo white gum)
- Eucalyptus bigalerita (Adelaide River white gum)
- Eucalyptus brevifolia (northern white gum, snappy white gum)
- Eucalyptus cupularis (Halls Creek white gum)
- Eucalyptus dalrympleana (also known as mountain white gum)
- Eucalyptus delegatensis (mountain white gum)
- Eucalyptus dorrigoensis (Dorrigo white gum)
- Eucalyptus dunnii (also known as Dunns white gum)
- Eucalyptus elata (river white gum)
- Eucalyptus haemastoma
- Eucalyptus houseana (Kimberley white gum, tropical white gum)
- Eucalyptus leucophloia (snappy white gum)
- Eucalyptus mooreana (mountain white gum)
- Eucalyptus ovata
- Eucalyptus papuana (also known as drooping white gum, Molloy white gum)
- Eucalyptus platyphylla
- Eucalyptus racemosa
- Eucalyptus rossii
- Eucalyptus rubida
- Eucalyptus scoparia (Wallangarra white gum)
- Eucalyptus signata (also known as peppermint-leaved white gum)
- Eucalyptus viminalis
- Eucalyptus wandoo (also known as wandoo)
