= Ogmograptis scribula =

Scientific classification
- Kingdom: Animalia
- Phylum: Arthropoda
- Class: Insecta
- Order: Lepidoptera
- Family: Bucculatricidae
- Genus: Ogmograptis; Meyrick, 1935
- Species: O. scribula

Binomial name
- Ogmograptis scribula Meyrick, 1935

Species of moth

Ogmograptis scribula (literally the writer of the Ogam script), the scribbly gum moth, is a moth of the family Bucculatricidae. It is found in the Australian Capital Territory, New South Wales and Queensland. It is responsible for producing 'scribbles' found of multiple species of Eucalypts, creating the pattern from which its name is derived.

== Life cycle ==
The adult moth lays eggs on a depression in the bark of target eucalypt species in autumn/early winter. The larvae then burrow into the bark to the depth of the next years phellogen creating long arcs, which tighten to squiggles as they develop into larger instar stages. The second-last instar will backtrack along the original mine, doubling its width or creating a parallel track depending on species. The final instar, a caterpillar with legs, will then follow the path one last time, feeding on the nutritious scar tissue that they tree lays down in the previously damaged areas.

The caterpillar then emerges and forms a cocoon at the base of the tree, and emerges as a moth ~1 month later.

== Distribution ==
The scribbly gum moth is found on the east coast of Australia, from Tasmania to Southern Queensland.

== Patterns ==
The patterns created by the scribbly gum moth are only visible after the caterpillar exists the tree and the top layer of bark sheds, which historically made it difficult to identify the species which caused the marks.

The ubiquity of the scribbles in the Australian bush, and the mystery of their origin inspired books and poetry, including the writing in Snugglepot and Cuddlepie books by May Gibbs and poetry by Judith Wright.

In 2007, Cooke and Edwards argued that O. scribula was the scribbler on Eucalyptus pauciflora, but that the scribbles on other ACT species of scribbly gum (Eucalyptus racemosa ssp. rossii, and E. delegatensis) came from a different species of Ogmograptis, since the patterning of the scribbles was consistently different across the three eucalypt species.

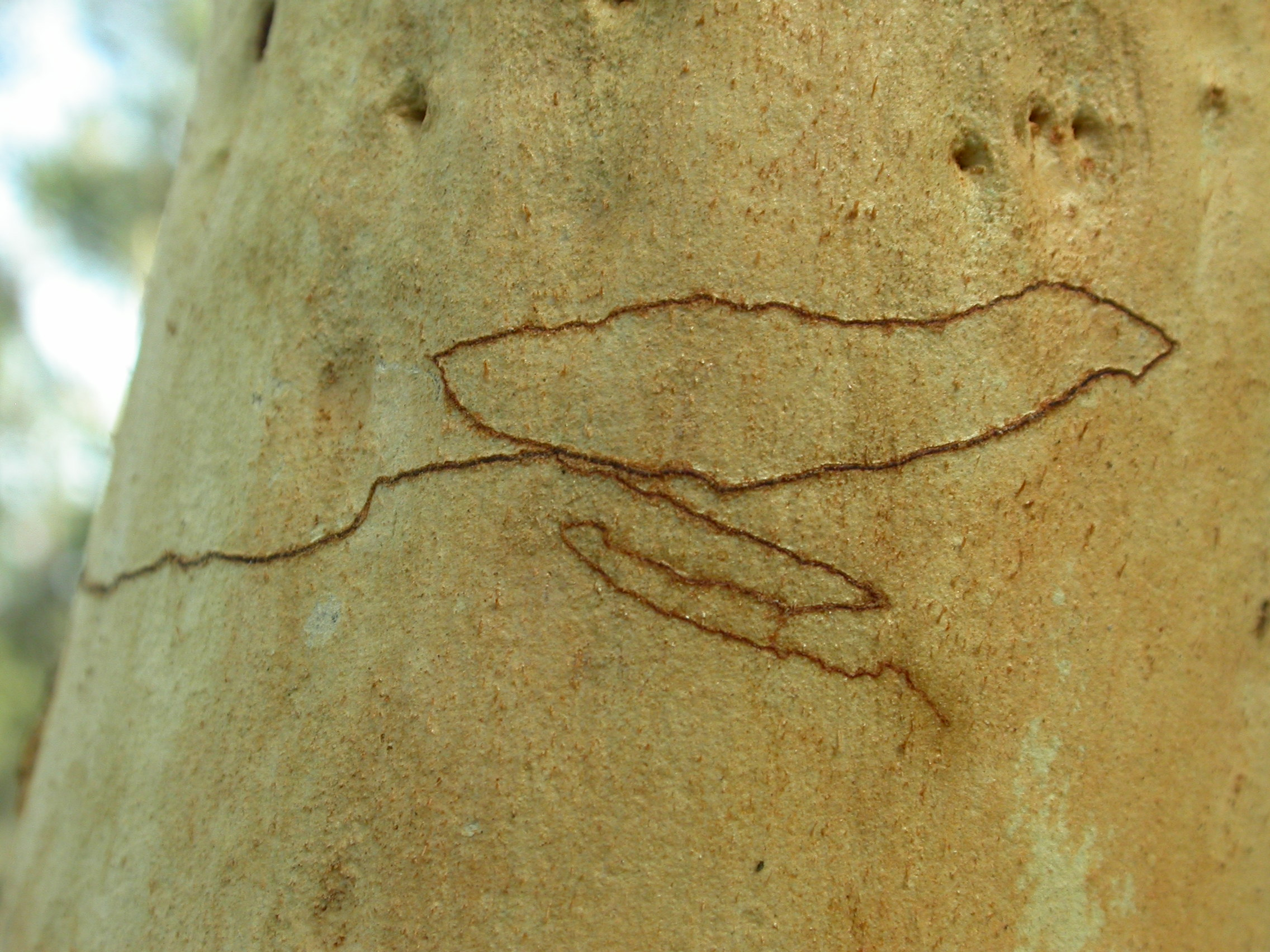
Mine in bark of Eucalyptus rossii

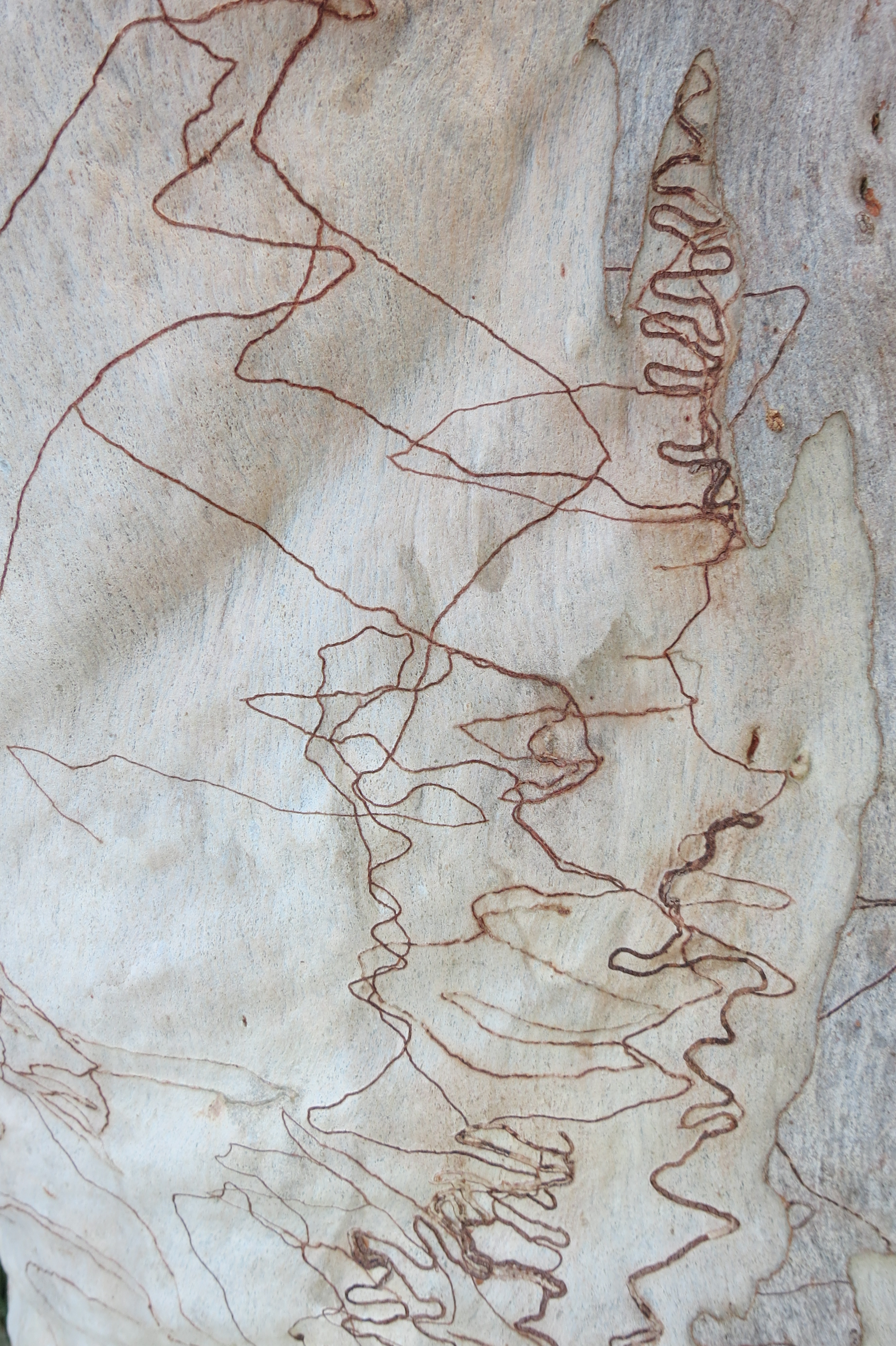
Scribbles on E. haemastoma
