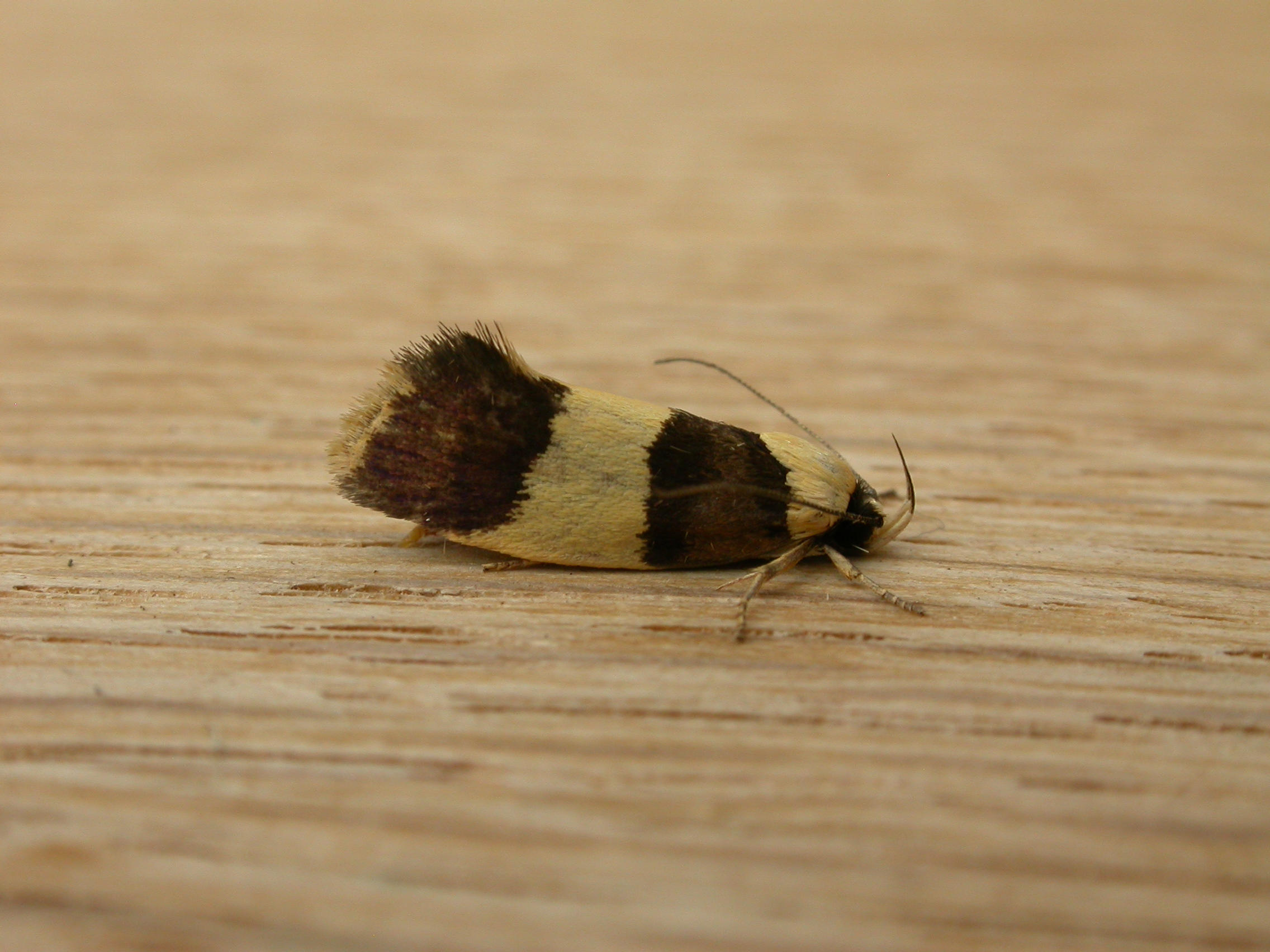

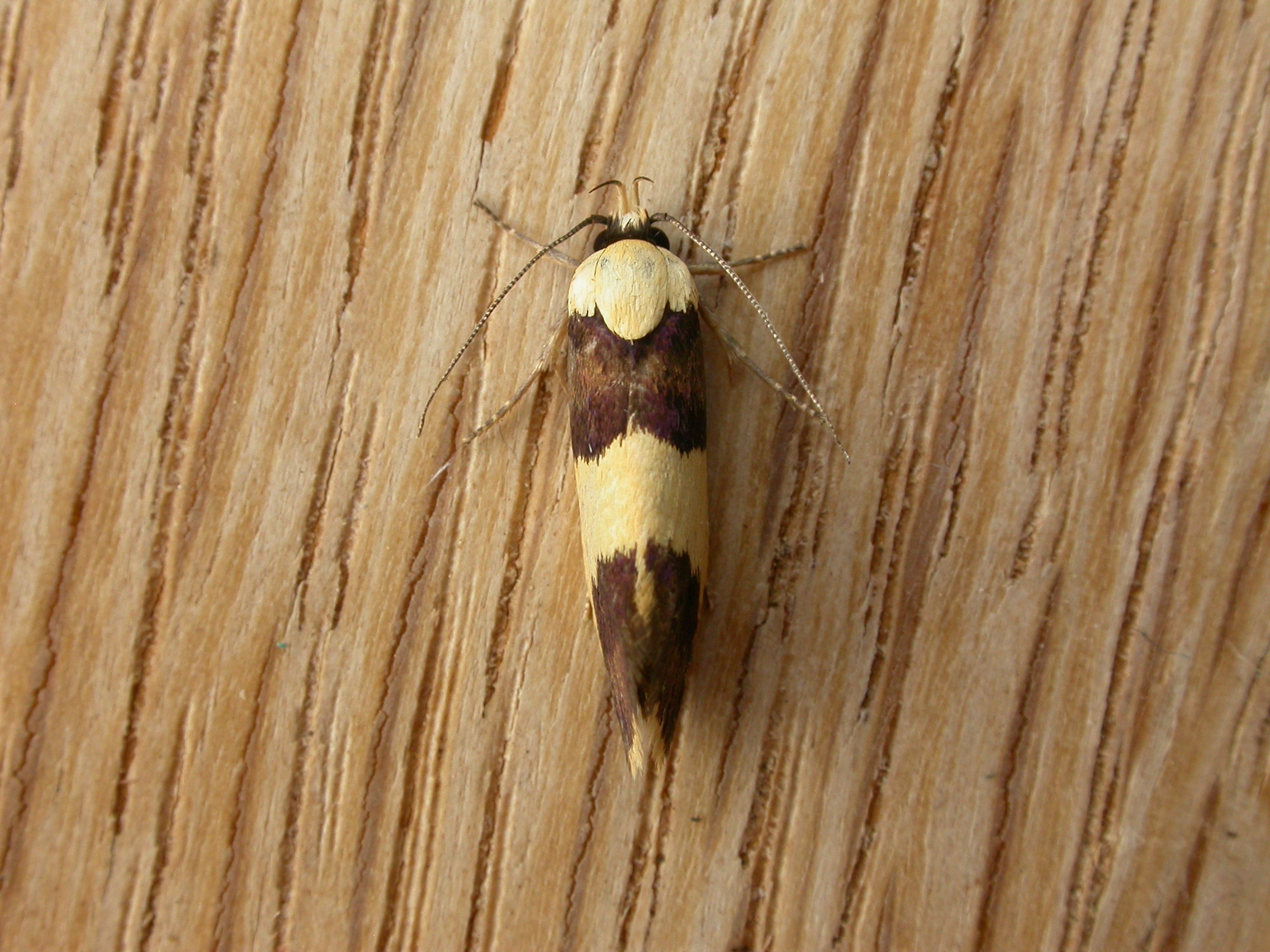

Scientific classification
- Kingdom: Animalia
- Phylum: Arthropoda
- Class: Insecta
- Order: Lepidoptera
- Family: Xyloryctidae
- Genus: Telecrates
- Species: T. laetiorella

Binomial name
- Telecrates laetiorella (Walker, 1864)

Synonyms
- Oecophora laetiorella Walker, 1864; Xylorycta laetiorella

= Telecrates laetiorella =

Species of moth

Telecrates laetiorella is a moth of the family Xyloryctidae. It is known from the Australian Capital Territory, New South Wales, Queensland, South Australia and Victoria.

== Description ==
The wingspan is 16–23 mm. Head black, face pale yellow. Palpi whitish-yellowish, base of second joint and terminal joint except base dark fuscous. Antennae yellow-whitish, towards base dark fuscous. Thorax ochreous-yellow. Abdomen light ochreous yellowish, sprinkled with grey. Legs light ochreous-yellowish, anterior and middle pair suffusedly banded with grey. Forewings elongate-oblong, costa moderately arched, apex obtuse, hindmargin faintly sinuate, oblique; ochreous-yellow; two very broad deep purple fasciae, obscurely margined with dark fuscous; first almost basal, outer edge slightly convex; second hindmarginal, anterior edge rather strongly convex: cilia ochreous-yellow, on costa purple-fuscous, at anal angle with a broad deep purple bar. Hindwings with veins 6 and 7 stalked; rather dark fuscous-grey; cilia pale ochreous-yellowish, above apex with a grey line near base.

== Biology ==
The larvae tunnel in the bark of Eucalyptus species (including Eucalyptus rossii), feeding on the inner bark or on the adventitious bark growth around the holes left by wood-boring beetles.
