= Ogmograptis =

Scientific classification
- Domain: Eukaryota
- Kingdom: Animalia
- Phylum: Arthropoda
- Class: Insecta
- Order: Lepidoptera
- Family: Bucculatricidae
- Genus: Ogmograptis; Meyrick, 1935

Type species
- O. scribula

Genus containing the scribbly gum moths

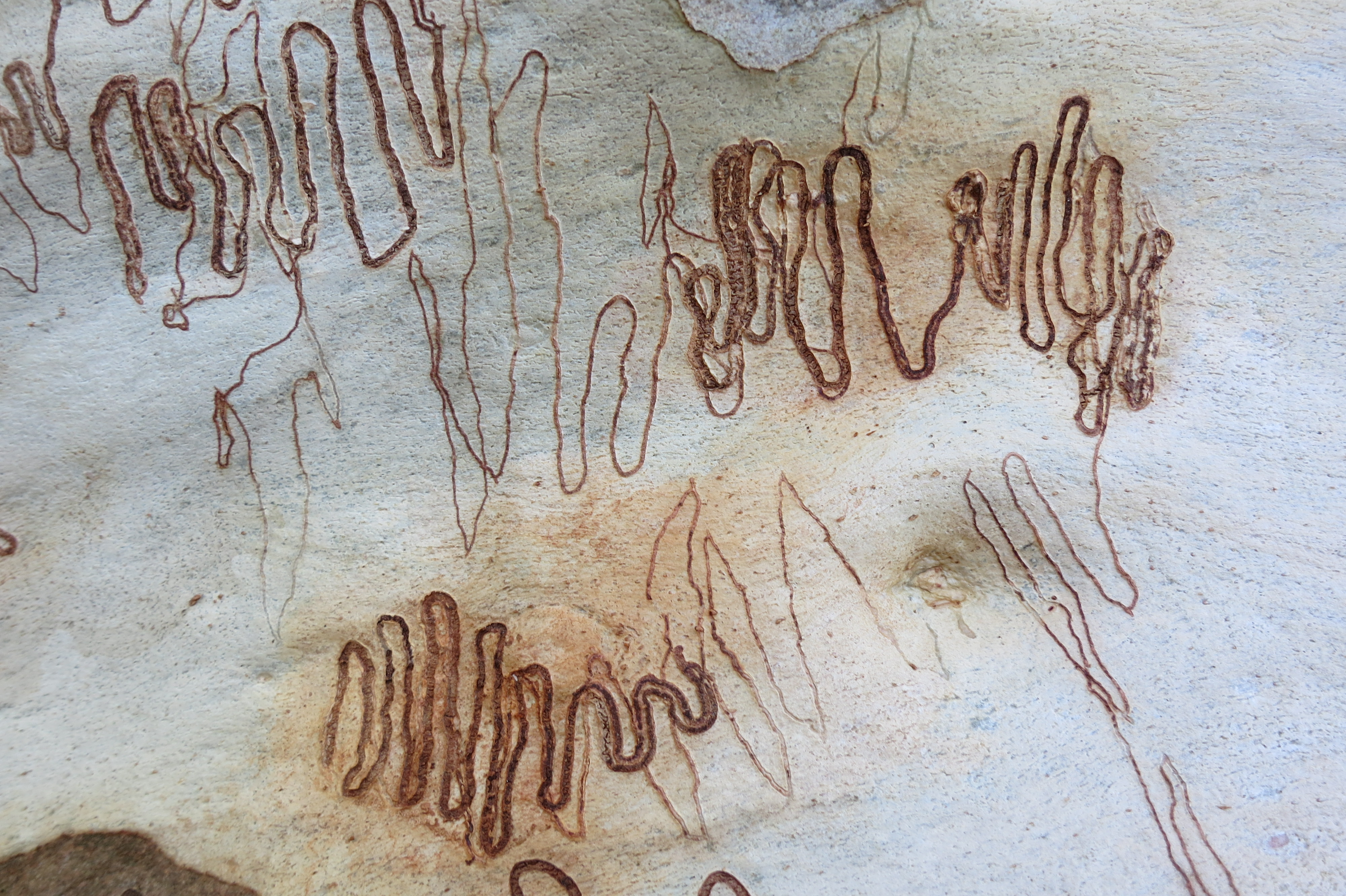
Scribbles on Eucalyptus haemastoma probably from O. racemosa

Ogmograptis, the scribbly gum moth, is a genus in the family Bucculatricidae and was first described by Edward Meyrick in 1935, as a monotypic genus (consisting of one species only). They are found in the Australian Capital Territory, New South Wales and Queensland. However, in 2007, Cooke and Edwards argued that the patterning of the scribbles was different for each of the three eucalypts, Eucalyptus pauciflora, E. racemosa ssp. rossii, and E. delegatensis) and that it was likely that these differing patterns were caused by larvae from different species of scribbly gum moths.

== Taxonomy ==
In 2012, Horak et al. published a new account of the genus, describing eleven new species of Ogmograptis, and distinguishing three groups, the scribula, maxdayi and triradiata groups.

The groupings of Ogmograptis given by Horak et al. are shown below:

- - scribula group
    - O. scribula Meyrick 1935
    - O. fraxinoides Horak 2012
    - O. racemosa Horak 2012
    - O. pilularis Horak 2012
  - maxdayi group
    - - O. maxdayi Horak 2012
      - O. barloworum Horak 2012
      - O. paucidentatus Horak 2012
      - O. rodens Horak 2012
      - O. bignathifer Horak 2012
      - O. inornatus Horak 2012
  - triradiata group
    - O. bipunctatus Horak 2012
    - O. pulcher Horak 2012
    - O. triradiata Turner 1926 (Cateristis)
    - O. centrospila Turner 1923 (Opostega)

One species, Ogmograptis notosema Meyrick 1922 (Cryphioxena), was unable to be assigned to a group as no holotype could be located.

In allocating these three groups to the genus Ogmograptis, Horak et al. (2012) note that it is the scribula group which produces the bark scribbles, and that the larval biology of the maxdayi and triradiata groups is not known.
