= Telecrates tesselata =

Scientific classification
- Domain: Eukaryota
- Kingdom: Animalia
- Phylum: Arthropoda
- Class: Insecta
- Order: Lepidoptera
- Family: Xyloryctidae
- Genus: Telecrates
- Species: T. tesselata

Binomial name
- Telecrates tesselata T. P. Lucas, 1900

Species of moth

Telecrates tesselata is a moth in the family of Xyloryctidae. It was described by Thomas Pennington Lucas in 1900. It is found in Australia, where it has been recorded from Queensland.

The wingspan is about 20 mm. The forewings have a large pear-shaped blotch of white from the costa at the base widening to the inner margin and a second cream-white blotch from one-eighth to one-fourth the costa, obliquely outward to the middle of the wing. There is a third blotch from before the middle to half the costa as a band across the wing, widening out beyond the middle, and filling the inner margin from half to three-fourths the inner margin, the edge rounded and finely dentate. A fourth blotch is found to three-fourths the costa, reaching half across the wing, the posterior border twice dentate. There is also a hindmarginal narrow band drawn to a line to the anal angle. The hindwings are ochreous yellow diffused with fuscous along hindmargin chiefly over the apex.
