= Telecrates basileia =

Scientific classification
- Kingdom: Animalia
- Phylum: Arthropoda
- Clade: Pancrustacea
- Class: Insecta
- Order: Lepidoptera
- Family: Xyloryctidae
- Genus: Telecrates
- Species: T. basileia

Binomial name
- Telecrates basileia (Turner, 1902)

Synonyms
- Xylorycta basileia Turner, 1902

Species of moth

Telecrates basileia is a moth in the family Xyloryctidae. It was described by Alfred Jefferis Turner in 1902. It is found in Australia, where it has been recorded from the Northern Territory, Queensland and Western Australia.

The wingspan is 17–19 mm. The forewings are deep shining purple and the extreme base and a median band are golden-yellow. The median band is transverse and biconcave. The hindwings are grey, towards the base ochreous-tinged.
