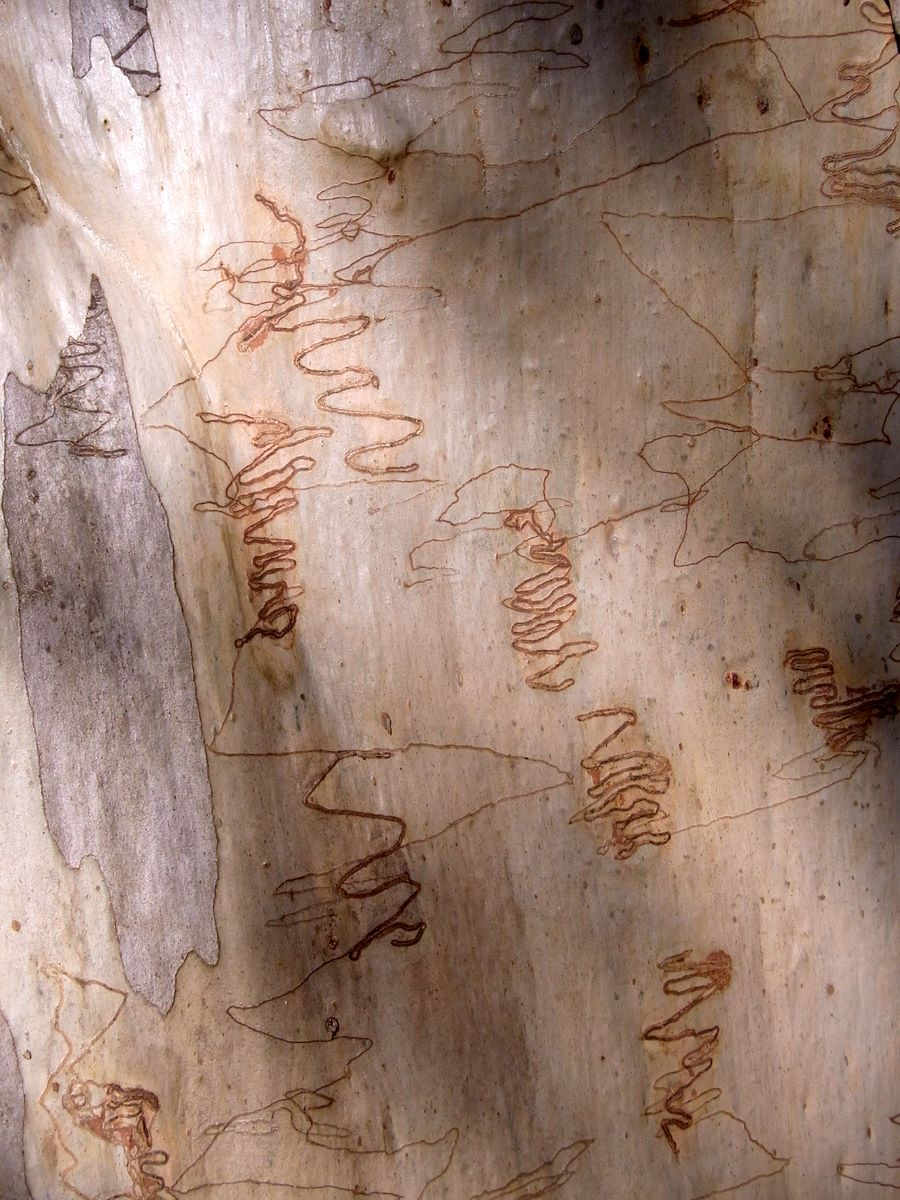
- Scribbly gum at Lawson, New South Wales, Blue Mountains (Australia)

Scientific classification
- Kingdom: Plantae
- Clade: Tracheophytes
- Clade: Angiosperms
- Clade: Eudicots
- Clade: Rosids
- Order: Myrtales
- Family: Myrtaceae
- Genus: Eucalyptus
- Species: E. sclerophylla

Binomial name
- Eucalyptus sclerophylla (Blakely) L.A.S.Johnson & Blaxell

Synonyms
- Eucalyptus haemostoma var. sclerophylla Blakely; Eucalyptus racemosa Cav.

= Eucalyptus sclerophylla =

Scribbly gum

Species of eucalyptus

Eucalyptus sclerophylla, known as the scribbly gum, is a tree native to eastern Australia. Very similar to the related Scribbly Gum (E. haemastoma), a better known tree. The best way of distinguishing the species is the smaller hemispherical to pear shaped gumnuts of Eucalyptus sclerophylla, being 0.6 cm by 0.6 cm in size. Flower buds are also smaller. sclerophylla literally means hard leaf. Both species have hard leaves, but Eucalyptus sclerophylla's leaves are particularly hard edged.

Occurring on the poorer sandstone soils in mid to high rainfall areas. Around Sydney it often occurs on the higher ridges, where the soil is drier and less fertile. It ranges north from Jervis Bay, to near the Watagan district near Newcastle.

A small to medium-sized tree, up to 20 metres tall, usually seen around 6 metres tall. Smooth barked, with shedding bark of white or grey. Scribbles often found on the bark. Leaves 5 to 16 cm long, 2 to 4 cm wide. Almost a glossy green, on both sides of the leaf. White flowers form between November and February.
