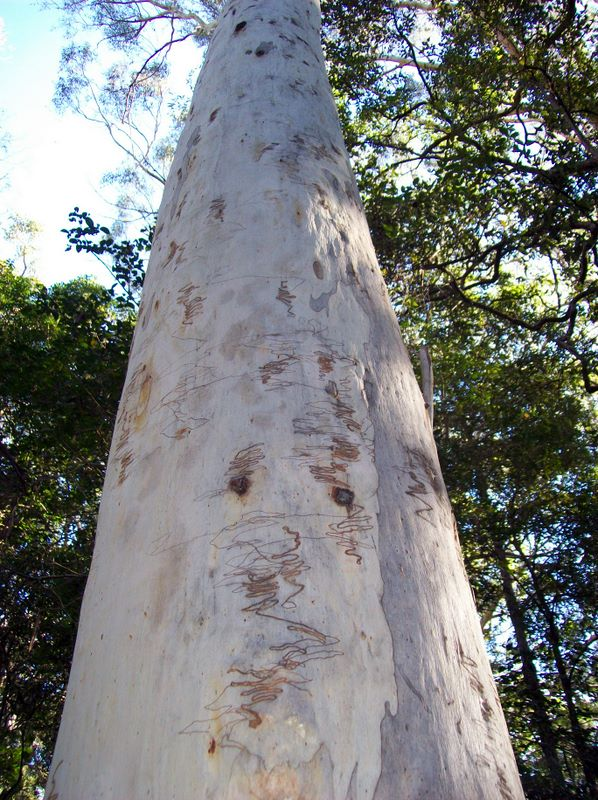
- a tall Scribbly Gum at Coffs Harbour, Australia

Scientific classification
- Kingdom: Plantae
- Clade: Tracheophytes
- Clade: Angiosperms
- Clade: Eudicots
- Clade: Rosids
- Order: Myrtales
- Family: Myrtaceae
- Genus: Eucalyptus
- Species: E. signata

Binomial name
- Eucalyptus signata F.Muell.

Synonyms
- Eucalyptus micrantha var. signata (F.Muell.) Blakely; Eucalyptus racemosa var. signata (F.Muell.) R.D.Johnst. & Marryatt; Eucalyptus racemosa Cav.

= Eucalyptus signata =

Scribbly Gum

Species of eucalyptus

Eucalyptus signata is a species of evergreen tree native to eastern Australia. It is one of many trees known as the Scribbly Gum. The habitat is dry sclerophyll forests or swampy areas at low altitude. Occurring from Morisset, New South Wales up the coast and ranges to beyond the Queensland border. The original specimen was collected at the Brisbane River.

== Description ==
A small to medium-sized tree, up to 25 metres tall. Closely related to Eucalyptus haemastoma, however with smaller flower buds and gumnuts. Fruit more hemispherical being 7mm by 7mm in size. The bark is typical of the scribbly gum, being blotchy white with scribbles caused by the scribbly gum moths. White flowers form between July and September.
