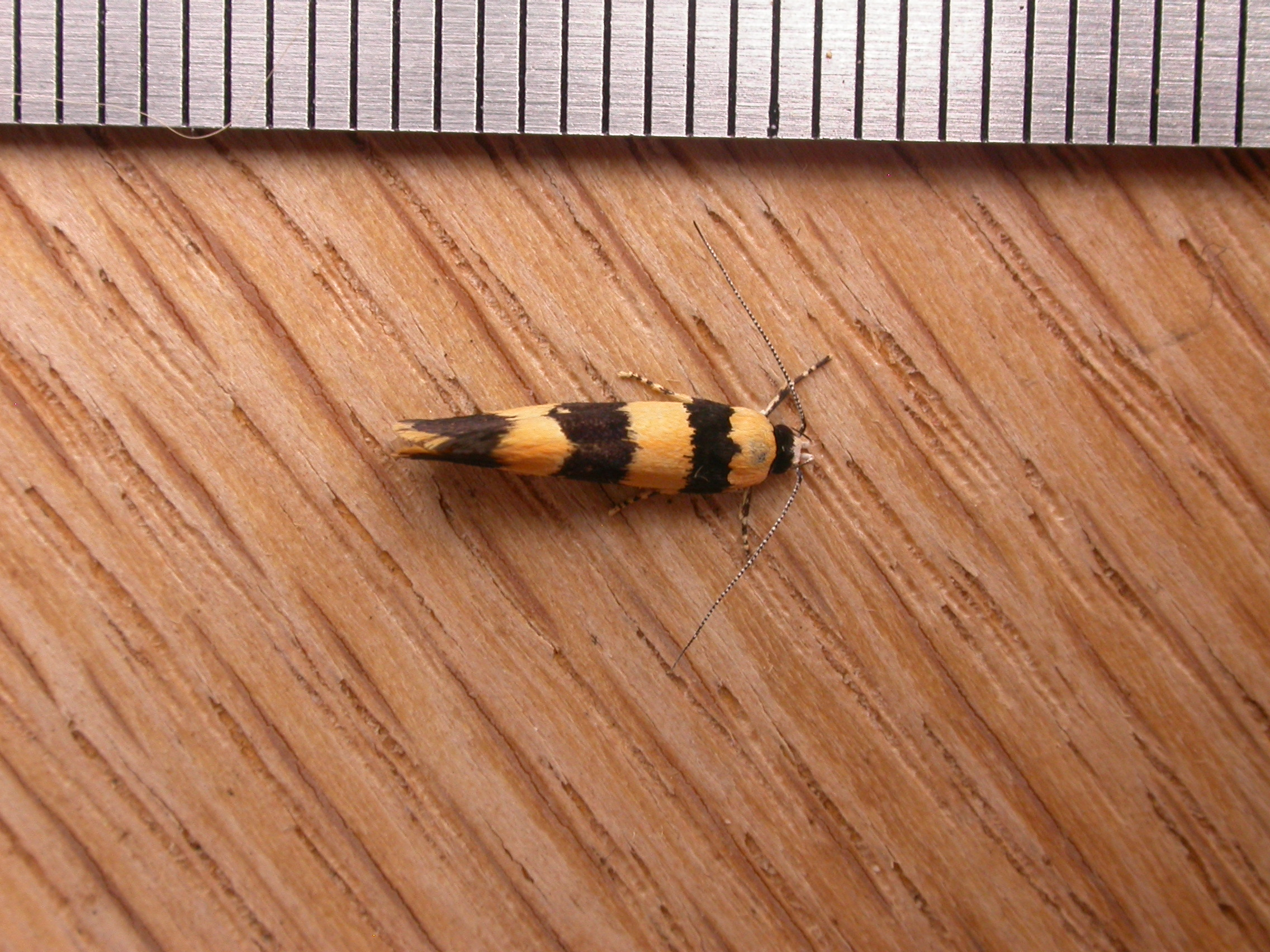

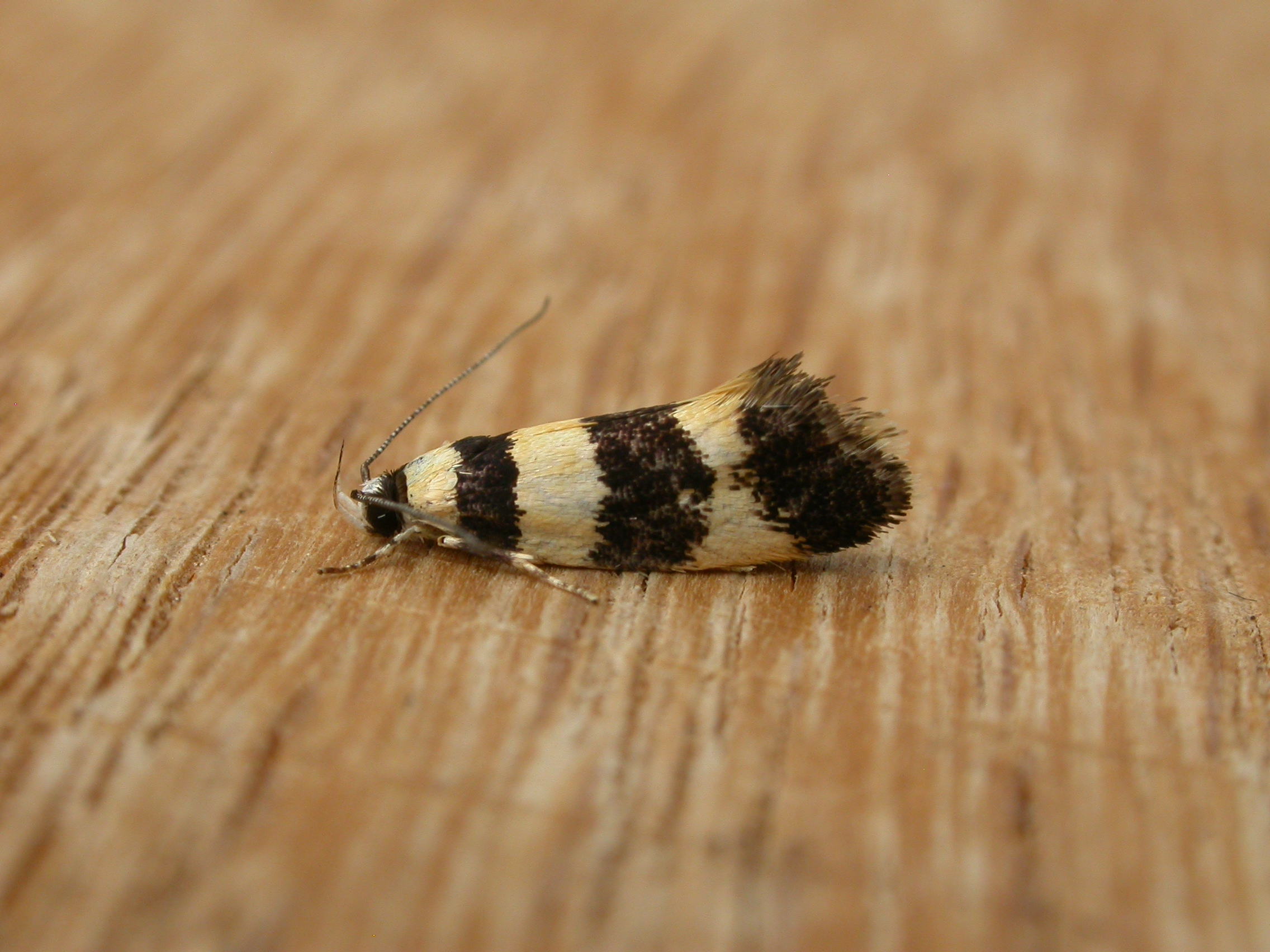

Scientific classification
- Kingdom: Animalia
- Phylum: Arthropoda
- Class: Insecta
- Order: Lepidoptera
- Family: Xyloryctidae
- Genus: Telecrates
- Species: T. melanochrysa

Binomial name
- Telecrates melanochrysa (Turner, 1939)

Synonyms
- Xylorycta melanochrysa Turner, 1939

= Telecrates melanochrysa =

Species of moth

Telecrates melanochrysa is a moth of the family Xyloryctidae. It is known in Australia from the Australian Capital Territory, New South Wales, Tasmania and Victoria.

The wingspan is about 24 mm.
