= Telecrates desmochrysa =

Scientific classification
- Domain: Eukaryota
- Kingdom: Animalia
- Phylum: Arthropoda
- Class: Insecta
- Order: Lepidoptera
- Family: Xyloryctidae
- Genus: Telecrates
- Species: T. desmochrysa

Binomial name
- Telecrates desmochrysa Lower, 1896

Species of moth

Telecrates desmochrysa is a moth in the family Xyloryctidae. It was described by Oswald Bertram Lower in 1896. It is found in Australia, where it has been recorded from South Australia.

The wingspan is about 16 mm. The forewings are black with ochreous markings and a narrow oblique fascia from the costa at the base to about one-eighth the inner margin. There is an oblique fascia from beneath the costa at one-fourth to below the middle of the disc at about one-fourth. The upper portion is somewhat irregular and broken and there is a similar fascia in the middle of the wing, not reaching either margin, with a semi-circular excavation on the lower portion of the anterior edge, as well as an irregular spot on the costa at about five-sixths and a dentate (tooth-like) line immediately beneath this, somewhat curved, not reaching but approaching the anal angle. The hindwings are bronzy fuscous with a well-marked wedge-shaped orange spot along the base, but not reaching the inner margin.

The larvae possibly feed on Banksia species.
