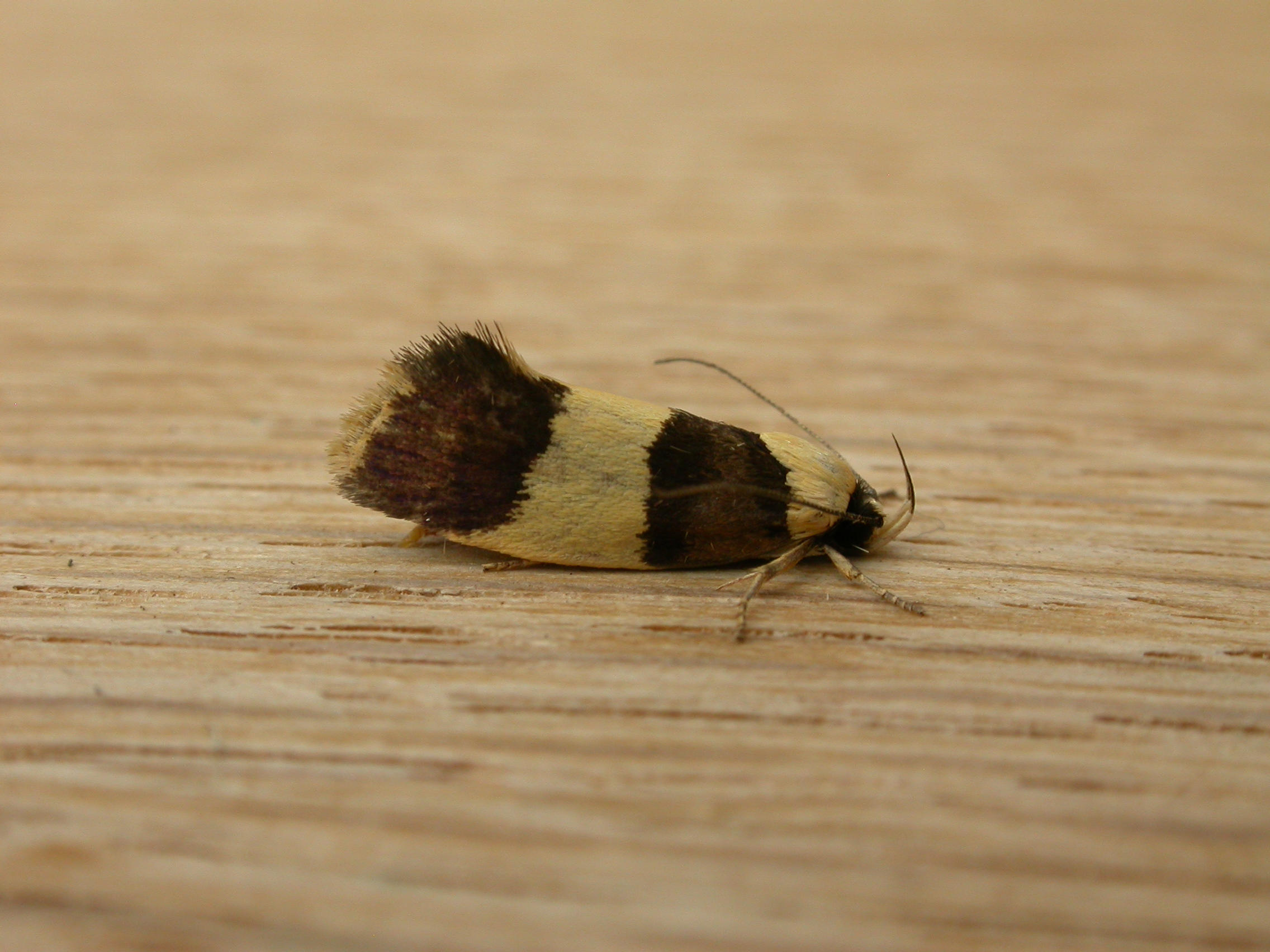
- Telecrates laetiorella

Scientific classification
- Domain: Eukaryota
- Kingdom: Animalia
- Phylum: Arthropoda
- Class: Insecta
- Order: Lepidoptera
- Family: Xyloryctidae
- Genus: Telecrates; Meyrick, 1890

= Telecrates =

Moth genus in family Xyloryctidae

Telecrates is a genus of moths of the family Xyloryctidae.

== Species ==
- Telecrates basileia (Turner, 1902)
- Telecrates desmochrysa Lower, 1896
- Telecrates laetiorella (Walker, 1864)
- Telecrates melanochrysa (Turner, 1939)
- Telecrates tesselata Lucas, 1900
