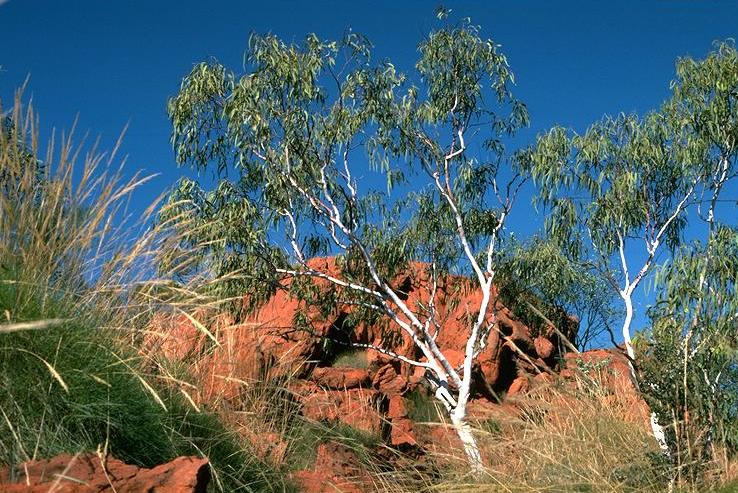
- Eucalyptus cupularis near Halls Creek

Scientific classification
- Kingdom: Plantae
- Clade: Tracheophytes
- Clade: Angiosperms
- Clade: Eudicots
- Clade: Rosids
- Order: Myrtales
- Family: Myrtaceae
- Genus: Eucalyptus
- Species: E. cupularis

Binomial name
- Eucalyptus cupularis C.A.Gardner

= Eucalyptus cupularis =

Halls Creek white gum

Species of eucalyptus

Eucalyptus cupularis, commonly known as the Halls Creek white gum, or in the local indigenous Djaru peoples' language as wawulinggi, is a species of small tree that is endemic to an area in northwestern Australia. It has smooth, powdery white bark, lance-shaped or curved adult leaves, flower buds in groups of seven, white flowers and cup-shaped to conical fruit.

== Description ==
Eucalyptus cupularis is a tree that typically grows to a height of 5–9 m (16–30 ft), sometimes as high as 12 m (39 ft), and forms a lignotuber. It has powdery, white smooth bark that is pale pink when young. Young plants and coppice regrowth have stems that are square in cross-section and egg-shaped leaves that are 80–140 mm (3.1–5.5 in) long and 40–80 mm (1.6–3.1 in) wide. Adult leaves are the same dull green on both sides, lance-shaped or curved, 100–230 mm (3.9–9.1 in) long and 9–27 mm (0.35–1.06 in) wide on a petiole 15–35 mm (0.59–1.38 in) long. The flower buds are arranged in groups of seven on an unbranched peduncle 10–20 mm (0.39–0.79 in) long, the individual buds usually sessile. Mature buds are oval, glaucous, 7.5–14 mm (0.30–0.55 in) long and 4–9 mm (0.16–0.35 in) wide with a rounded to conical operculum. Flowering occurs between October and November and the flowers are white. The fruit is a woody cup-shaped to conical capsule 5–12 mm (0.20–0.47 in) long and 7–12 mm (0.28–0.47 in) wide with the valves protruding above the rim.

Eucalyptus cupularis is similar in appearance to and closely related to the Kalumburu gum (E. herbertiana) and the mountain white gum (E. mooreana).

== Taxonomy and naming ==
Eucalyptus cupularis was first formally described by the botanist Charles Austin Gardner in 1964 from a specimen collected on stony hills to the west of Halls Creek and the description was published in the Journal of the Royal Society of Western Australia. The specific epithet (cupularis) is the diminutive form of the Latin word cupa meaning "cup", hence "little cup", referring to the shape of the fruit.

== Distribution and habitat ==
The range of Halls Creek white gum extends from the Kimberley region of Western Australia and into the Northern Territory where it grows in open woodland on stony hills and along watercourses in skeletal soils over sandstone or granite.

== See also ==
- List of Eucalyptus species
