= Cryphioxena =

Scientific classification
- Kingdom: Animalia
- Phylum: Arthropoda
- Class: Insecta
- Order: Lepidoptera
- Family: Elachistidae
- Subfamily: Elachistinae
- Genus: Cryphioxena; Meyrick, 1921

Genus of moths

Cryphioxena is a genus of moths in subfamily Elachistinae that was described in 1921 by Edward Meyrick. Although it is generally considered part of family Elachistidae, subfamily Elachistinae, some authors place the genus in family Bucculatricidae instead.

It contains the species Cryphioxena notosema and Cryphioxena haplomorpha.
