= Cryphioxena notosema =

Scientific classification
- Kingdom: Animalia
- Phylum: Arthropoda
- Clade: Pancrustacea
- Class: Insecta
- Order: Lepidoptera
- Family: Elachistidae
- Genus: Cryphioxena
- Species: C. notosema

Binomial name
- Cryphioxena notosema Meyrick, 1922

Synonyms
- Ogmograptis notosema; Elachista notosema

Australian species of moth

Cryphioxena notosema is a moth of the family Elachistidae. It was described in 1922 by Edward Meyrick. Some authors place the genus Cryphioxena, including this species, in family Bucculatricidae instead. It is found in Australia.
