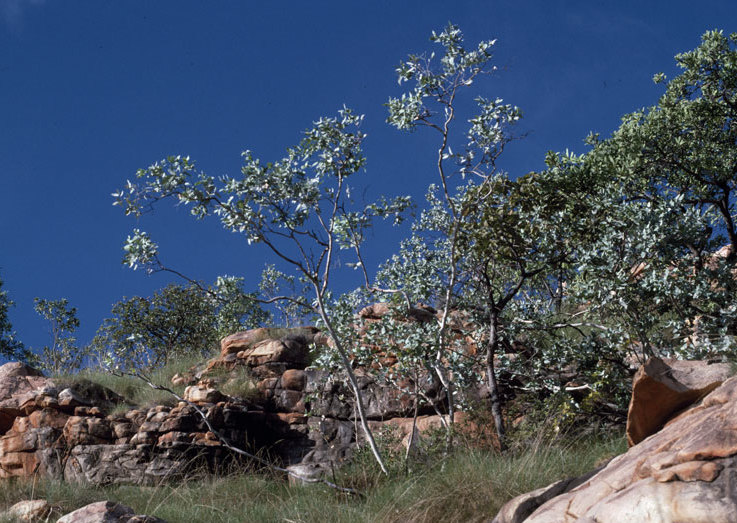
- Eucalyptus mooreana near Fern Creek on the Gibb River Road

Conservation status
- Near Threatened (IUCN 3.1)

- Vulnerable (EPBC Act)

Scientific classification
- Kingdom: Plantae
- Clade: Tracheophytes
- Clade: Angiosperms
- Clade: Eudicots
- Clade: Rosids
- Order: Myrtales
- Family: Myrtaceae
- Genus: Eucalyptus
- Species: E. mooreana

Binomial name
- Eucalyptus mooreana W.Fitzg.

= Eucalyptus mooreana =

Mountain white gum

Species of eucalyptus

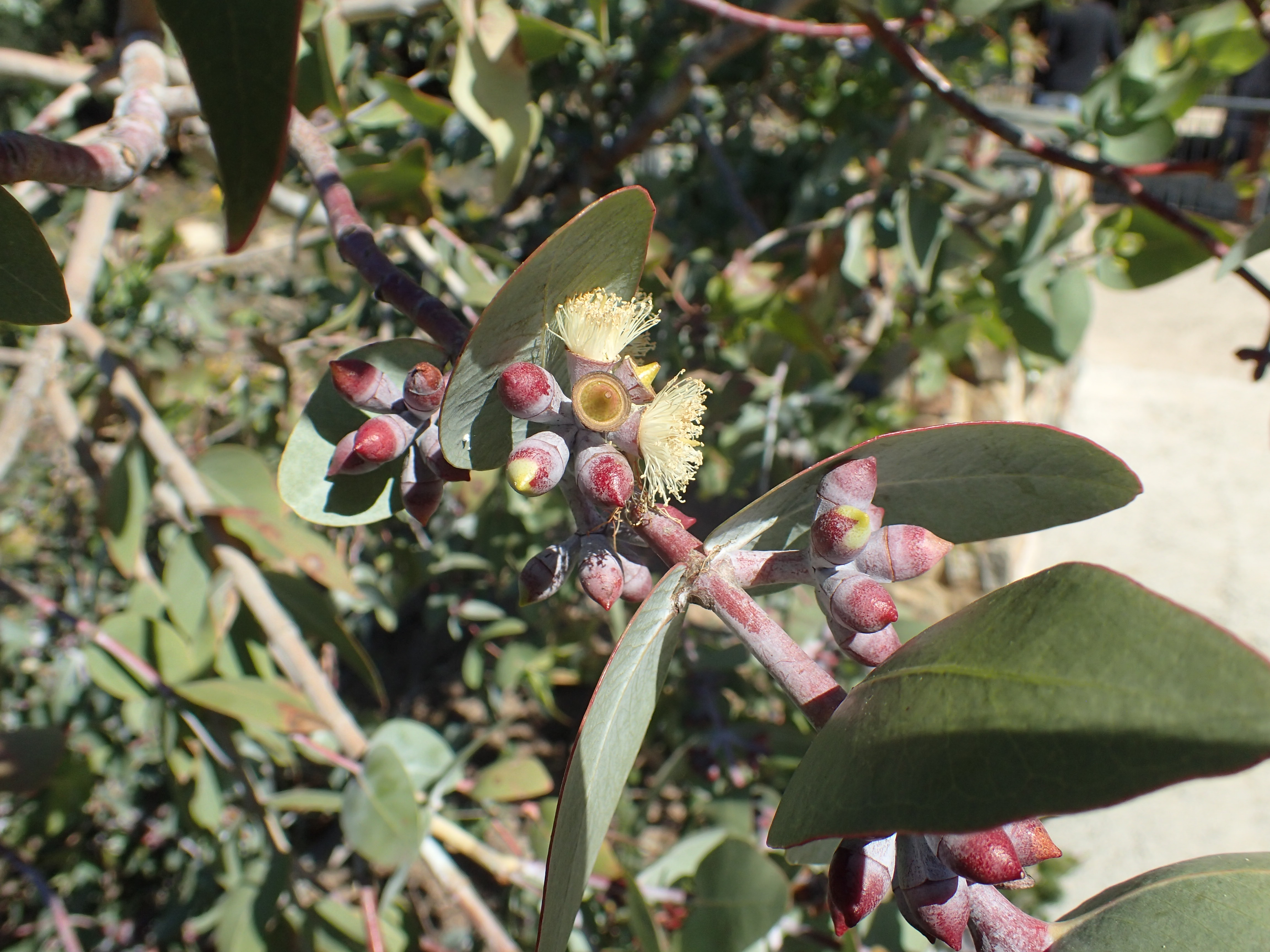
Stem-clasping leaves, flower buds and flowers

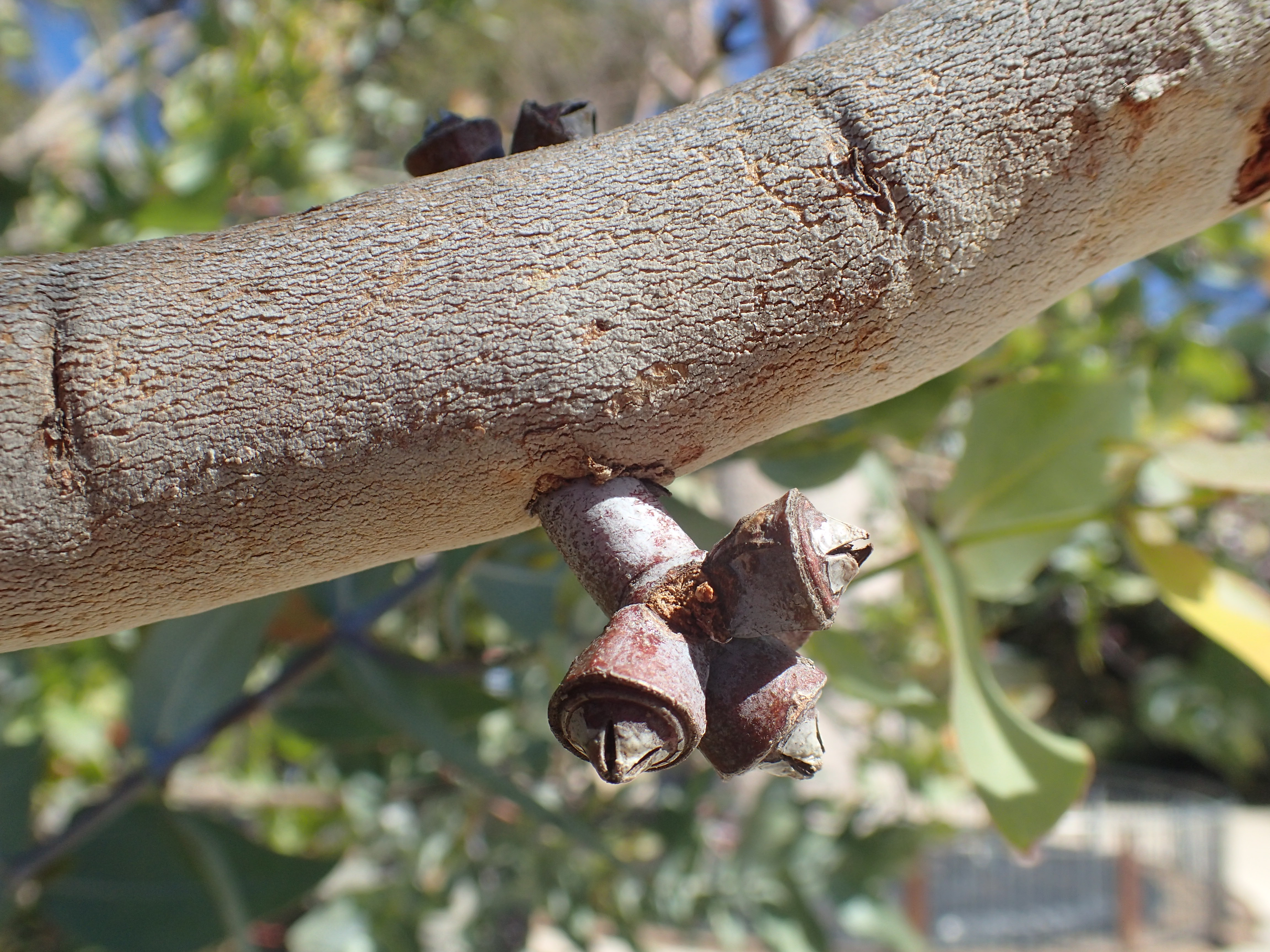
Fruit

Eucalyptus mooreana, commonly known as Moore's gum, mountain white gum or King Leopold Range mallee, is a species of stunted, straggly tree or mallee that is endemic to the Kimberley region of Western Australia. It has smooth, powdery white bark, a crown of juvenile, sessile, stem-clasping leaves arranged in opposite pairs, flower buds arranged in groups of seven, white flowers and cup-shaped to hemispherical fruit.

== Description ==
Eucalyptus mooreana is a straggly tree or mallee that typically grows to a height of 2.5–9 m (8 ft 2 in – 29 ft 6 in) and often has a crooked trunk. It has smooth white, powdery bark that is shed annually to reveal pale pink new bark, and small branches that are glaucous. The leave in the crown are juvenile leaves that are sessile, stem-clasping, elliptical to heart-shaped or almost round, sometimes lance-shaped, 6–13 mm (0.24–0.51 in) long and 3–8 mm (0.12–0.31 in) wide and arranged in opposite pairs. The leaves are the same shade of dull greyish green to glaucous on both sides. The flower buds are arranged in leaf axils in groups of seven on an unbranched peduncle 7–18 mm (0.28–0.71 in) long, the individual buds usually sessile. Mature buds are oval to diamond-shaped, 10–12 mm (0.39–0.47 in) long and 5–7 mm (0.20–0.28 in) wide and red or maroon with a glaucous covering and a conical operculum. Flowering occurs between May and August and the flowers are creamy white. The fruit is a woody, cup-shaped to hemispherical capsule 6–8 mm (0.24–0.31 in) long and wide with the valves protruding above the rim. Eucalyptus mooreana is similar in appearance to, and closely related to the kalumburu gum (E. herbertiana) and Halls Creek white gum (E. cupularis) but can be distinguished from them by its crown of stem-clasping, juvenile leaves.

== Taxonomy and naming ==
Eucalyptus mooreana was formally described by William Vincent Fitzgerald and the description was published in "The Western Mail" newspaper on 2 June 1906. The specific epithet (mooreana) honours Newton James Moore who was Minister of Lands at the time. Further descriptions of the species as E. mooreana (W.V.Fitzg.) Maiden were published in 1920 by Joseph Maiden in his book A Critical Revision of the genus Eucalyptus but the Australian Plant Census accepts Fitzgerald's original 1906 publication.

== Distribution and habitat ==
Eucalyptus mooreana is found on steep rocky slopes and summits in a small area of the Kimberley region of Western Australia where it grows in red sandy soils over sandstone or quartzite in the Wunaamin Miliwundi Ranges. It is isolated to six separate populations, five of which are in conservation areas and one on a pastoral lease spread over a combined area of 295 square kilometres (114 sq mi). One of the populations comprised 150 individual plants while the others have not been surveyed. It is found at reasonable high elevations including the summit of Mount Broome at 3,060 ft (930 m), Bold Bluff 2,760 ft (840 m) and Mount Leake 2,246 ft (685 m).

== Conservation status ==
In 2008 the species is listed as "vulnerable" under the Australian Federal Government Environment Protection and Biodiversity Conservation Act 1999 and as "Threatened Flora (Declared Rare Flora — Extant)" by the Department of Environment and Conservation (Western Australia) meaning that it is likely to become extinct or is rare, or otherwise in need of special protection. The main threats to the species are fire and grazing by cattle. It was listed as a near threatened species by the International Union for the Conservation of Nature in 2019.

== See also ==
- List of Eucalyptus species
