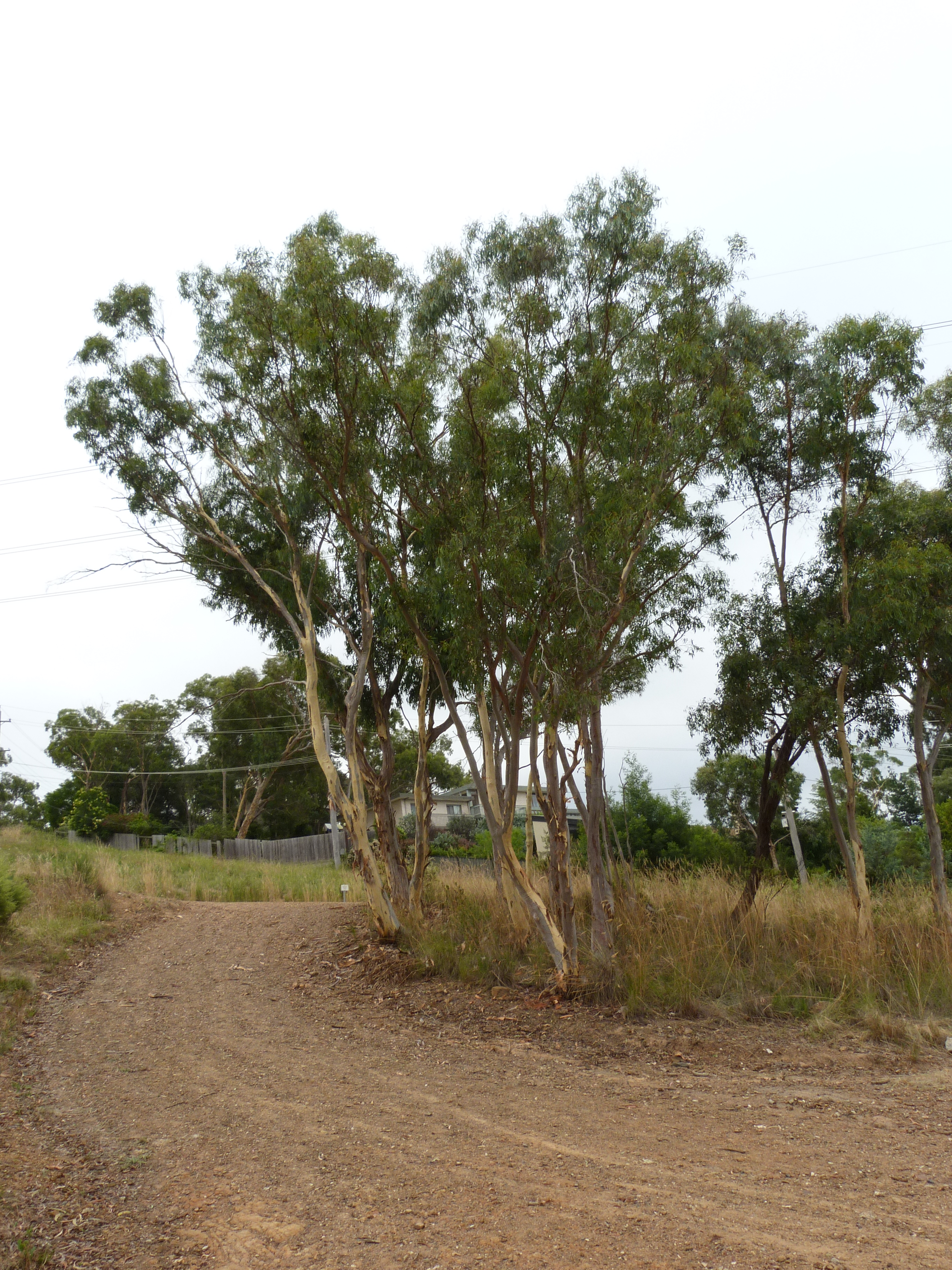
- Eucalyptus rossii in the Aranda Bushland

Scientific classification
- Kingdom: Plantae
- Clade: Embryophytes
- Clade: Tracheophytes
- Clade: Spermatophytes
- Clade: Angiosperms
- Clade: Eudicots
- Clade: Rosids
- Order: Myrtales
- Family: Myrtaceae
- Genus: Eucalyptus
- Species: E. rossii

Binomial name
- Eucalyptus rossii R.T.Baker & H.G.Sm.

Synonyms
- Eucalyptus racemosa subsp. rossii (R.T.Baker & H.G.Sm.) B.E.Pfeil & Henwood

= Eucalyptus rossii =

Inland scribbly gum

Species of eucalyptus

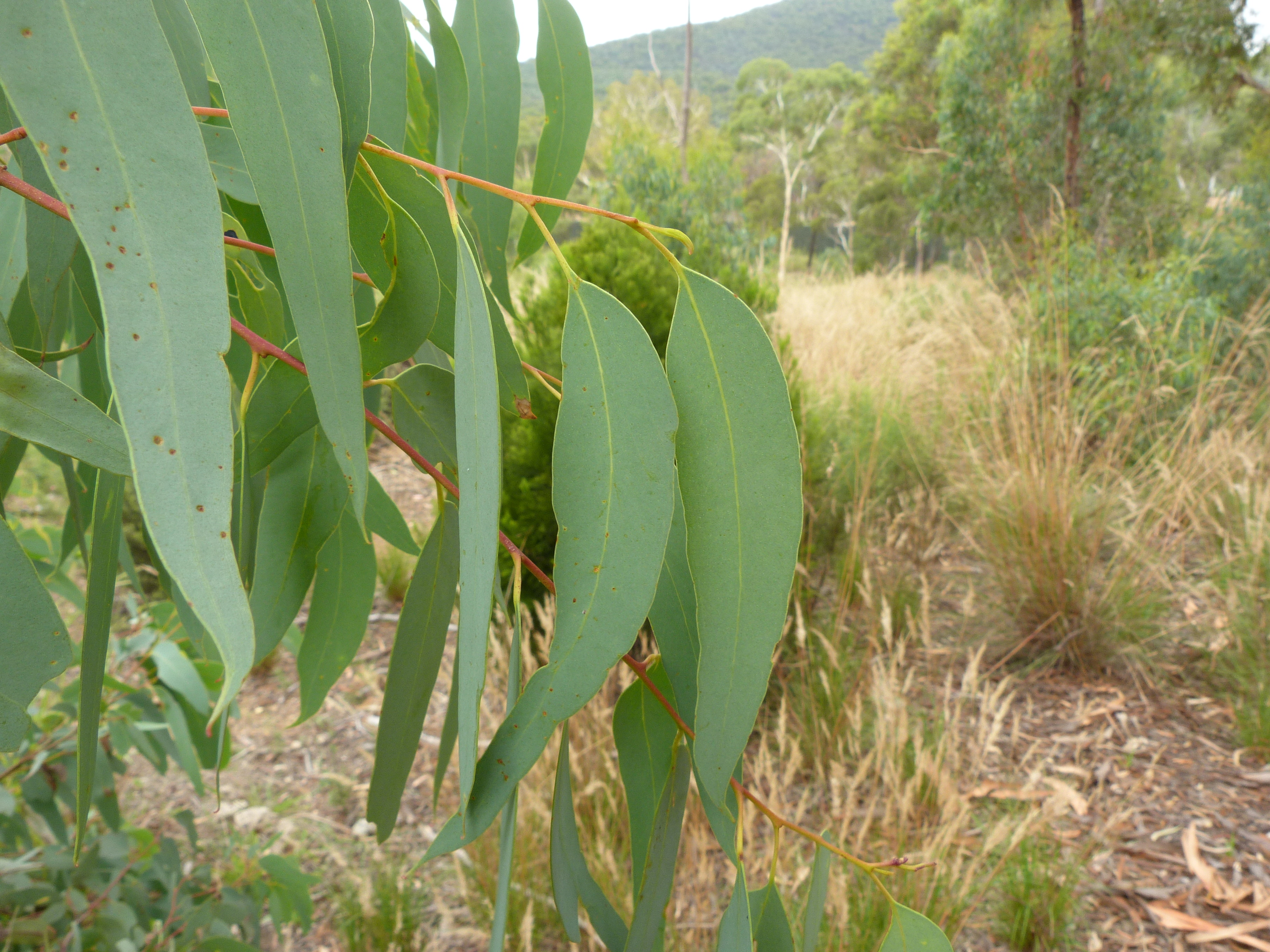
Foliage

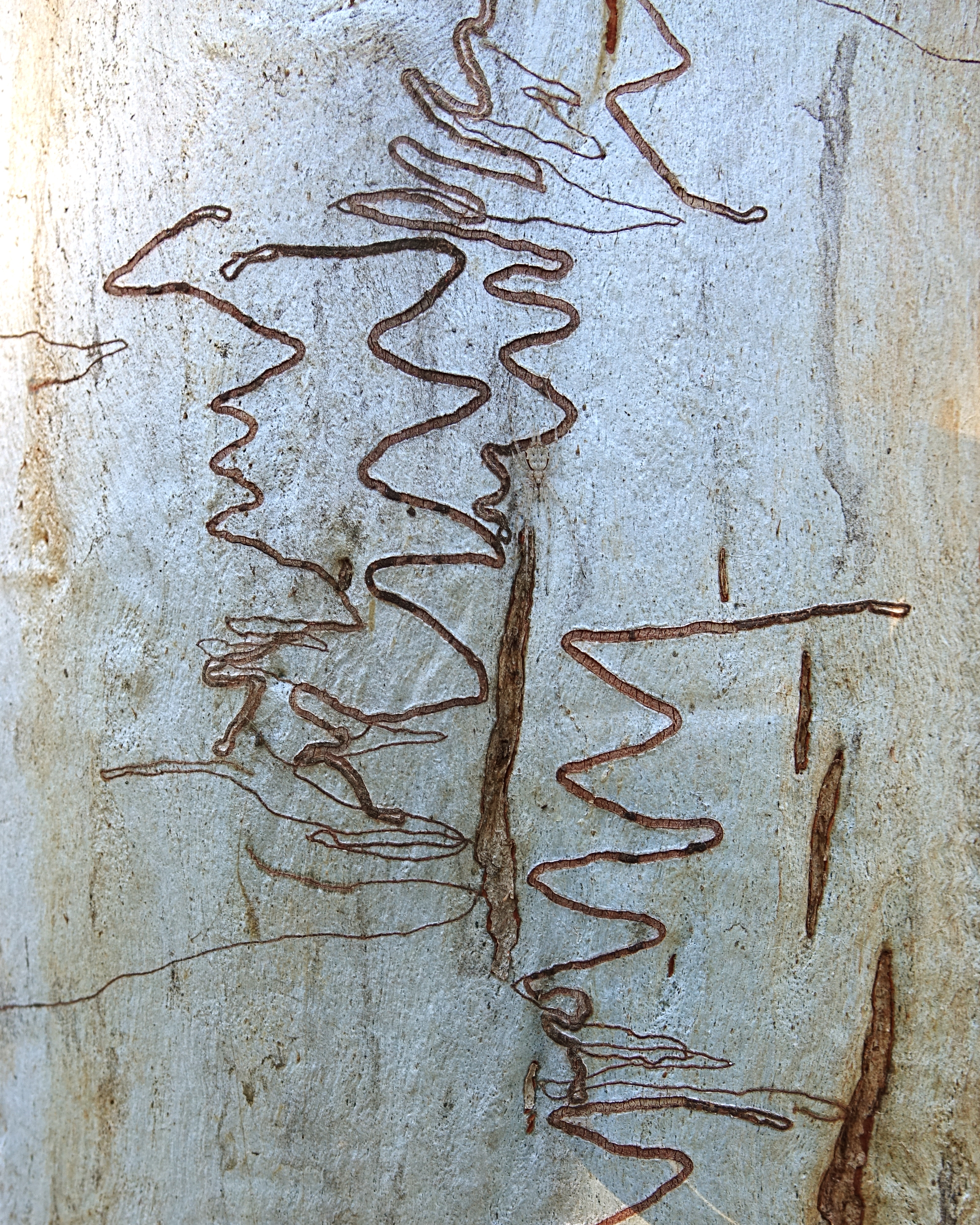
Bark

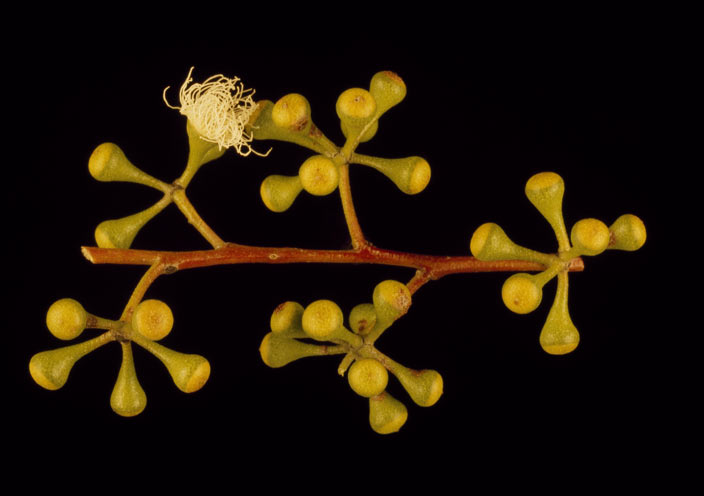
Buds

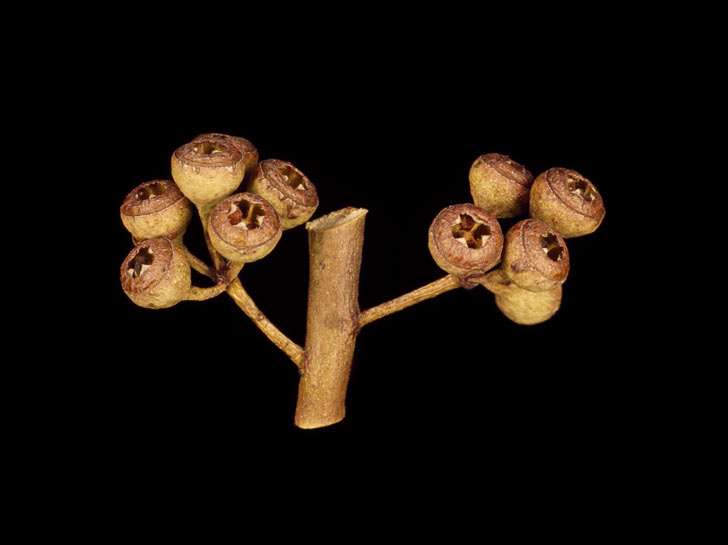
Fruit

Eucalyptus rossii, commonly known as inland scribbly gum or white gum, is a species of small to medium-sized tree that is endemic to New South Wales and the Australian Capital Territory. It has smooth bark with insect scribbles, lance-shaped adult leaves, flower buds in groups of between nine and fifteen, white flowers and hemispherical or shortened spherical fruit.

== Description ==
Eucalyptus rossii is a tree that typically grows to a height of around 15 to 20 m (49 to 66 ft) and forms a lignotuber. It normally has a solitary straight trunk and an open, moderately dense crown that reaches a width of about 9 m (30 ft). The smooth yellowish bark sheds in patches throughout the year and usually has insect scribbles. Young plants and coppice regrowth have lance-shaped, narrow lance-shaped or curved leaves that are 70–140 mm (2.8–5.5 in) long and 15–40 mm (0.59–1.57 in) wide. Adult leaves are arranged alternately, the same shade of green on both sides, narrow lance-shaped to lance-shaped, 55–150 mm (2.2–5.9 in) long and 8–25 mm (0.31–0.98 in) wide, tapering to a petiole 7–20 mm (0.28–0.79 in) long.

The flower buds are mostly arranged in leaf axils in clusters of between five and fifteen on an unbranched peduncle 7–11 mm (0.28–0.43 in) long, the individual buds on pedicels 3–6 mm (0.12–0.24 in) long. Mature buds are oval to club-shaped, 3–5 mm (0.12–0.20 in) long and 2–3 mm (0.079–0.118 in) wide with a rounded operculum. Flowering occurs between September and February and the flowers are white. The fruit is a woody, cup-shaped, hemispherical or shortened spherical capsule 3–6 mm (0.12–0.24 in) long and 4–6 mm (0.16–0.24 in) wide with the valves near rim level.

== Taxonomy ==
Eucalyptus rossii was first formally described in 1902 by the botanist Richard Thomas Baker and chemist Henry George Smith in A Research on the Eucalypts especially in regard to their Essential Oils. The specific epithet (rossii) honours William John Clunies-Ross (1850-1914), for his attention to the flora of the Bathurst region.

== Distribution and habitat ==
Inland scribbly gum has a scattered distribution over the New South Wales tablelands, western slopes and the central coast, from Tenterfield in the north to Bombala in the south. The trees grow well in sandy and stony well-drained soils, usually on slopes. They are found in areas with moderate temperatures and rainfall of 600 to 1,000 mm (24 to 39 in) per annum. They are part of open dry sclerophyll woodland communities and associated species include E. haemastoma and E. racemosa.

== Ecology ==
These trees usually have scribble marks on the bark formed by the burrowing larvae of a small moth, Ogmograptis scribula. The insect lays eggs within layers of bark and when the larvae hatch they burrow into the bark.

== Use in horticulture ==
E. rossii is available commercially in seed form or as seedlings. It is useful as a shade tree which grows well in full sun with well drained soils that can cope in poor shallow, stony soils. It is both drought and frost tolerant with a flower display through summer that will attract birds.

== See also ==
- List of Eucalyptus species
