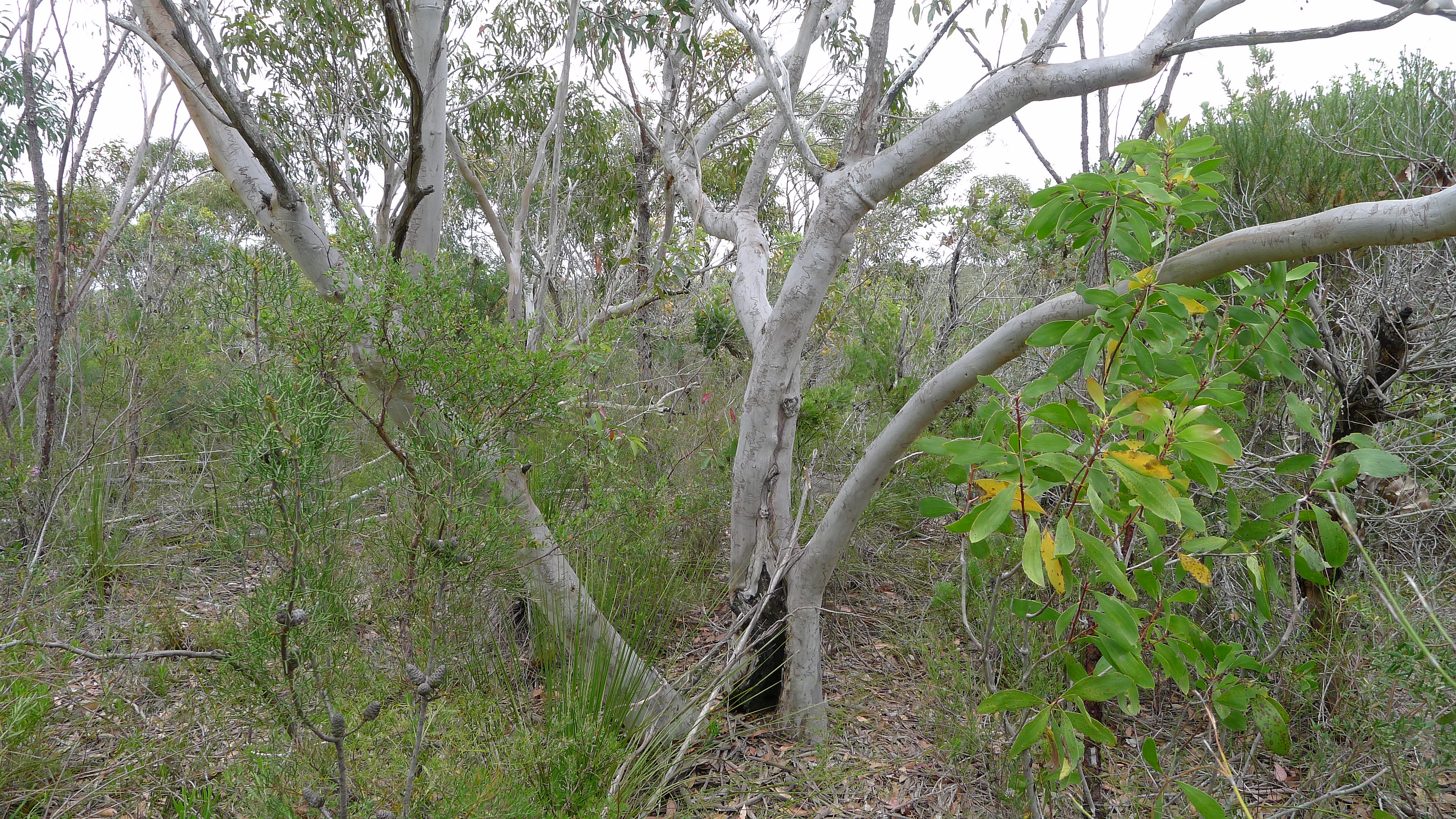
- Eucalyptus haemastoma in the Royal National Park

Scientific classification
- Kingdom: Plantae
- Clade: Tracheophytes
- Clade: Angiosperms
- Clade: Eudicots
- Clade: Rosids
- Order: Myrtales
- Family: Myrtaceae
- Genus: Eucalyptus
- Species: E. haemastoma

Binomial name
- Eucalyptus haemastoma Sm.
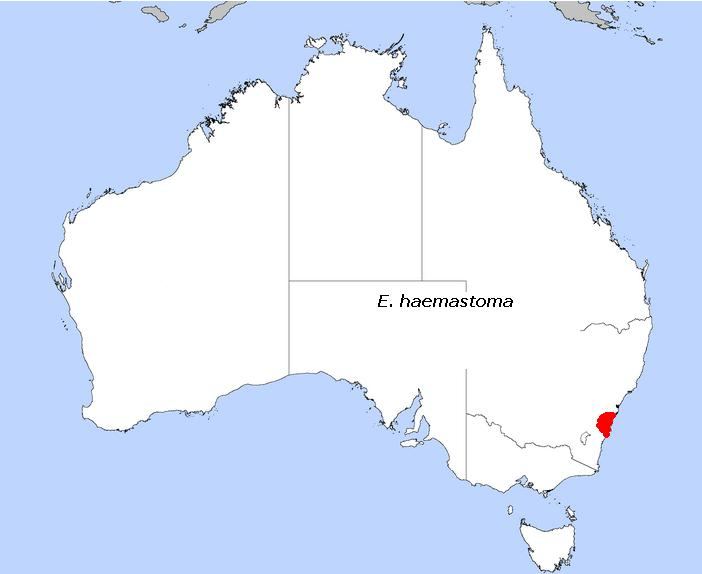
- Eucalyptus haemastoma, field distribution

= Eucalyptus haemastoma =

Scribbly gum

Species of eucalyptus

Eucalyptus haemastoma, commonly known as scribbly gum, is a species of tree that is endemic to the Sydney region. It has white or silvery grey bark, lance-shaped or curved adult leaves, flower buds in groups of between nine and fifteen, white flowers and conical or hemispherical fruit. It is one of several eucalypts with prominent and differing insect scribbles in the bark, caused by the larvae of Ogmograptis, (and in the case of E. haemostoma - probably O. racemosa).

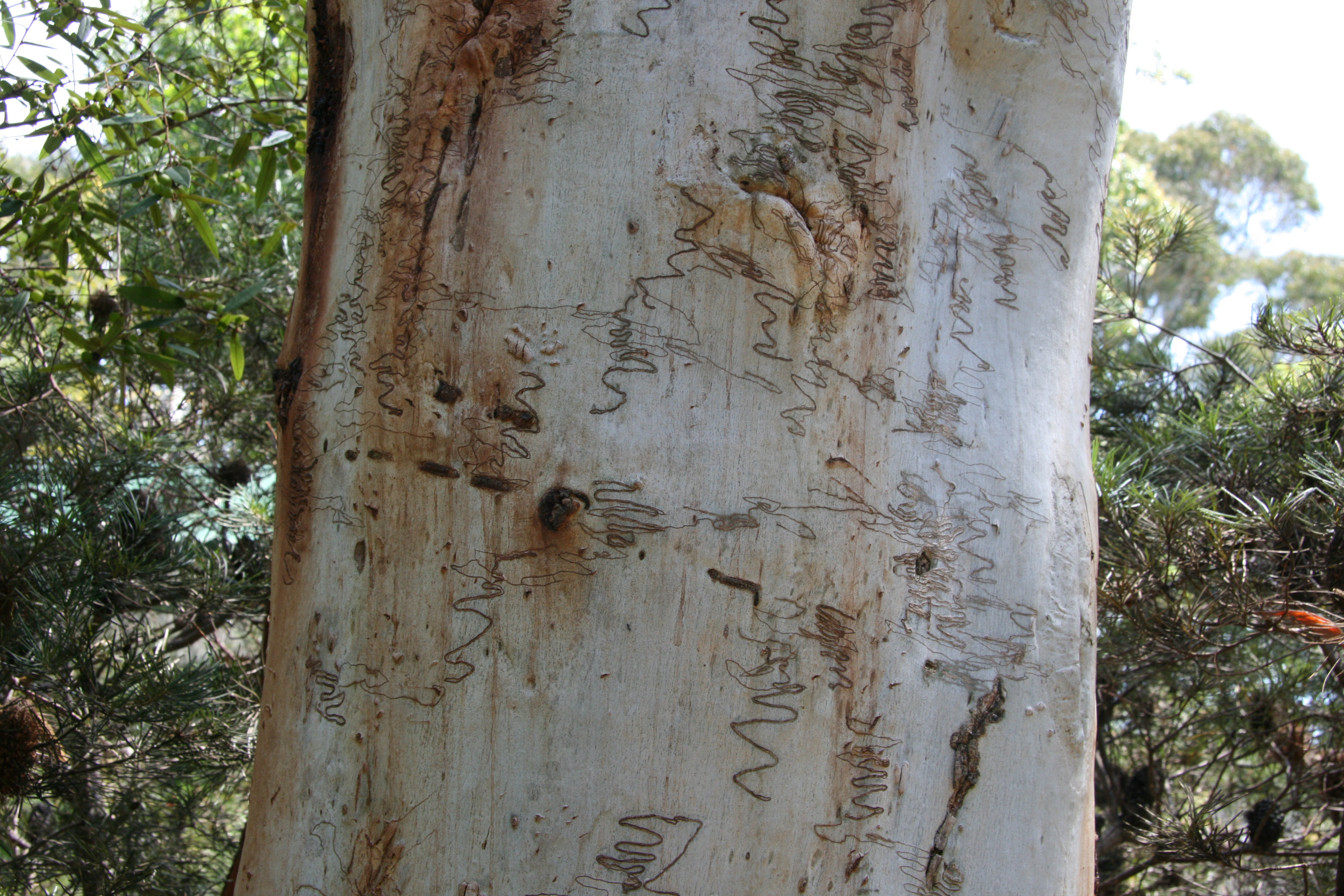
Bark of E. haemastoma at Picnic Point

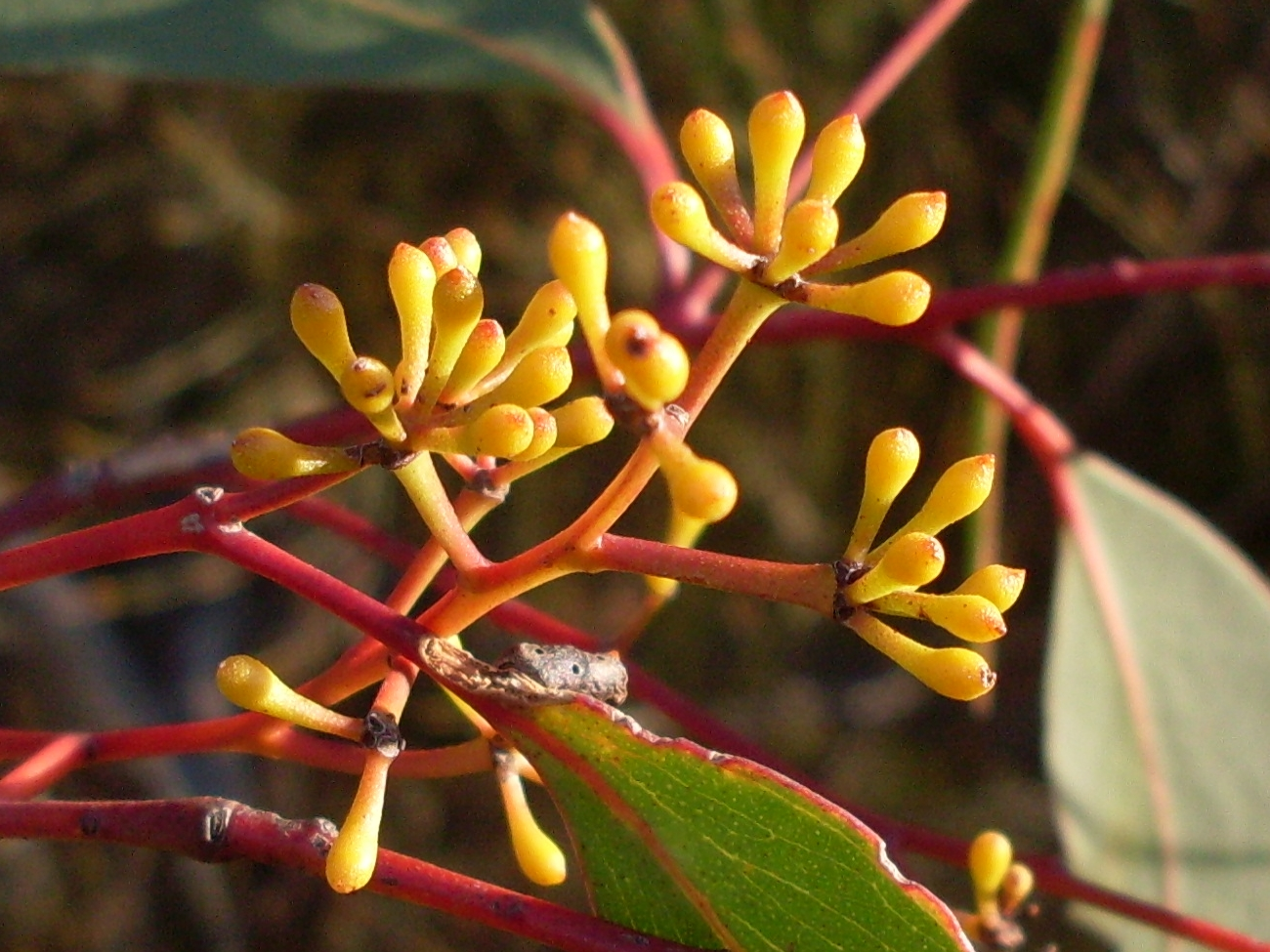
Flower buds

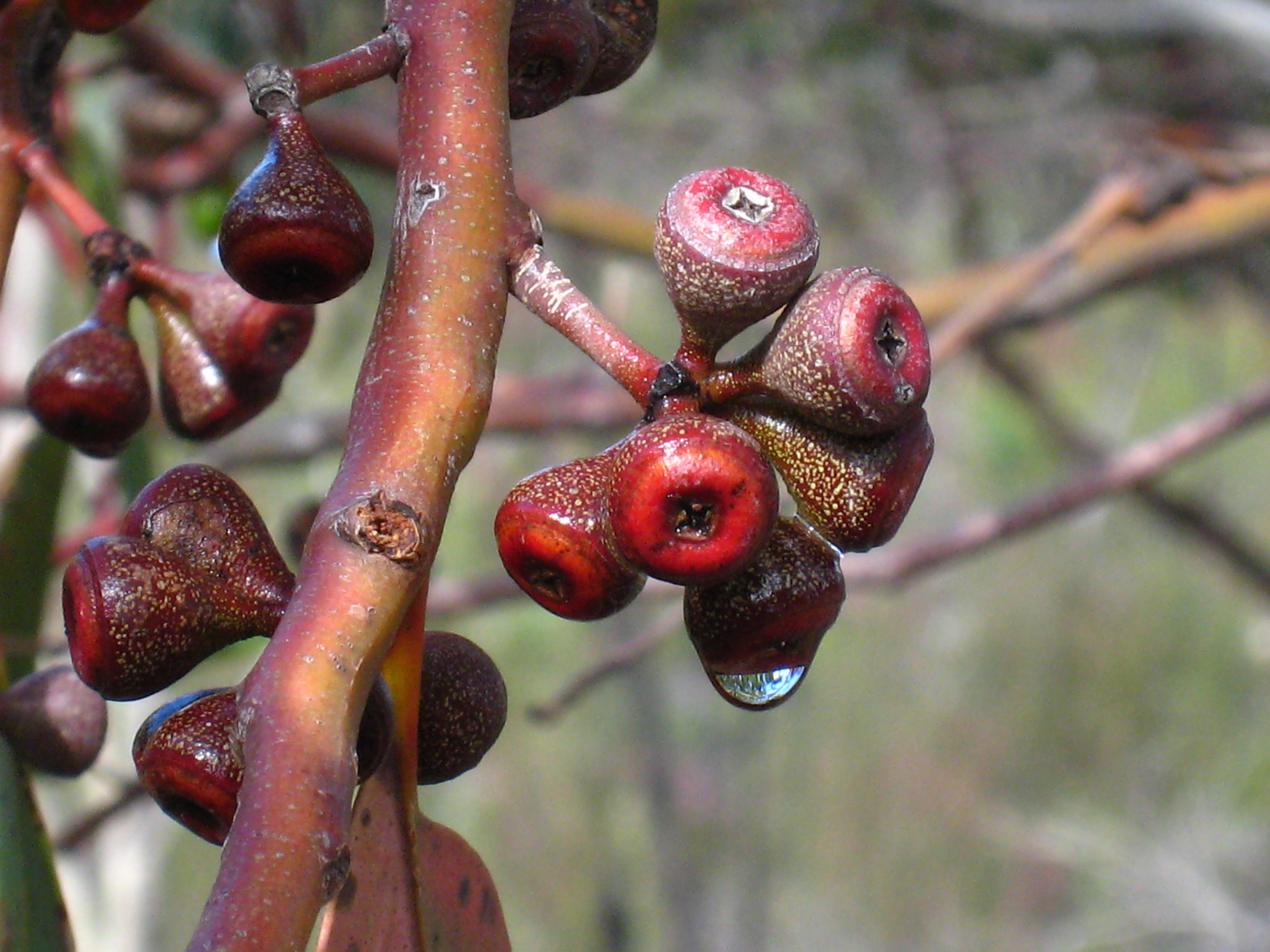
Fruit

== Description ==
Eucalyptus haemastoma is a tree that typically grows to a height of 12–15 m (39–49 ft) and forms a lignotuber. It has smooth white, silvery grey or yellow bark with insect scribbles. Young plants and coppice regrowth have elliptical to oblong or egg-shaped leaves that are 70–150 mm (2.8–5.9 in) long and 20–60 mm (0.79–2.36 in) wide. Adult leaves are lance-shaped or curved, the same shade of green on both sides, 90–210 mm (3.5–8.3 in) long and 15–35 mm (0.59–1.38 in) wide on a petiole 12–20 mm (0.47–0.79 in) long. The flower buds are arranged in leaf axils in groups of between nine and fifteen on an unbranched peduncle 5–25 mm (0.20–0.98 in) long, the individual buds on pedicels 3–7 mm (0.12–0.28 in) long. Mature buds are oval, 4–6 mm (0.16–0.24 in) long and 3–4 mm (0.12–0.16 in) wide with a conical to rounded operculum. Flowering occurs between July and November and the flowers are white. The fruit is a woody, conical or hemispherical capsule 5–9 mm (0.20–0.35 in) long and 7–11 mm (0.28–0.43 in) wide with the valves near rim level.

This species intergrades with E. racemosa, also a scribbly gum, mainly in the south of the Sydney area. A third scribbly gum, E. rossii is found further inland, on the slopes and tablelands between Tenterfield and Bombala.

== Taxonomy and naming ==
Eucalyptus haemastoma was first formally described in 1797 by James Edward Smith in Transactions of the Linnean Society of London. Smith noted "[f]ruit globose, cut off at the summit, its orifice surrounded by a broad deep-red border". The specific epithet is derived from the Greek haima, 'blood' and stoma, 'mouth', referring to the reddish disc of the fruit.

== Distribution and habitat ==
This scribbly gum grows in woodland on shallow sandy soil derived from sandstone. It occurs in the Sydney region between Lake Macquarie and the Royal National Park.

== See also ==
- List of Eucalyptus species
