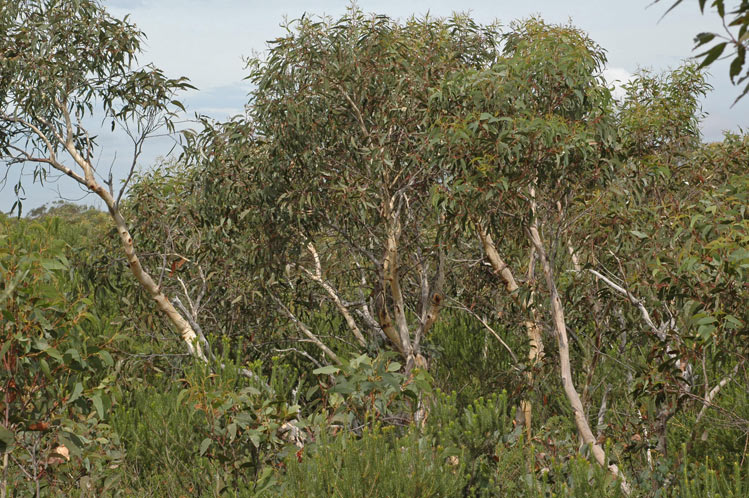
- Eucalyptus racemosa near the Nowra-Braidwood road

Conservation status
- Least Concern (IUCN 3.1)

Scientific classification
- Kingdom: Plantae
- Clade: Embryophytes
- Clade: Tracheophytes
- Clade: Spermatophytes
- Clade: Angiosperms
- Clade: Eudicots
- Clade: Rosids
- Order: Myrtales
- Family: Myrtaceae
- Genus: Eucalyptus
- Species: E. racemosa

Binomial name
- Eucalyptus racemosa Cav.

Synonyms
- Synonyms: Eucalyptus haemastoma subsp. capitata N.Hal nom. inval., nom. nud.; Eucalyptus haemastoma subsp. sclerophylla N.Hall nom. inval., nom. nud.; Eucalyptus haemastoma var. capitata Maiden; Eucalyptus haemastoma var. micrantha (DC.) Benth.; Eucalyptus haemastoma var. sclerophylla Blakely; Eucalyptus micrantha DC.; Eucalyptus micrantha DC. var. micrantha; Eucalyptus micrantha var. signata (F.Muell.) Blakely; Eucalyptus racemosa Cav. subsp. racemosa; Eucalyptus racemosa Cav. var. racemosa; Eucalyptus racemosa var. signata (F.Muell.) R.D.Johnst. & Marryatt; Eucalyptus racemosus Cav. orth. var.; Eucalyptus sclerophylla (Blakely) L.A.S.Johnson & Blaxell; Eucalyptus signata F.Muell.

= Eucalyptus racemosa =

Snappy gum

Species of eucalyptus

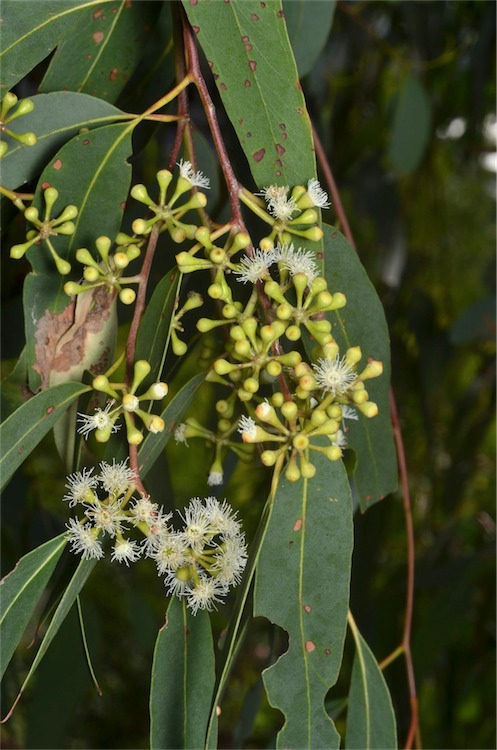
Flower buds and flowers

Eucalyptus racemosa, commonly known as snappy gum or narrow-leaved scribbly gum, is a species of small to medium-sized tree that is endemic to eastern Australia. It has smooth, mottled bark, lance-shaped to curved or egg-shaped adult leaves, flower buds in groups of between seven and fifteen, white flowers and cup-shaped, conical or hemispherical fruit.

== Description ==
Eucalyptus racemosa is a tree that typically grows to a height of 15–20 m (49–66 ft), rarely a mallee, and forms a lignotuber. It has smooth, mottled white, yellow, grey or cream-coloured bark with insect scribbles. Young plants and coppice regrowth have dull green, egg-shaped leaves that are 50–170 mm (2.0–6.7 in) long, 25–85 mm (0.98–3.35 in) wide and petiolate. Adult leaves are the same shade of glossy green on both sides, lance-shaped to curved or egg-shaped, 65–200 mm (2.6–7.9 in) long and 10–35 mm (0.39–1.38 in) wide on a petiole 10–25 mm (0.39–0.98 in) long. The flower buds are usually arranged in leaf axils in groups of between seven and fifteen on an unbranched peduncle 5–25 mm (0.20–0.98 in) long, the individual buds on pedicels 3–6 mm (0.12–0.24 in) long. Mature buds are oval, 3–5 mm (0.12–0.20 in) long and 2–3 mm (0.079–0.118 in) wide with a rounded or conical operculum. Flowering mainly occurs from July to September and the flowers are white. The fruit is a woody, cup-shaped, conical or hemispherical capsule 3–6 mm (0.12–0.24 in) long and 4–7 mm (0.16–0.28 in) wide with the valves near rim level.

== Taxonomy ==
Eucalyptus racemosa was first formally described in 1797 by the botanist Antonio José Cavanilles in his book Icones et Descriptiones Plantarum. The specific epithet (racemosa) is a Latin word meaning "having racemes", which is a misnomer, as it does not have flowers in racemes.

== Distribution and habitat ==
Snappy gum grows in woodland and forest, sometimes in pure stands, on poor sandstone soils in mid to high rainfall areas. It is found along the coast, tablelands and western slopes from Bombala, Bathurst and Albury in New South Wales to Gympie and Bundaberg in south-eastern Queensland.

== Ecology ==
The distinctive scribbles often found on the bark of this eucalypt are caused by the scribbly gum moth, Ogmograptis racemosa.

== Gallery ==
Features of the scribbly gum (Eucalyptus racemosa)

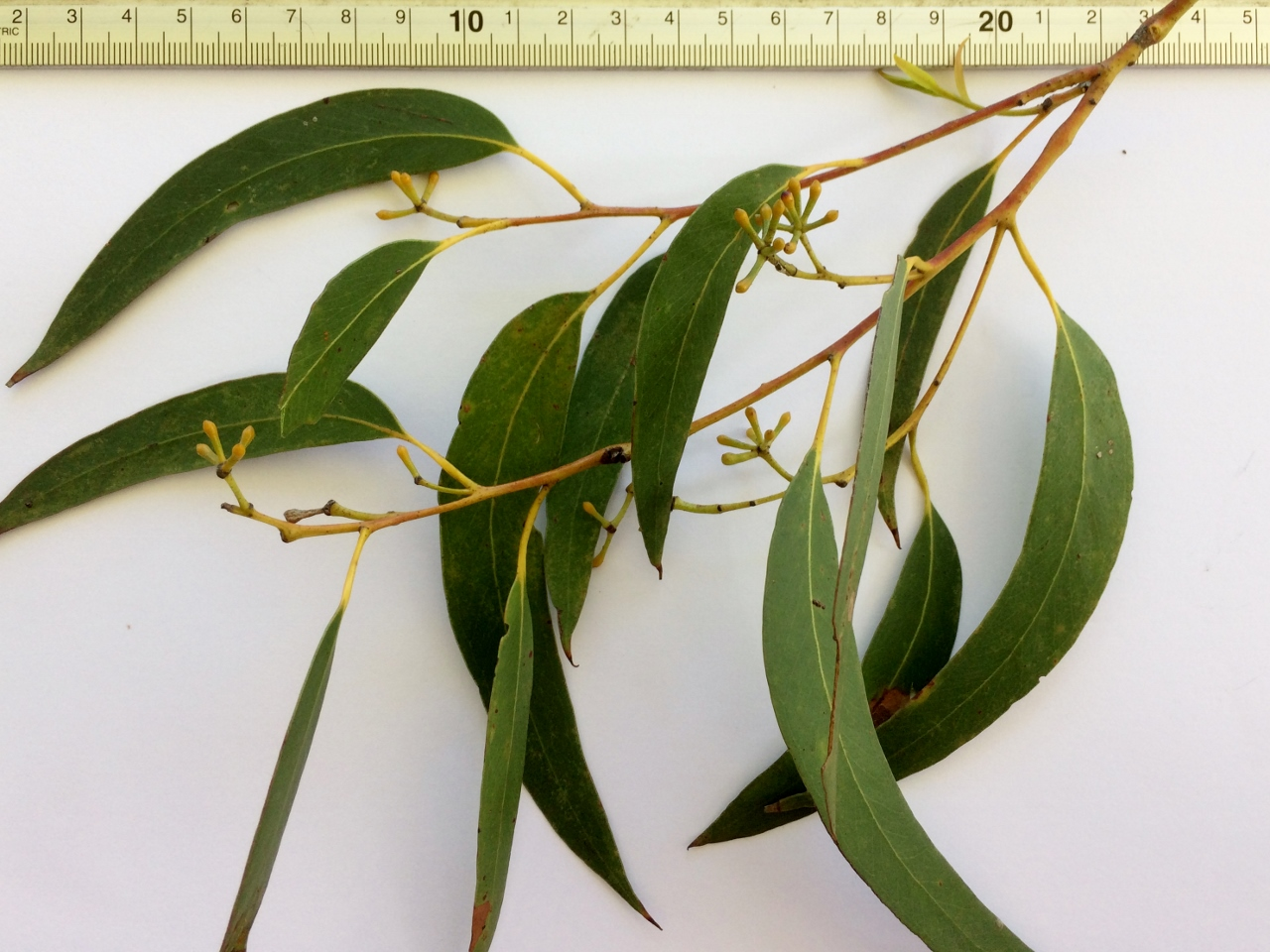
Adult leaves and buds

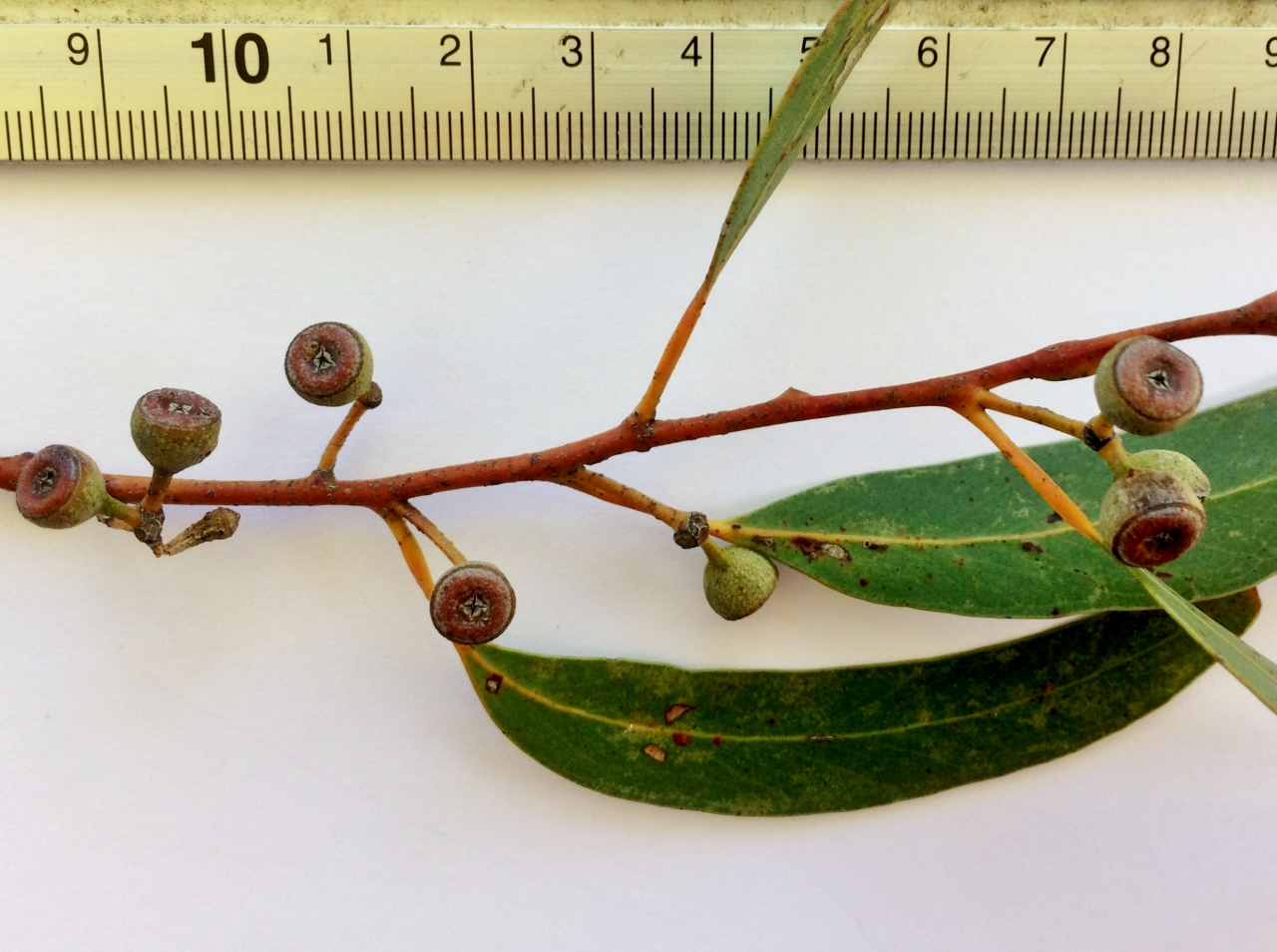
Fruit

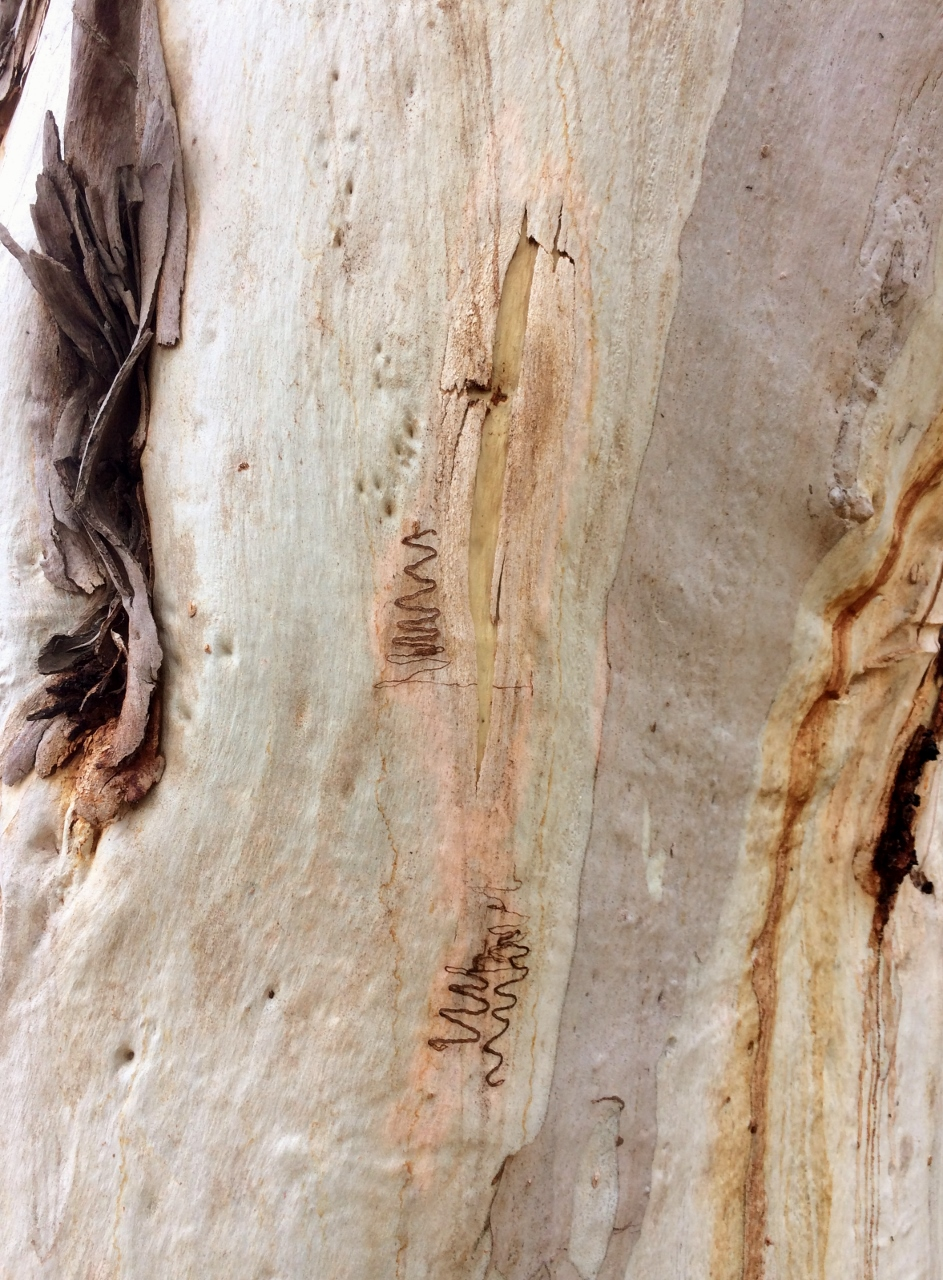
Trunk bark

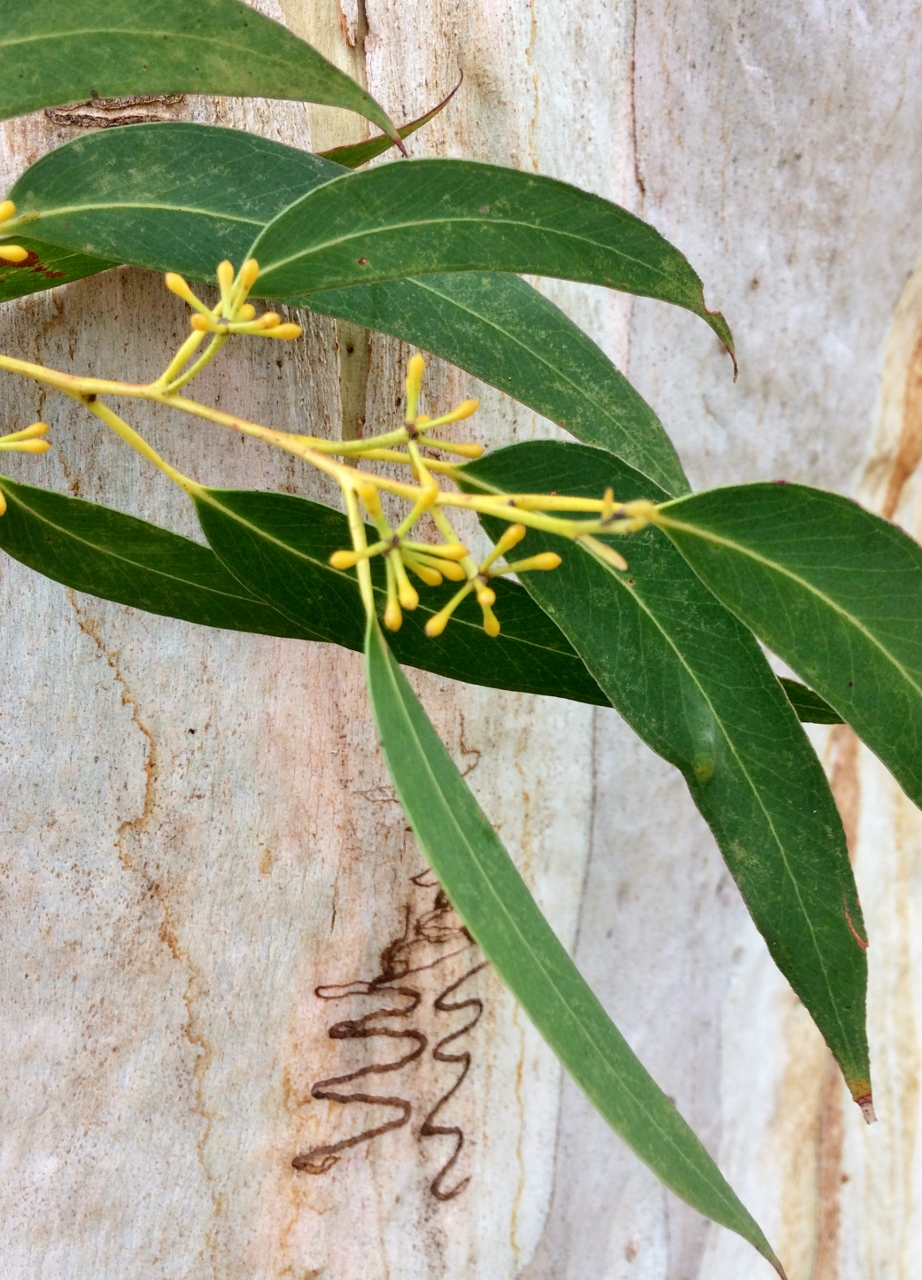
Bark, buds and leaves
