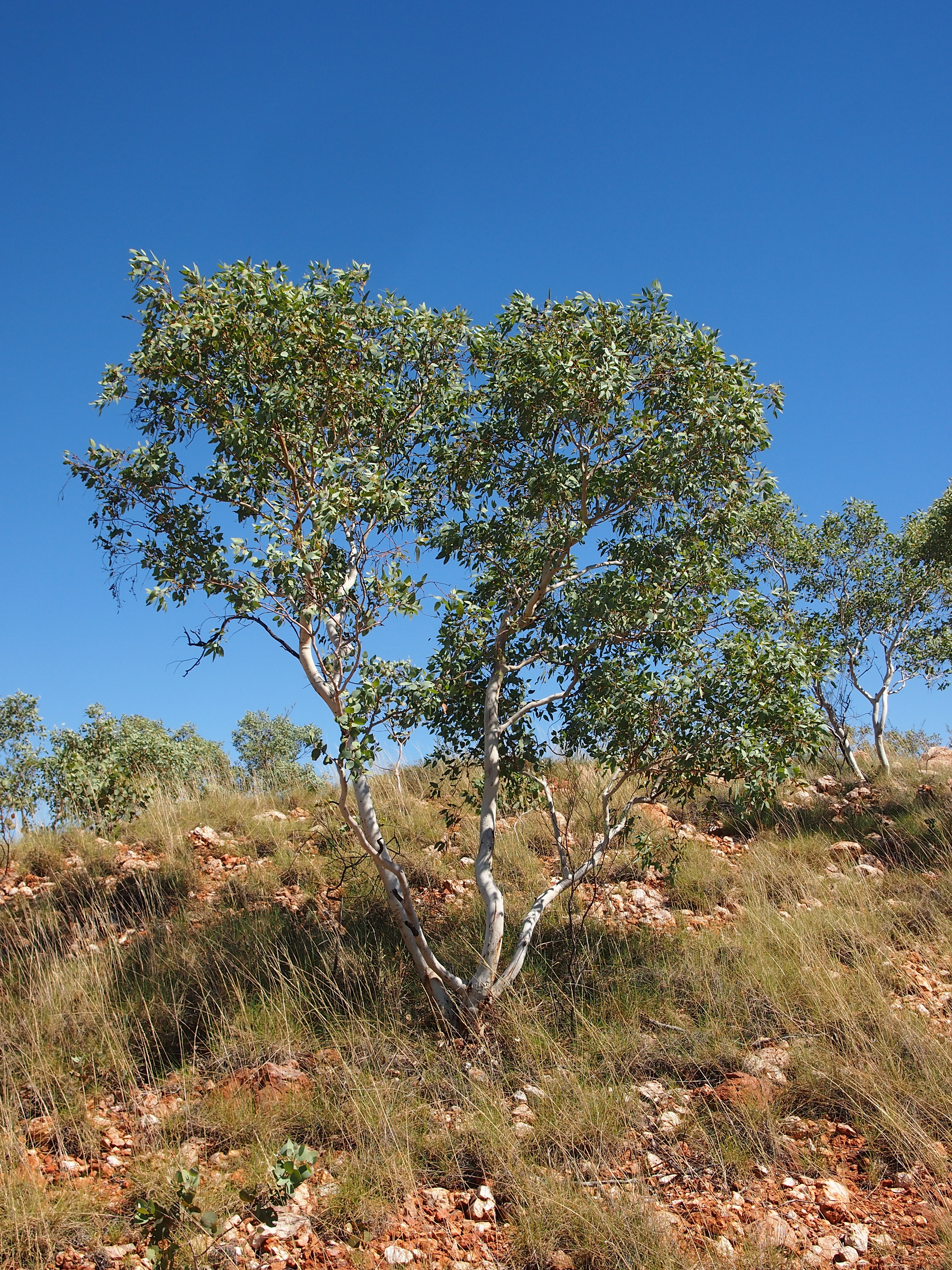

Scientific classification
- Kingdom: Plantae
- Clade: Tracheophytes
- Clade: Angiosperms
- Clade: Eudicots
- Clade: Rosids
- Order: Myrtales
- Family: Myrtaceae
- Genus: Eucalyptus
- Species: E. leucophloia

Binomial name
- Eucalyptus leucophloia Brooker

= Eucalyptus leucophloia =

Snappy gum

Species of eucalyptus

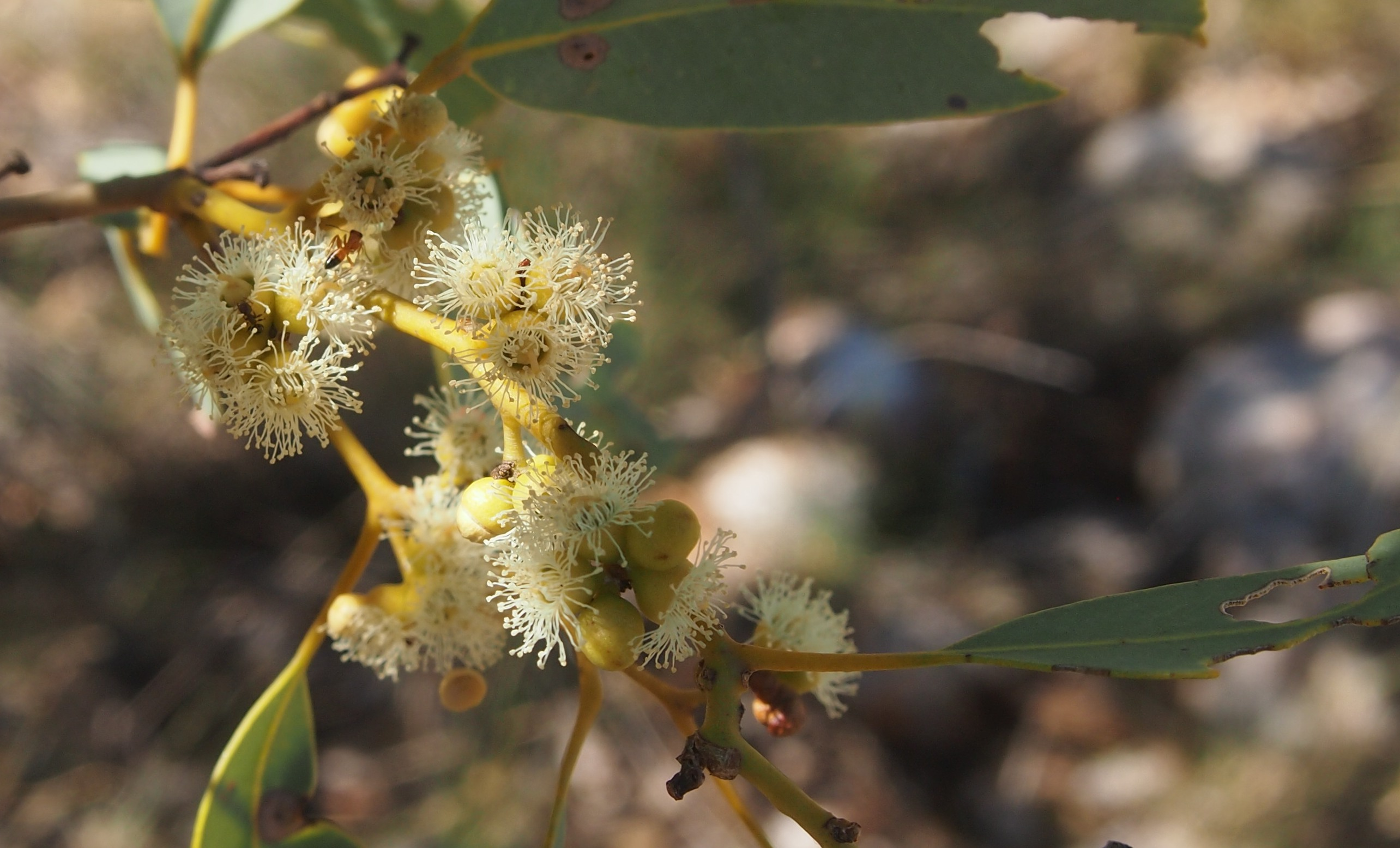
Flowers

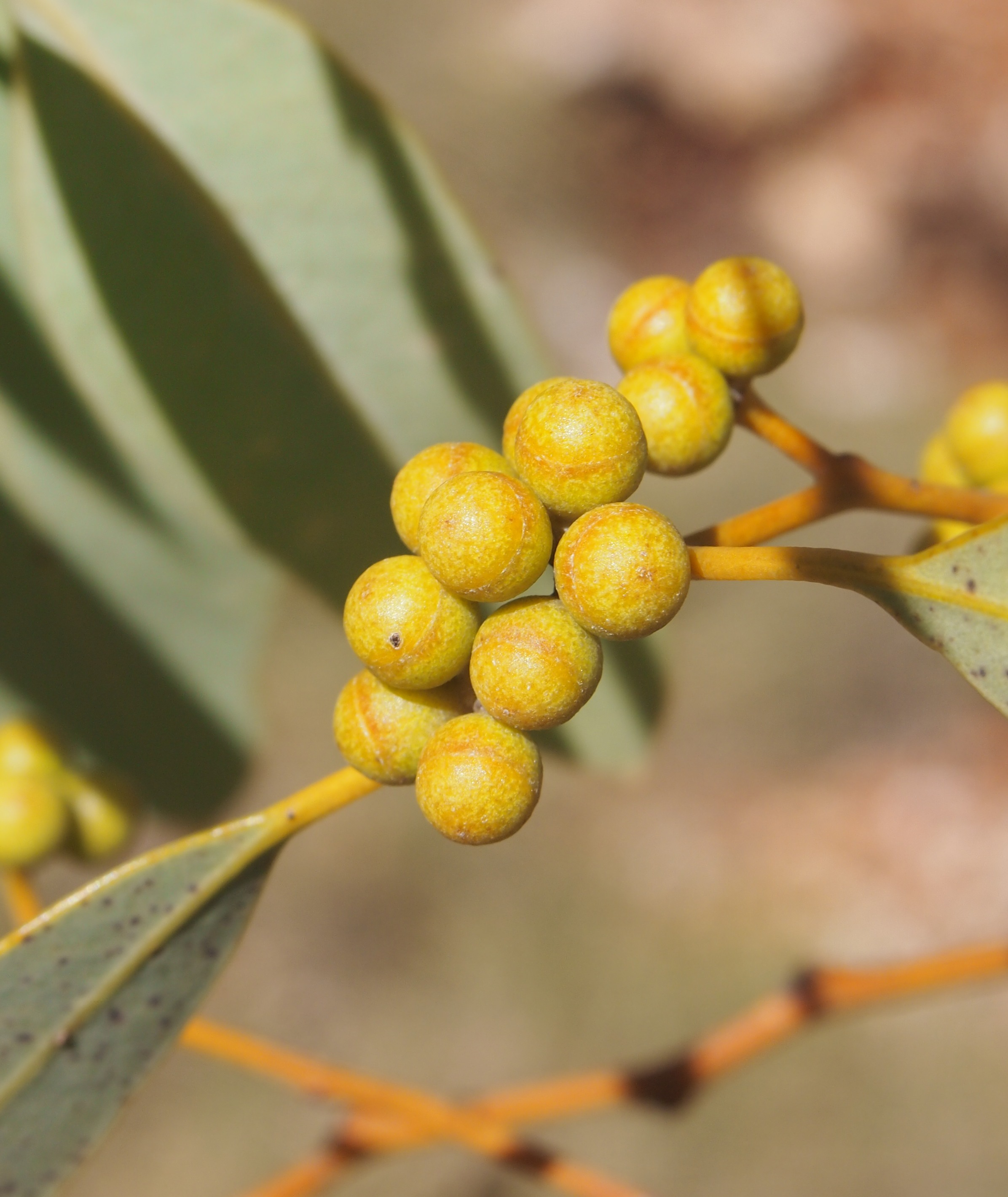
Flower buds

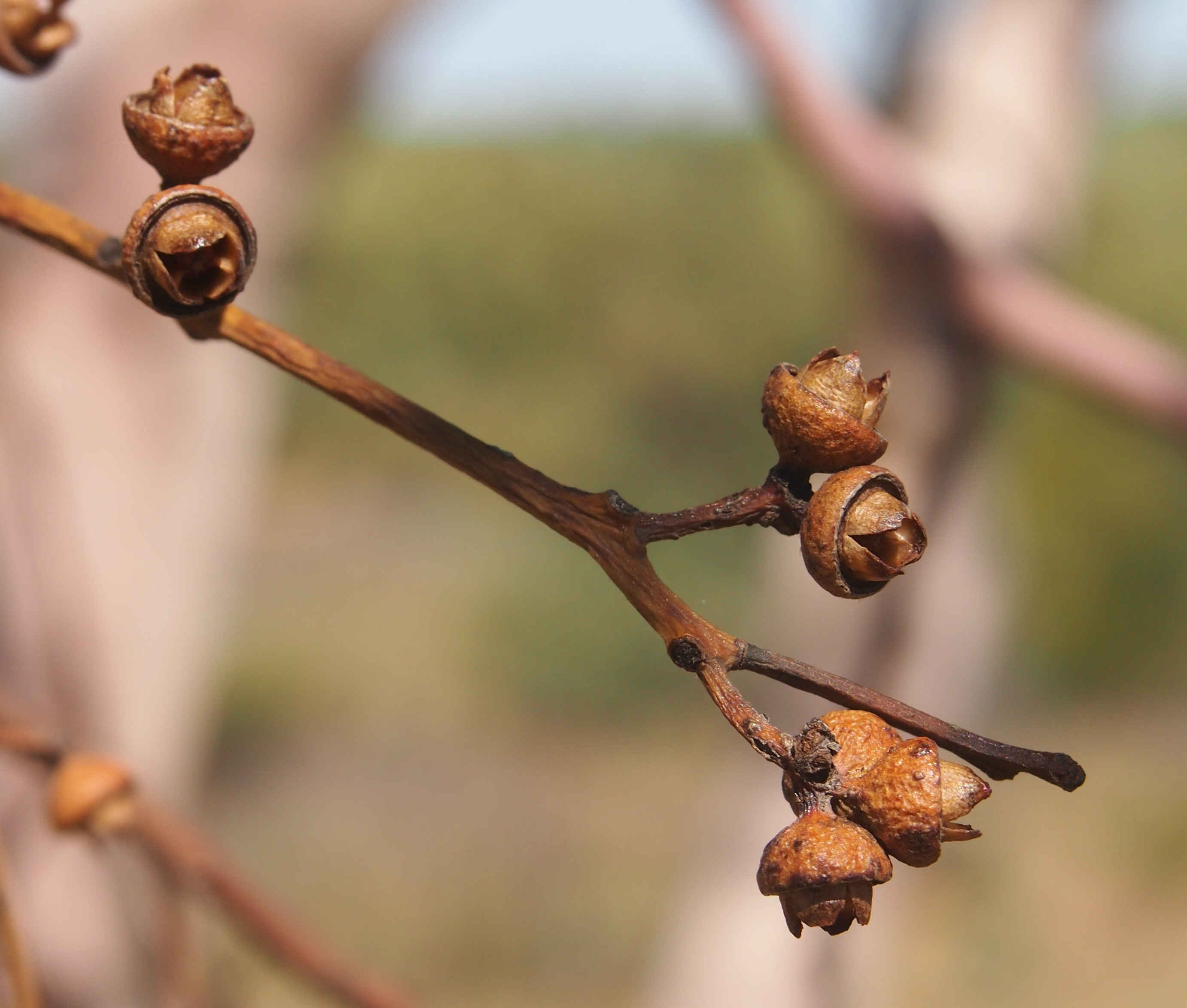
Fruit of subsp. euroa

Eucalyptus leucophloia, commonly known as snappy gum or migum, is a species of small tree or mallee that is endemic to northern Australia. The indigenous Mangarayi and Yangman peoples know the tree as mirndir, the Ngarluma name it as malygan and Yindjibarndi peoples know the tree as majgan. It has smooth, powdery bark, lance-shaped to egg-shaped adult leaves, flower buds usually in groups of seven, white flowers and cup-shaped, barrel-shaped or hemispherical fruit.

== Description ==
Eucalyptus leucophloia is a mallee or small tree that forms a lignotuber. It typically grows to a height of 2.5 to 10 metres (8 to 33 ft). Its new bark is pale pink to pale orange but matures to white and ages in patches to dark pink or grey. The trunk is often crooked and has a base diameter of around 40 cm (16 in). The crown of the tree is usually as wide as the tree is tall and has a moderately dense canopy. Young plants and coppice regrowth have stems that are glaucous, more or less square in cross-section with a wing on each corner, and leaves that are egg-shaped to more or less round, 32–70 mm (1.3–2.8 in) long and 30–85 mm (1.2–3.3 in) wide. Adult leaves are arranged alternately, the same dull green to grey-green colour on both sides, 50–120 mm (2.0–4.7 in) long and 10–40 mm (0.39–1.57 in) wide tapering to a petiole 7–20 mm (0.28–0.79 in) long.

The flower buds are arranged in leaf axils in groups of seven, sometimes up to eleven, on an unbranched peduncle 6–12 mm (0.24–0.47 in) long, the individual buds on pedicels 1–3 mm (0.039–0.118 in) long. Mature buds are oval, 3–7 mm (0.12–0.28 in) long and 3–5 mm (0.12–0.20 in) wide with a rounded, blunt conical or shortly beaked operculum. Flowering occurs between March and August and the flowers are creamy white. The fruit is a woody cup-shaped, barrel-shaped or hemispherical capsule 5–8 mm (0.20–0.31 in) long and 4–6 mm (0.16–0.24 in) wide with the valves enclosed below the rim or prominently protruding, depending on subspecies. The seeds are yellow-brown and round or elliptical.

== Taxonomy ==
Eucalyptus leucophloia was first formally described by the botanist Ian Brooker in 1976 in the paper Six new taxa of Eucalyptus from Western Australia, published in the journal Nuytsia. The type specimen had been collected by Alex George in 1971 from around the Rudall River. The specific epithet (leucophloia) is derived from ancient Greek words (or word elements) meaning "white" and "-barked", in reference to the "strikingly white bark". In 2000, Ken Hill and Brooker described two subspecies and the names have been accepted by the Australian Plant Census:

- Eucalyptus leucophloia subsp. euroa L.A.S.Johnson & K.D.Hill has the valves of the fruit prominently protruding above the rim;
- Eucalyptus leucophloia Brooker subsp. leucophloia has the valves of the fruit enclosed below the rim.

Brooker placed E. leucophloia in Section Brevidoliae with E. rupestris, E. kenneallyi, E. umbrawarrensis, E. confluens, E. brevifolia and E. ordiana.

== Distribution ==
Subspecies leucophloia is found in gullies and on hills and plains in the western Pilbara region of Western Australia where it grows in skeletal soils over sandstone. Subspecies euroa occurs in the central parts of the Northern Territory between Katherine, Tennant Creek and the southern part of Arnhem Land and into north western Queensland between Mount Isa, Cloncurry and Dajarra.

It is found among low woodland communities it will often form pure stands over an understorey of Acacia shrubs and Triodia spinifex grasses. In a mixed woodland is often associated with Eucalyptus gamophylla, Corymbia terminalis and Eucalyptus odontocarpa.

== See also ==
- List of Eucalyptus species
