= Acacia bromilowiana =

Conservation status
- Priority Four — Rare Taxa (DEC)

Scientific classification
- Kingdom: Plantae
- Clade: Tracheophytes
- Clade: Angiosperms
- Clade: Eudicots
- Clade: Rosids
- Order: Fabales
- Family: Fabaceae
- Subfamily: Caesalpinioideae
- Clade: Mimosoid clade
- Genus: Acacia
- Species: A. bromilowiana

Binomial name
- Acacia bromilowiana Maslin
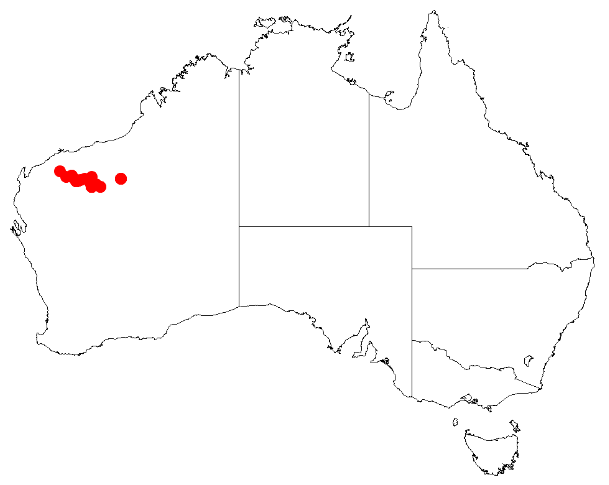
- Occurrence data from AVH

Synonyms
- Acacia sp. (M.E.T. 584); Acacia sp. Pilbara (S.van Leeuwen 5259) WA Herbarium

Species of legume

Acacia bromilowiana, commonly known as Bromilow's wattle, is a species of flowering plant in the family Fabaceae and is endemic to the Pilbara region of Western Australia. It is usually a gnarled, erect tree with lance-shaped to narrowly elliptic phyllodes, pairs of cylindrical heads of light golden yellow flowers, and papery, narrowly oblong pods.

== Description ==
Acacia bromilowiana is usually a gnarled, erect tree that typically grows to a height of 2–5 m (6 ft 7 in – 16 ft 5 in) sometimes to 12 m (39 ft) and a dbh of up to 30 cm (12 in), and has fissured, fibrous grey bark. It usually has a one or two crooked main stems that form branches about 1 m (3 ft 3 in) above ground level, and a dense to domed sprawling crown. The branchlets are reddish and sometimes have a white, powdery bloom. The phyllodes are lance-shaped to narrowly elliptic, mostly 100–140 mm (3.9–5.5 in) long, 20–40 mm (0.79–1.57 in) wide, leathery and glabrous, often reddish and finely wrinkled. The flowers are borne in pairs of racemes 5–15 mm (0.20–0.59 in) long on peduncles 5–15 mm (0.20–0.59 in) long, each spike 25–45 mm (0.98–1.77 in) long with many light golden-yellow flowers. Flowering occurs between July and August and the pods are narrowly oblong, 20–70 mm (0.79–2.76 in) long, 7–10 mm (0.28–0.39 in) wide, yellowish, papery and glabrous, containing brown, egg-shaped seeds 3.5–4.0 mm (0.14–0.16 in) long.

== Taxonomy ==
Acacia bromilowiana was first formally described in 2008 by the botanist Bruce Maslin in the journal Nuytsia from specimens collected in the Hamersley Range in 2006. The specific epithet honours "Robert Neil Bromilow who, as Technical Officer in the Pilbara ...provided excellent field and laboratory assistance over 17 years in the Pilbara".

== Distribution and habitat ==
Bromilow's wattle is native to an area of the Pilbara region of Western Australia and is found in a variety of situations including creek beds, rocky hills, scree slopes, gorges, and breakaways, growing in skeletal stony loam soils that are pebbly to gravelly over laterite, ironstone and basalt. The bulk of the population is situated on the Hamersley Range from around Tom Price through the Ophthalmia Range and on the Hancock Range to around Newman. Another population is found on Balfour Downs Station to the northeast of Newman. It is often found amongst open low eucalypt woodlands communities consisting of Eucalyptus leucophloia and Corymbia hamersleyana over spinifex.

== Conservation status ==
Acacia bromilowiana is listed as "Priority Four" by the Government of Western Australia Department of Biodiversity, Conservation and Attractions, meaning that is rare or near threatened.

== See also ==
- List of Acacia species
