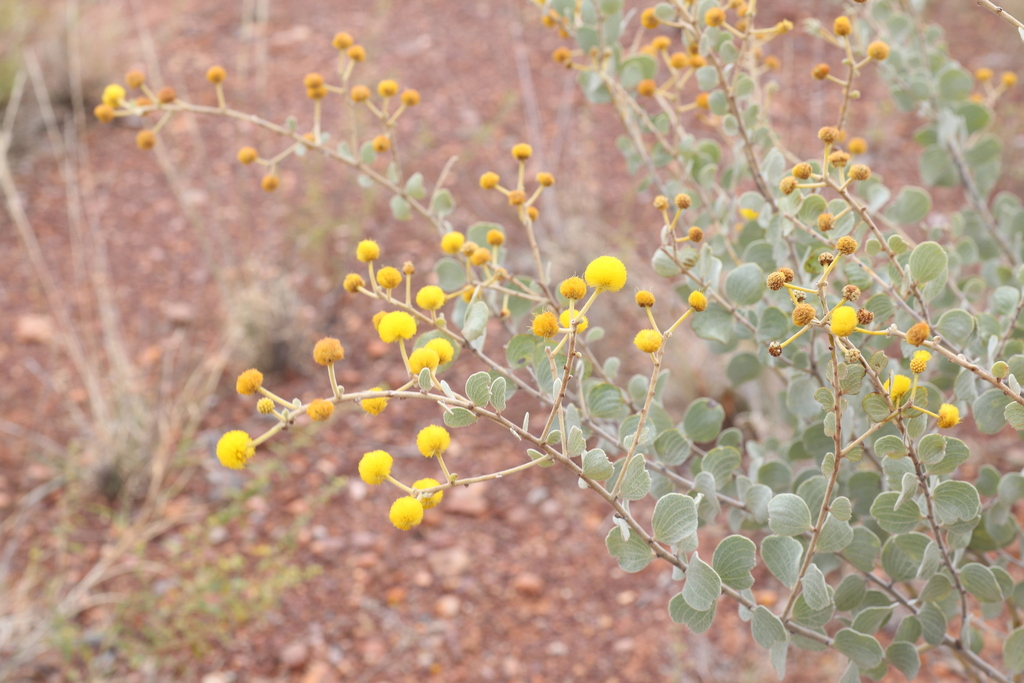

Scientific classification
- Kingdom: Plantae
- Clade: Embryophytes
- Clade: Tracheophytes
- Clade: Spermatophytes
- Clade: Angiosperms
- Clade: Eudicots
- Clade: Rosids
- Order: Fabales
- Family: Fabaceae
- Subfamily: Caesalpinioideae
- Clade: Mimosoid clade
- Genus: Acacia
- Species: A. retivenea

Binomial name
- Acacia retivenea F.Muell.
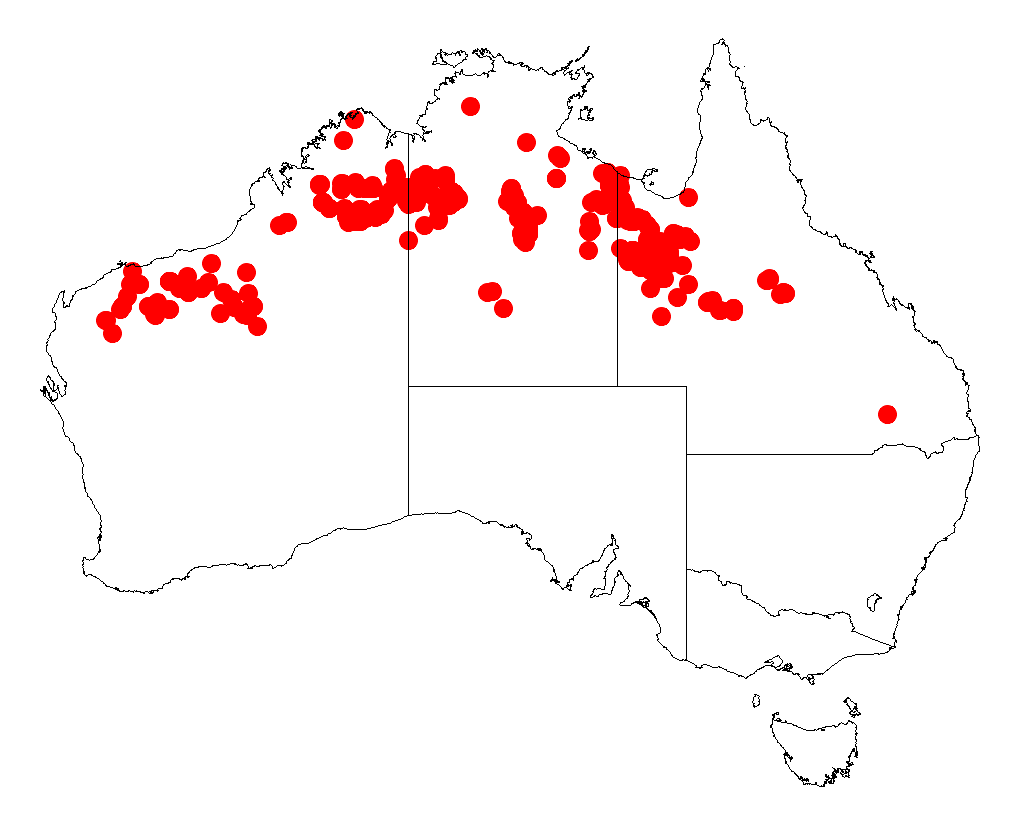
- Occurrence data from AVH

= Acacia retivenea =

Net-veined wattle

Species of legume

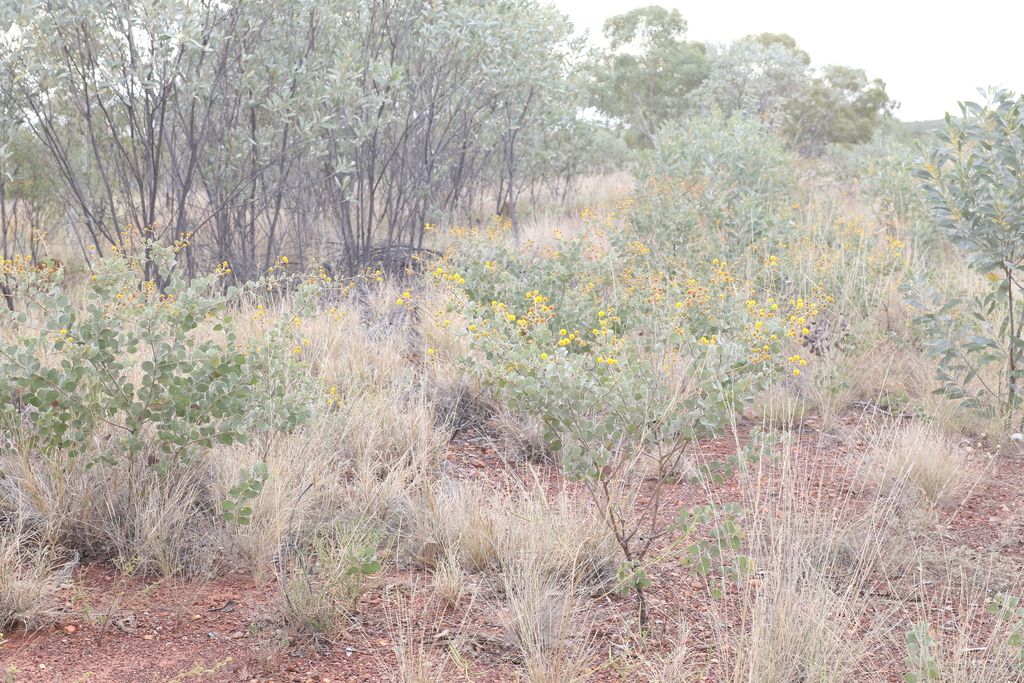
Habit near Three Rivers, Queensland

Acacia retivenea, commonly known as the net-veined wattle, is a shrub of the genus Acacia and the subgenus Plurinerves that is endemic across northern Australia.

== Description ==
The erect open shrub typically grows to a height of 1 to 3 metres (3 to 10 ft). It has branchlets with ovate shape stipules that are basally rounded and about 2 to 3 mm (0.079 to 0.118 in) in length and 1.5 to 2 mm (0.059 to 0.079 in) wide and covered with a dense matting of woolly hairs. Like most species of Acacia it has phyllodes rather than true leaves. The silvery-green phyllodes have a broadly elliptic to subrotund shape with a length of 3.5 to 6.5 cm (1.4 to 2.6 in) and a width of 30 to 60 mm (1.2 to 2.4 in) and usually have five or so main veins with a visible network of minor veins branching off. It blooms from April to October and produces yellow flowers.

== Taxonomy ==
The species was first formally described by the botanist Ferdinand von Mueller in 1863 as part of the work Fragmenta Phytographiae Australiae. It was reclassified as Racosperma retiveneum by Leslie Pedley in 1987 ten transferred back to genus Acacia in 2001. The only other synonym is Acacia retivenia as described by George Bentham in 1863. There are two recognised subspecies:

- Acacia retivenea subsp. clandestina
- Acacia retivenea subsp. retivenea

== Distribution ==
It is native to an area in the Kimberley, Pilbara and northern Goldfields-Esperance regions of Western Australia where it is commonly situated along creek beds, on rocky sites and hillsides growing in sandy or loamy soils. The range of the shrub extends from around Fitzroy Crossing in the south west to around the Wunaamin-Miliwundi Ranges in the northwest extending eastwards into the Northern Territory and across the top end to around Mount Isa in central Queensland with some outlying populations around Pine Creek, Northern Territory and the Reynolds Range in the Northern Territory and Torrens Creek in Queensland. It is usually part of tall shrubland or low open woodland communities and is usually found with Eucalyptus brevifolia and species of Triodia.

== See also ==
- List of Acacia species
