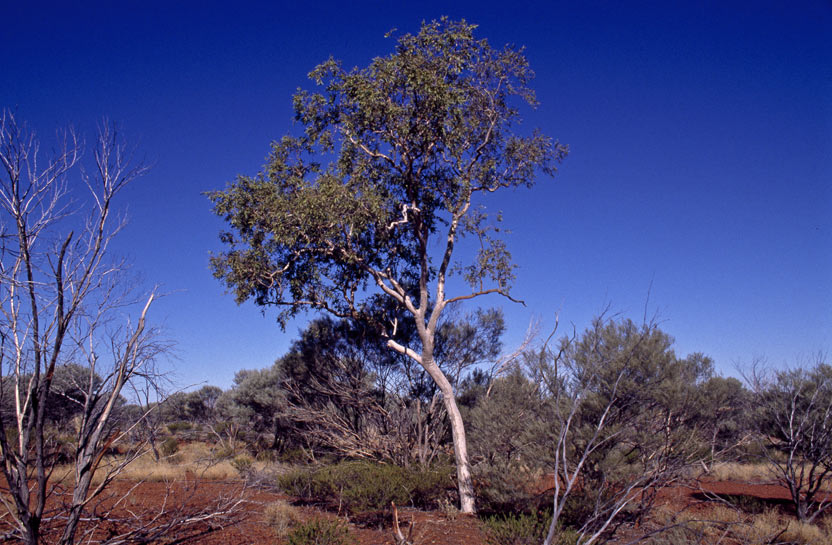
- Corymbia ferriticola in the Gibson Desert

Scientific classification
- Kingdom: Plantae
- Clade: Embryophytes
- Clade: Tracheophytes
- Clade: Spermatophytes
- Clade: Angiosperms
- Clade: Eudicots
- Clade: Rosids
- Order: Myrtales
- Family: Myrtaceae
- Genus: Corymbia
- Species: C. ferriticola

Binomial name
- Corymbia ferriticola (Brooker & Edgecombe) K.D.Hill & L.A.S.Johnson

Synonyms
- Corymbia ferriticola (Brooker & Edgecombe) K.D.Hill & L.A.S.Johnson subsp. ferriticola; Corymbia ferriticola subsp. sitiens K.D.Hill & L.A.S.Johnson; Eucalyptus ferriticola Brooker & Edgecombe

= Corymbia ferriticola =

Pilbara ghost gum

Species of plant

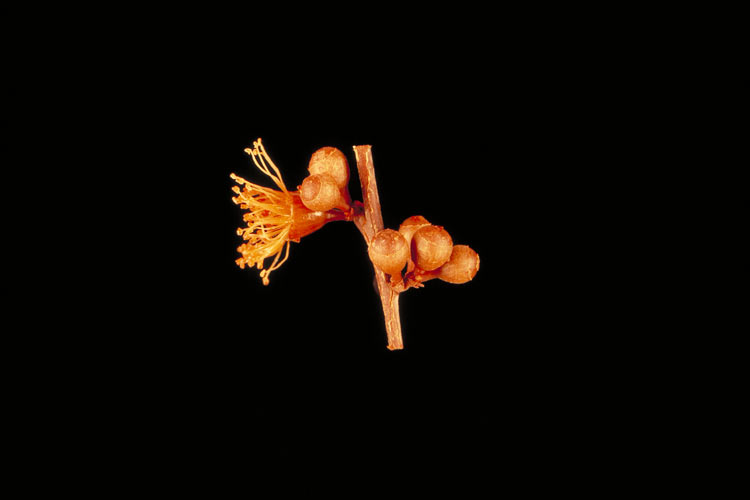
flower buds

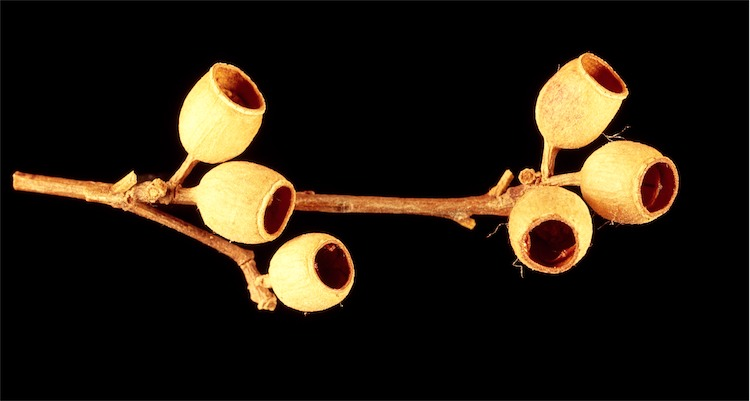
fruit

Corymbia ferriticola, commonly known as Pilbara ghost gum, is a species of tree or a mallee that is endemic to Western Australia. It has smooth bark, lance-shaped adult leaves, flower buds in groups of seven, creamy white flowers and shortened spherical to cylindrical fruit.

== Description ==
Corymbia ferriticola is a straggly tree or mallee that sometimes grows to a height of 15 m (49 ft), often much less, and forms a lignotuber. It has powdery, white to pink bark weathering to light brown, sometimes with rough, grey, tessellated bark at the base. Young plants and coppice regrowth have heart-shaped, egg-shaped or lance-shaped leaves that are 35–80 mm (1.4–3.1 in) long and 13–37 mm (0.51–1.46 in) wide on a short petiole. Adult leaves are arranged alternately, lance-shaped, sometimes wavy, 40–100 mm (1.6–3.9 in) long and 6–22 mm (0.24–0.87 in) wide tapering to a petiole 3–12 mm (0.12–0.47 in) long. The flower buds are arranged in leaf axils on a branched peduncle up to 2 mm (0.079 in) long, each branch of the peduncle with seven buds on pedicels 2–5 mm (0.079–0.197 in) long. Mature buds are pear-shaped, 4–5 mm (0.16–0.20 in) long and 3–4 mm (0.12–0.16 in) wide with a flattened operculum. Flowering has been observed in December and January and the flowers are creamy white. The fruit is a woody shortened spherical to cylindrical capsule 6–10 mm (0.24–0.39 in) long and 4–9 mm (0.16–0.35 in) wide with the valves enclosed in the fruit.

== Taxonomy and naming ==
Pilbara ghost gum was first formally described in 1986 by Ian Brooker and Walter Edgecombe in the journal Nuytsia and was given the name Eucalyptus ferriticola. In 1995 Ken Hill and Lawrie Johnson changed the name to Corymbia ferriticola. The type specimen was collected in 1983 by Brooker and Edgecombe from Wittenoom Gorge. The specific epithet has Latin origins and is in reference to the iron rich habitat of the plant.

== Distribution and habitat ==
Corymbia ferriticola mainly grows on ironstone hills, in gorges and on steep slopes in the Pilbara region, with scattered populations near Mount Augustus, Meekatharra and the Gibson Desert. Although widespread it is distributed sporadically over a range of around 200 km (120 mi) from as far west as Mount Nameless out to east of Newman, Western Australia in the Ophthalmia Range. It is mostly found as isolated trees. The species is often associated with Eucalyptus leucophloia, Eucalyptus pilbarensis Ficus platypoda, Astrotricha hamptonii as well as species of Triodia and Eremophilia.

== Conservation ==
This eucalypt is classified as "not threatened" by the Western Australian Government Department of Parks and Wildlife.

== See also ==
- List of Corymbia species
