= Acacia manipularis =

Conservation status
- Priority One — Poorly Known Taxa (DEC)

Scientific classification
- Kingdom: Plantae
- Clade: Tracheophytes
- Clade: Angiosperms
- Clade: Eudicots
- Clade: Rosids
- Order: Fabales
- Family: Fabaceae
- Subfamily: Caesalpinioideae
- Clade: Mimosoid clade
- Genus: Acacia
- Species: A. manipularis

Binomial name
- Acacia manipularis R.S.Cowan & Maslin

Synonyms
- Acacia sp. B; Acacia sp. B Kimberley Flora; Racosperma manipulare (R.S.Cowan & Maslin) Pedley

Species of legume

Acacia manipularis is a species of flowering plant in the family Fabaceae and is endemic to north-western Australia. It is a spreading, sticky shrub with terete, glabrous, warty, resinous branchlets, thread-like, straight to very slightly curved phyllodes in bundles of two to six, spherical heads of golden yellow flowers, and narrowly lance-shaped, flat, woody pods.

== Description ==
Acacia manipularis is a spreading, sticky shrub that typically grows to a height of 0.75–1.2 m (2 ft 6 in – 3 ft 11 in) and has terete, glabrous, warty branchlets. Its phyllodes are terete, thread-like, straight to very slightly curved, 20–30 mm (0.79–1.18 in) long and about 0.5 mm (0.020 in) in diameter in bundles of two to six. The phyllodes are flexible, glabrous, finely wrinkled when dry, and superficially have no veins. The flowers are borne in a spherical head in axils on a peduncles 20–25 mm (0.79–0.98 in) long, each head 6 mm (0.24 in) in diameter with about 38 golden yellow flowers. Flowering has been recorded in July, and the pods are narrowly lance-shaped, with the narrower end towards the base, flat, straight, up to 55 mm (2.2 in) long, 5–6 mm (0.20–0.24 in) wide, woody and sticky with a thickened margin. The seeds are broadly oblong, 4–5 mm (0.16–0.20 in) lony and glossy with a conical aril on the end.

== Taxonomy ==
Acacia manipularis was first formally described in 1995 by Richard Sumner Cowan and Bruce Maslin in the journal Nuytsia from specimens collected on the Tableland Station in the Kimberley region by Michael Lazarides. The specific epithet (manipularis) means 'resembling a bundle', referring to the clusters of phyllodes.

== Distribution and habitat ==
This species of wattle grows with Melaleuca species and Eucalyptus brevifolia in tall shrubland and shrub, and sometimes on a shale plateau. It occurs near Jasper Gorge in the Ord Victoria Plain in Northern Territory, and there is a disjunct population on the Mount House and Tableland Stations in the Kimberley region of Western Australia.

== Conservation status ==
Acacia manipularis is listed as "Priority One" by the Government of Western Australia Department of Biodiversity, Conservation and Attractions, meaning that it is known from only one or a few locations where it is potentially at risk.

== See also ==
- List of Acacia species
