= Acacia pudica =

Scientific classification
- Kingdom: Plantae
- Clade: Embryophytes
- Clade: Tracheophytes
- Clade: Spermatophytes
- Clade: Angiosperms
- Clade: Eudicots
- Clade: Rosids
- Order: Fabales
- Family: Fabaceae
- Subfamily: Caesalpinioideae
- Clade: Mimosoid clade
- Genus: Acacia
- Species: A. pudica

Binomial name
- Acacia pudica Pedley

Species of legume

Acacia pudica is a species of flowering plant in the family Fabaceae and is endemic to a small area of Queensland, Australia. It is a shrub with glabrous, egg-shaped to elliptic phyllodes with one side more or less straight and the other convex, spikes of yellow flowers, and oblong, woody pods.

== Description ==
Acacia pudica is a shrub that typically grows to a height of up to 2 m (6 ft 7 in) and has fibrous, dark grey bark and glabrous, ribbed branchlets. Its phyllodes are egg-shaped to elliptic with one edge straight and the other convex or S-shaped, mostly 20–30 mm (0.79–1.18 in) long, 4.5–7.5 mm (0.18–0.30 in) wide. The phyllodes are glabrous with three or four longitudinal veins per millimetre. The flowers are arranged in a moderately dense spike 20–25 mm (0.79–0.98 in) long in upper axils, on a peduncle 8–10 mm (0.31–0.39 in) long. Flowering has been recorded before May, and the pods are oblong, about 30 mm (1.2 in) long and 6–8 mm (0.24–0.31 in) wide with woody valves. The seeds are oblong, 4–6 mm (0.16–0.24 in) long and 1.8–2.2 mm (0.071–0.087 in) wide with a small, cup-shaped aril.

== Taxonomy ==
Acacia pudica was first formally described in 2019 by Leslie Pedley in the journal Austrobaileya from specimens collected in the Burke district 32 km (20 mi) north-north-west of Kajabbi. The specific epithet (pudica) means 'modest' or 'bashful', alluding to the "anonymity of the species".

== Distribution and habitat ==
This species of wattle is only known from the type locality in north-western Queensland, where it grows on siltstone in open woodland of Eucalyptus leucophloia subsp. euroa with an understorey of Triodia species.

== Conservation status ==
Acacia pudica is listed as 'least concern' under the Queensland Nature Conservation Act 1992.

== See also ==
- List of Acacia species
