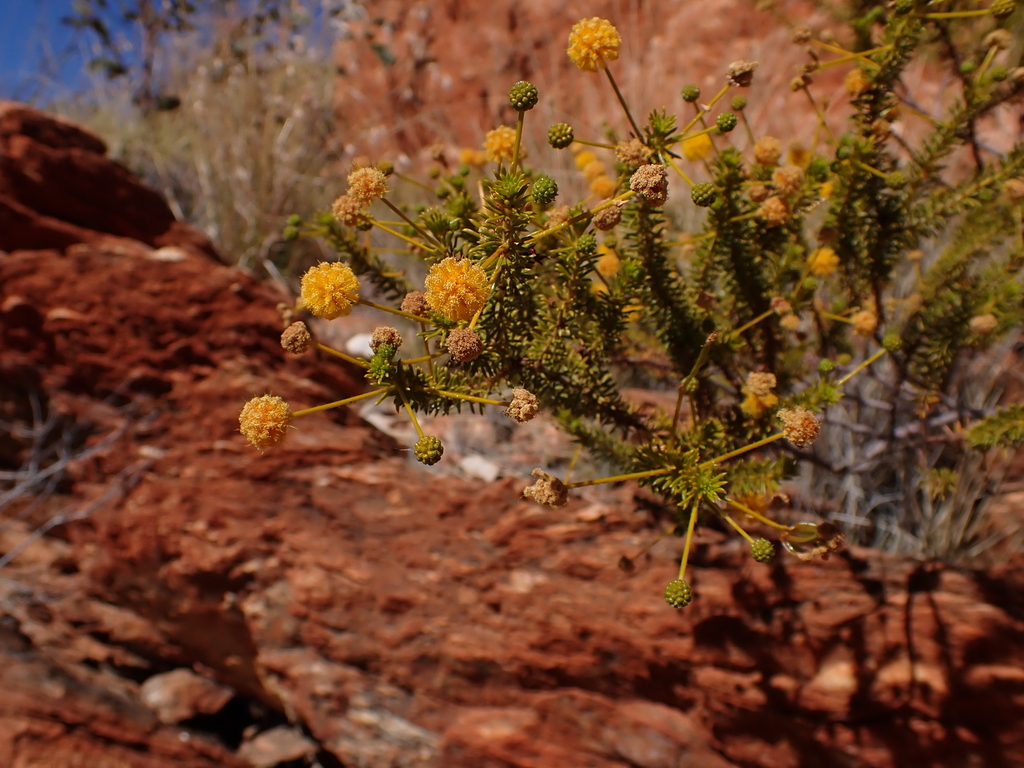
- Near Mount Zeil, in the Northern Territory

Scientific classification
- Kingdom: Plantae
- Clade: Embryophytes
- Clade: Tracheophytes
- Clade: Spermatophytes
- Clade: Angiosperms
- Clade: Eudicots
- Clade: Rosids
- Order: Fabales
- Family: Fabaceae
- Subfamily: Caesalpinioideae
- Clade: Mimosoid clade
- Genus: Acacia
- Species: A. spondylophylla

Binomial name
- Acacia spondylophylla F.Muell.
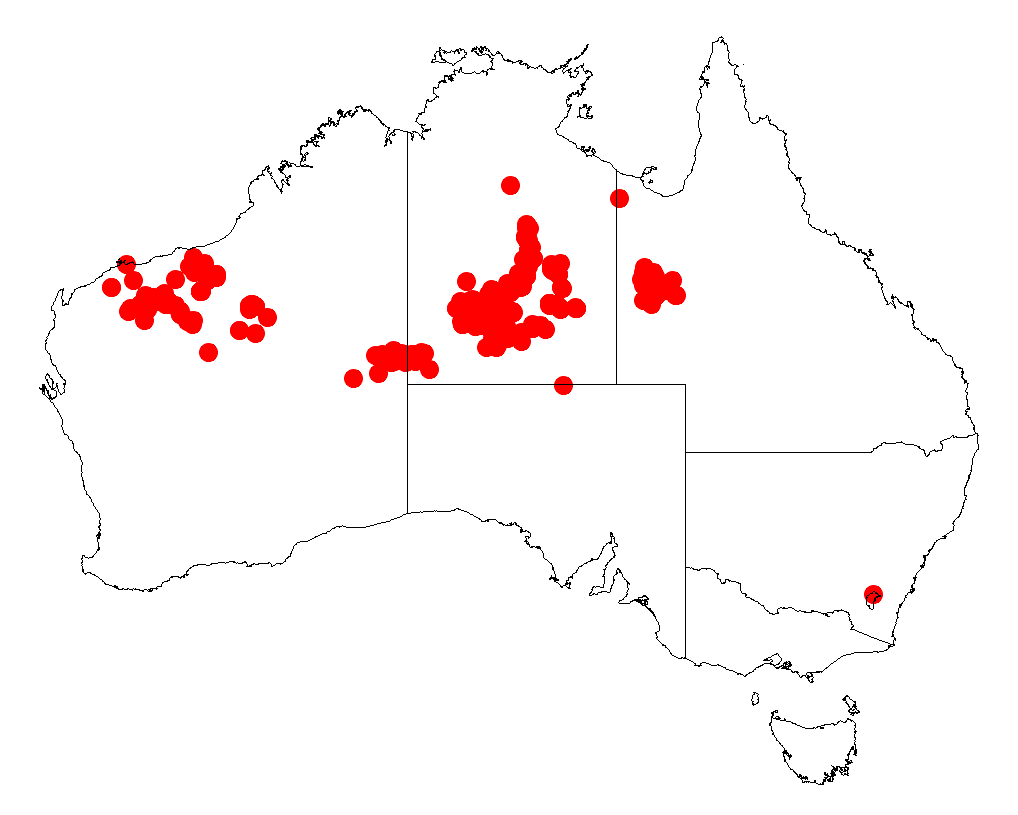
- Occurrence data from AVH

= Acacia spondylophylla =

Curry wattle

Species of legume

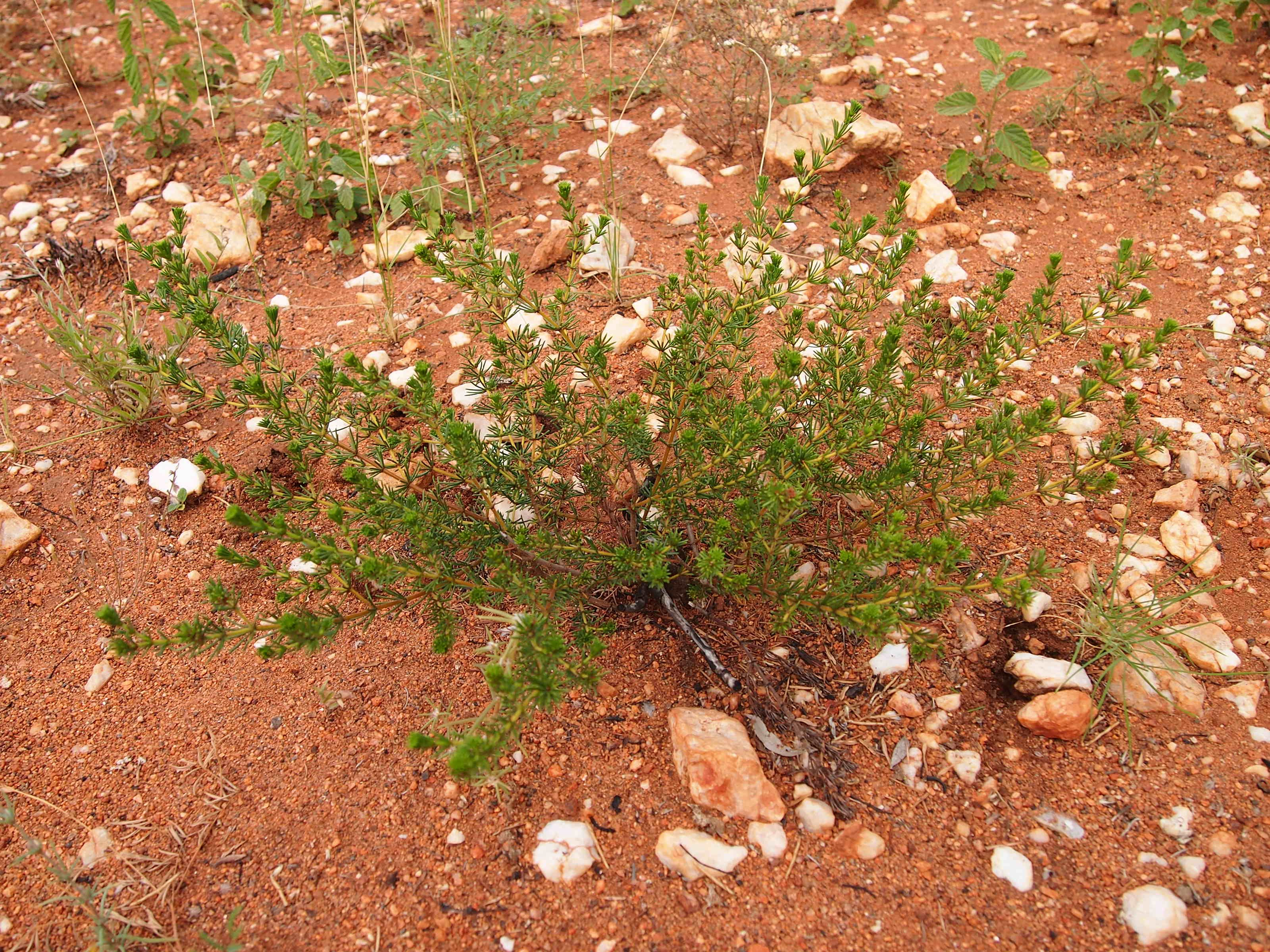
Habit

Acacia spondylophylla, commonly known as curry wattle or spine-leaf wattle, is a small, flat topped shrub native to central and western Australia. The leaves, which are arranged on spaced whorls around the stem, have a distinctive curry-like smell.

== Description ==
The viscid shrub typically grows to a height of 0.3 to 1 m (1 ft 0 in to 3 ft 3 in) but can reach up to 2 m (6 ft 7 in) and has a spreading a flat topped habit. The stems are covered with fine downy hairs and have 1 to 1.5 mm (0.039 to 0.059 in) long stipules. Like most species of Acacia it has phyllodes rather than true leaves. The phyllodes are arranged in whorls of 8 to 14 and are more or less flattened and straight or recurved towards apex. The phyllodes are 6 to 10 mm (0.24 to 0.39 in) in length and less than 1 mm (0.039 in) wide and also covered in fine downy hairs with a single obscure impressed nerve on upper the upper surface. It usually blooms between May and August producing yellow flowers. The spherical flower-heads contain 25 to 40 yellow coloured flowers. After flowering sticky and leathery seed pods form. The linear to curved pods are 20 to 40 mm (0.79 to 1.57 in) in length and 6 to 8 mm (0.24 to 0.31 in) wide and have nerve-like margins and contain transversely arranged seeds with a length of 3.5 to 4 mm (0.14 to 0.16 in).

== Distribution ==
It is found in arid parts of central Australia in Western Australia, the Northern Territory and Queensland. In Western Australia it is found in the Pilbara and northern Goldfields regions where it is usually found along creeks and on rocky hills and gullies growing in stony or sandy soils often around ironstone. It has a disjunct distribution form the Hamersley Range in the Pilabara where it is quite common extending east and becoming scattered from east of the Rawlinson Range in Western Australia. It is then found in the Macdonnell Ranges and Musgrave Ranges in the Northern Territory and then further east to around Dajarra in Queensland.

== Taxonomy ==
The species was first formally described by the botanist Ferdinand von Mueller in 1874 as part of the work Fragmenta Phytographiae Australiae. It is commonly mistaken for Acacia perryi which has larger stipules and phyllodes.

== Cultivation ==
The species is naturally found growing in stony and sandy soils, and has been brought into cultivation for arid area gardening. The shrub is drought tolerant and regenerates easily from seed.

== See also ==
- List of Acacia species
