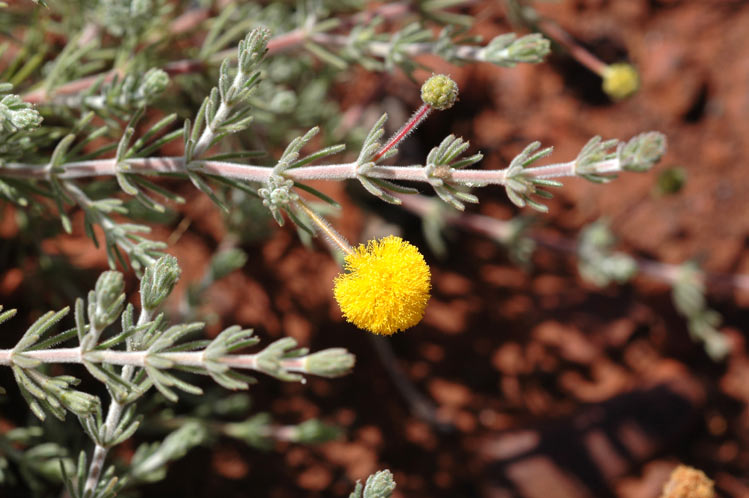
- In Karijini National Park

Scientific classification
- Kingdom: Plantae
- Clade: Tracheophytes
- Clade: Angiosperms
- Clade: Eudicots
- Clade: Rosids
- Order: Fabales
- Family: Fabaceae
- Subfamily: Caesalpinioideae
- Clade: Mimosoid clade
- Genus: Acacia
- Species: A. adoxa

Binomial name
- Acacia adoxa Pedley
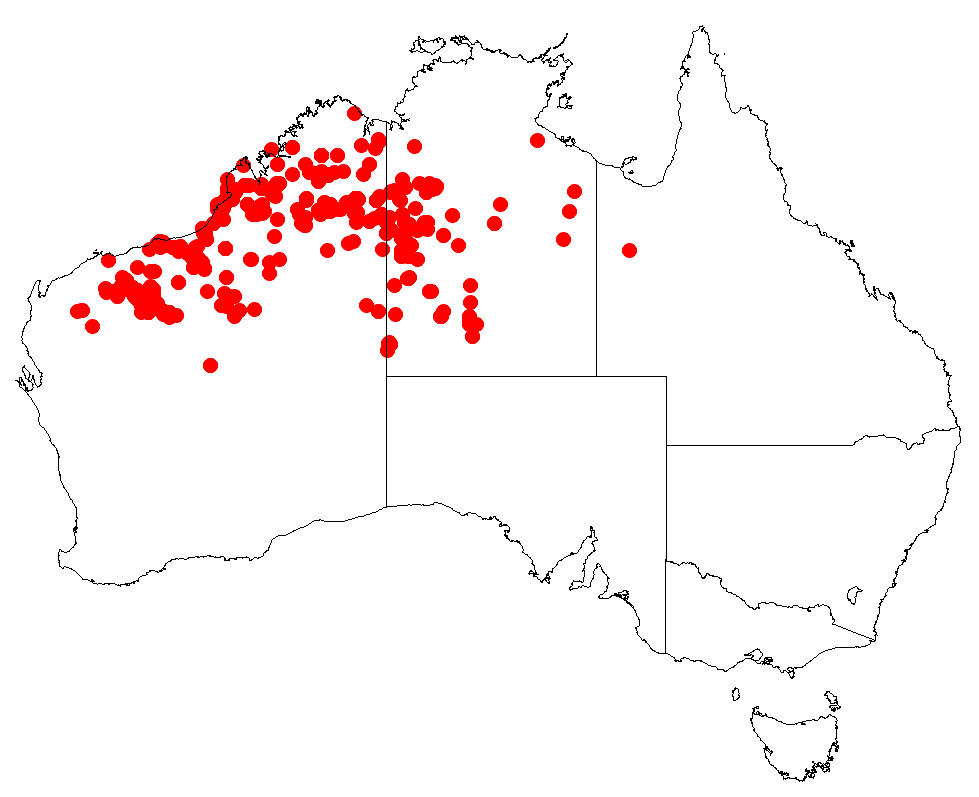
- Occurrence data from AVH

Synonyms
- Racosperma adoxum (Pedley) Pedley

= Acacia adoxa =

Grey whorled wattle

Species of legume

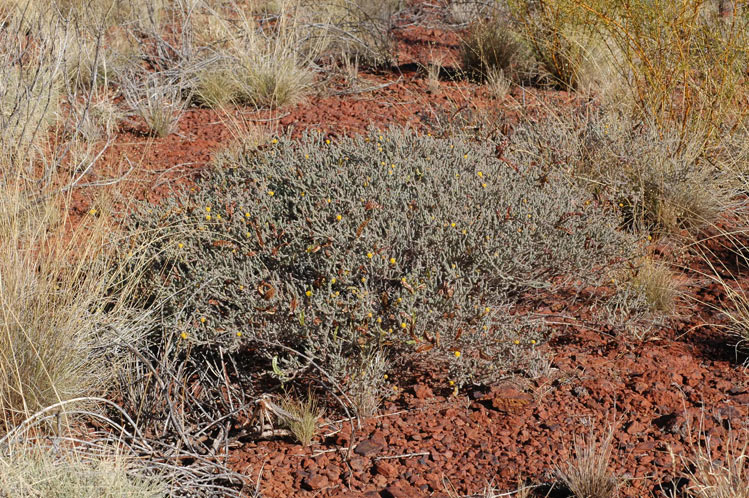
Habit of var. adoxa near Newman

Acacia adoxa, commonly known as the grey-whorled wattle, is a species of flowering plant in the family Fabaceae and is endemic to north-western Australia. It is a dense, low-lying shrub with linear, more or less cylindrical phyllodes in whorls of 6 to 10, heads of golden-yellow flowers, and flat, sticky pods.

== Description ==
Acacia adoxa is a dense, low-lying shrub that typically grows to a height of up to 50 cm (20 in) and about 1 m (3 ft 3 in) in diameter, sometimes to a height of 1.5 m (4 ft 11 in) and sometimes has hairy branchlets. Its phyllodes are arranged in whorls of 6 to 10, and are more or less cylindrical to flattened, mostly 2–5 mm (0.079–0.197 in), sometimes with a small point on the end, and an impressed vein on the lower surface. There is a linear stipule 0.8–1.2 mm (0.031–0.047 in) long at the base of the phyllode.

The flowers are golden-yellow, borne in heads of 25 to 35 on a peduncle mostly 6–15 mm (0.24–0.59 in) long. Flowering occurs from April to October, and the pods are flat, sessile 25–60 mm (0.98–2.36 in) long, 6–7 mm (0.24–0.28 in) wide, glabrous and sticky. The pods contain oblong seeds around 4 mm (0.16 in) long.

== Taxonomy ==
Acacia adoxa was first formally described in 1972 by the botanist Leslie Pedley in Contributions from the Queensland Herbarium from specimens collected in the Northern Territory by George Chippendale. Pedley later reclassified the species in 2003 as Racosperma adoxum but the name was not accepted by the Australian Plant Census.

Two varieties of A. adoxa are accepted by the Australian Plant Census:

- Acacia adoxa Pedley var. adoxa has densely woolly hairy branchlets and softly hairy phyllodes and flowers.
- Acacia adoxa var. subglabra Pedley has more or less glabrous branchlets, phyllodes and flowers.

The name of a hybrid between A. adoxa and Acacia spondylophylla is also accepted.

== Distribution and habitat ==
Grey-whorled wattle is widespread on red sandy soils, sandstone and ironstone gravel, and grows on coastal dunes, stony plains and ridges. In Western Australia it is found in the Central Kimberley, Dampierland, Gascoyne, Great Sandy Desert, Little Sandy Desert, Northern Kimberley, Ord Victoria Plain, Pilbara and Tanami IBRA bioregions. It is also found in the central western parts of the Northern Territory.

== See also ==
- List of Acacia species
