= Acacia perryi =

Scientific classification
- Kingdom: Plantae
- Clade: Tracheophytes
- Clade: Angiosperms
- Clade: Eudicots
- Clade: Rosids
- Order: Fabales
- Family: Fabaceae
- Subfamily: Caesalpinioideae
- Clade: Mimosoid clade
- Genus: Acacia
- Species: A. perryi

Binomial name
- Acacia perryi Pedley
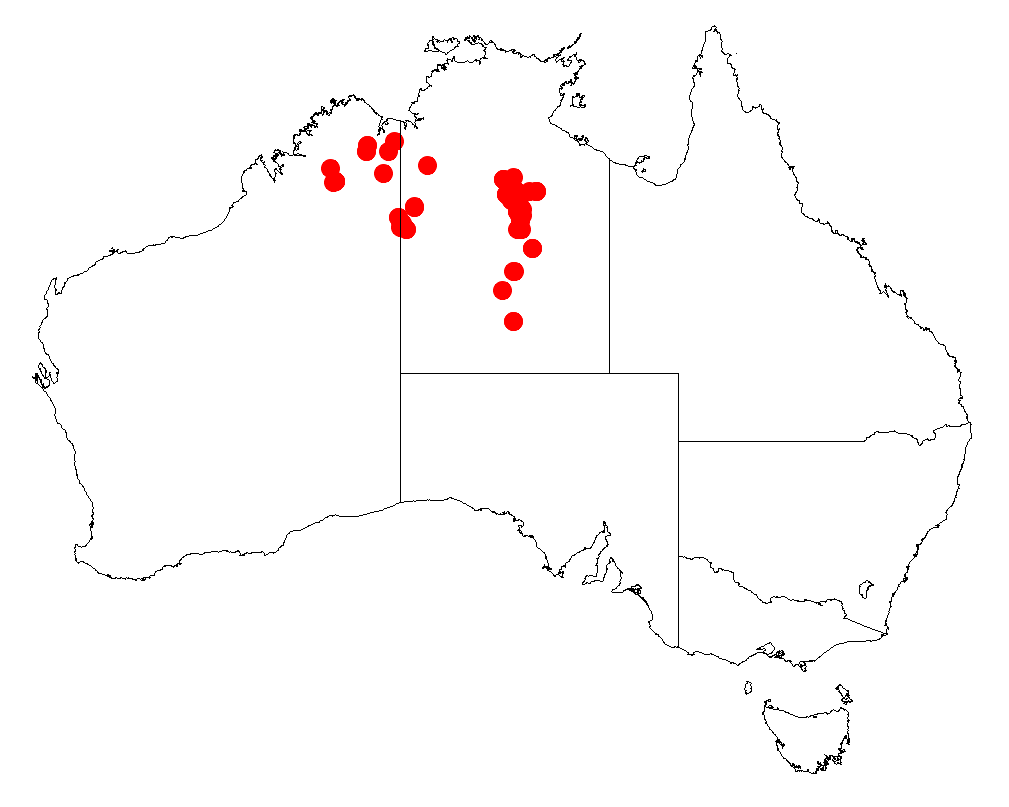
- Occurrence data from AVH

Species of legume

Acacia perryi is a shrub belonging to the genus Acacia and the subgenus Lycopodiifoliae. It is native to an area in the Northern Territory and the Kimberley region of Western Australia.

The viscid shrub typically grows to 1.5 metres (5 ft) and produces yellow flowers.

== See also ==
- List of Acacia species
