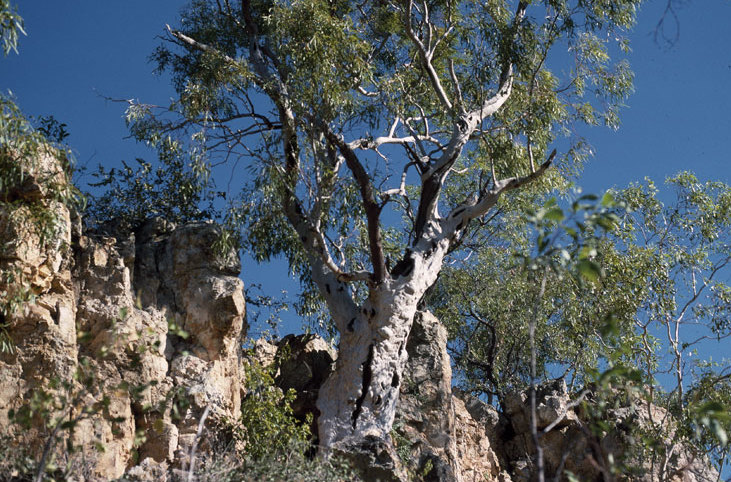
- Eucalyptus umbrawarrensis in Umbrawarra Gorge

Scientific classification
- Kingdom: Plantae
- Clade: Tracheophytes
- Clade: Angiosperms
- Clade: Eudicots
- Clade: Rosids
- Order: Myrtales
- Family: Myrtaceae
- Genus: Eucalyptus
- Species: E. umbrawarrensis

Binomial name
- Eucalyptus umbrawarrensis Maiden

= Eucalyptus umbrawarrensis =

Umbrawarra gum

Species of eucalyptus

Eucalyptus umbrawarrensis, commonly known as the Umbrawarra gum, is a small to medium-sized tree that is endemic to the Northern Territory. It has smooth, powdery white bark, narrow lance-shaped adult leaves, flower buds in groups of seven, white flowers and cup-shaped to barrel-shaped fruit.

== Description ==
Eucalyptus umbrawarrensis is a tree that typically grows to a height of 18 m (59 ft) and forms a lignotuber. It has smooth powdery white bark, that is pale yellow to pale pink when new. Young plants and coppice regrowth have egg-shaped leaves that are arranged alternately, 40–100 mm (1.6–3.9 in) long and 30–65 mm (1.2–2.6 in) wide. Adult leaves are the same shade of glossy green on both sides, narrow lance-shaped, 60–120 mm (2.4–4.7 in) long and 6–22 mm (0.24–0.87 in) wide, tapering to a petiole 6–15 mm (0.24–0.59 in) long. The flower buds are arranged in leaf axils on an unbranched peduncle 4–8 mm (0.16–0.31 in) long, the individual buds on pedicels about 2 mm (0.079 in) long. Mature buds are oval to spindle-shaped, 5–8 mm (0.20–0.31 in) long and about 3 mm (0.12 in) wide with a conical to beaked operculum that is about half as long as the floral cup. Flowering has been observed in January and October and the flowers are white. The fruit is a woody cup-shaped to barrel-shaped capsule 3–5 mm (0.12–0.20 in) long and 3–4 mm (0.12–0.16 in) wide with the valves near rim level.

== Taxonomy and naming ==
Eucalyptus umbrawarrensis was first formally described in 1922 by Joseph Maiden in his book, A Critical Revision of the Genus Eucalyptus from specimens collected by Harald Jensen in 1916 in Umbrawarra Gorge. The specific epithet (umbrawarrensis) refers to the type location.

== Distribution and habitat ==
Umbrawarra gum grows in open woodland on ridges, hills and tablelands in the Top End and Victoria River districts of the Northern Territory.

== Conservation status ==
This eucalypt is classified as "least concern" under the Northern Territory Government Territory Parks and Wildlife Conservation Act.

== See also ==
- List of Eucalyptus species
