= Eucalyptus kenneallyi =

Kenneally's white gum

Conservation status
- Data Deficient (IUCN 3.1)

- Priority One — Poorly Known Taxa (DEC)

Scientific classification
- Kingdom: Plantae
- Clade: Tracheophytes
- Clade: Angiosperms
- Clade: Eudicots
- Clade: Rosids
- Order: Myrtales
- Family: Myrtaceae
- Genus: Eucalyptus
- Species: E. kenneallyi

Binomial name
- Eucalyptus kenneallyi K.D.Hill & L.A.S.Johnson

Species of eucalyptus

Eucalyptus kenneallyi, commonly known as Kenneally's white gum, is a species of tree that is endemic to two small islands off the Kimberley coast of Western Australia. It has smooth bark, lance-shaped adult leaves, flower buds in groups of seven, white flowers and cylindrical fruit.

== Description ==
Eucalyptus kenneallyi is a tree that typically grows to a height of 8 m (26 ft) and forms a lignotuber. It has smooth white to brownish bark that is shed in large plates or flakes. The adult leaves are the same shade of green on both sides, lance-shaped, 60–110 mm (2.4–4.3 in) long and 7–20 mm (0.28–0.79 in) wide on a petiole 10–23 mm (0.39–0.91 in) long. The flower buds are arranged in leaf axils, usually in groups of seven, on an unbranched peduncle 3–5 mm (0.12–0.20 in) long, the individual buds on pedicels 1–2 mm (0.039–0.079 in) long. Mature buds are oval to club-shaped, 6–7 mm (0.24–0.28 in) long and about 3 mm (0.12 in) wide with a conical operculum. The flowers are white or cream-coloured and the fruit is a woody, cylindrical capsule 4–5 mm (0.16–0.20 in) long and about 3 mm (0.12 in) wide.

== Taxonomy and naming ==
Eucalyptus kinneallyi was first formally described in 2000 by Ken Hill and Lawrie Johnson from a specimen collected by Kevin Kinneally on Storr Island. The description was published in the journal Telopea. The specific epithet honours Kevin Francis Kenneally.

== Distribution and habitat ==
Kenneally's white gum is only known from Storr and Koolan Islands near the north Kimberley coast, where it grows in thin sandy soils on hard siliceous outcrops.

== Conservation status ==
This eucalypt is classified as "Priority One" by the Government of Western Australia Department of Parks and Wildlife meaning that it is known from only one or a few locations which are potentially at risk.

== See also ==
- List of Eucalyptus species
