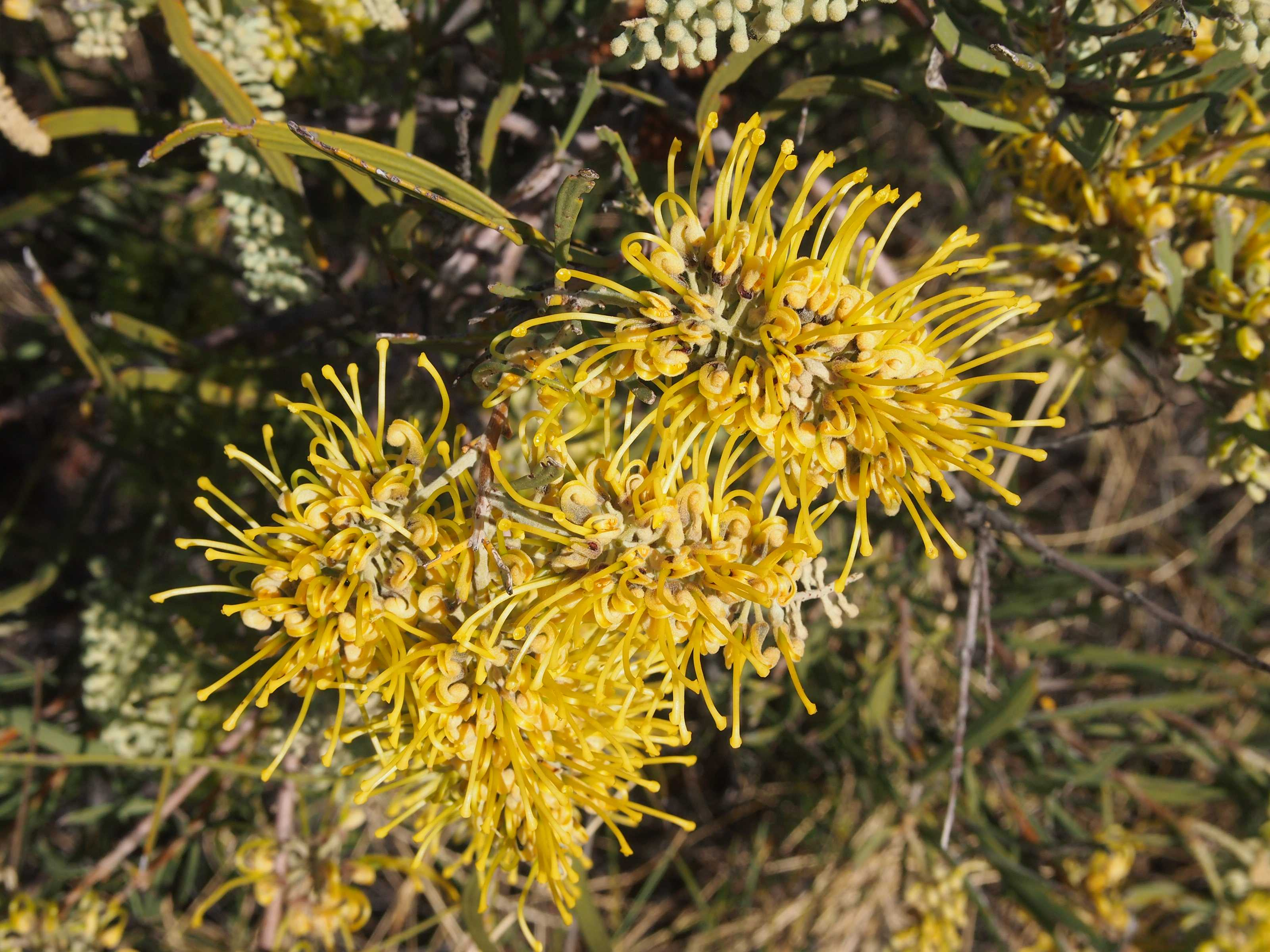

Scientific classification
- Kingdom: Plantae
- Clade: Tracheophytes
- Clade: Angiosperms
- Clade: Eudicots
- Order: Proteales
- Family: Proteaceae
- Genus: Hakea
- Species: H. macrocarpa

Binomial name
- Hakea macrocarpa A.Cunn. ex.R.Br.
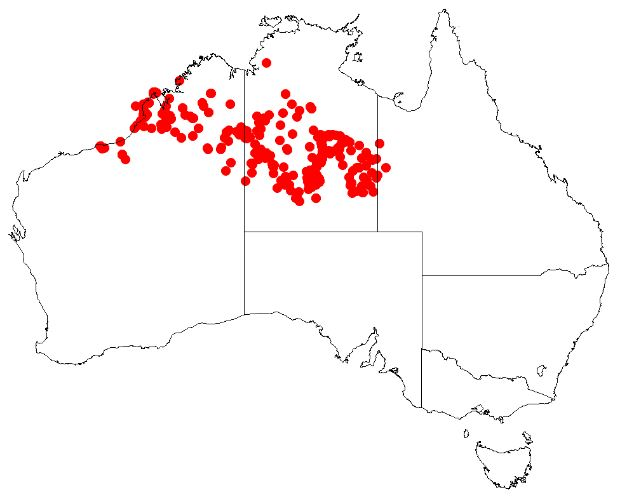
- Occurrence data from AVH

Synonyms
- Grevillea alphonsiana F.Muell.; Hakea morrisoniana W.Fitzg.

= Hakea macrocarpa =

Flat leaved hakea

Species of plant endemic to Western Australia

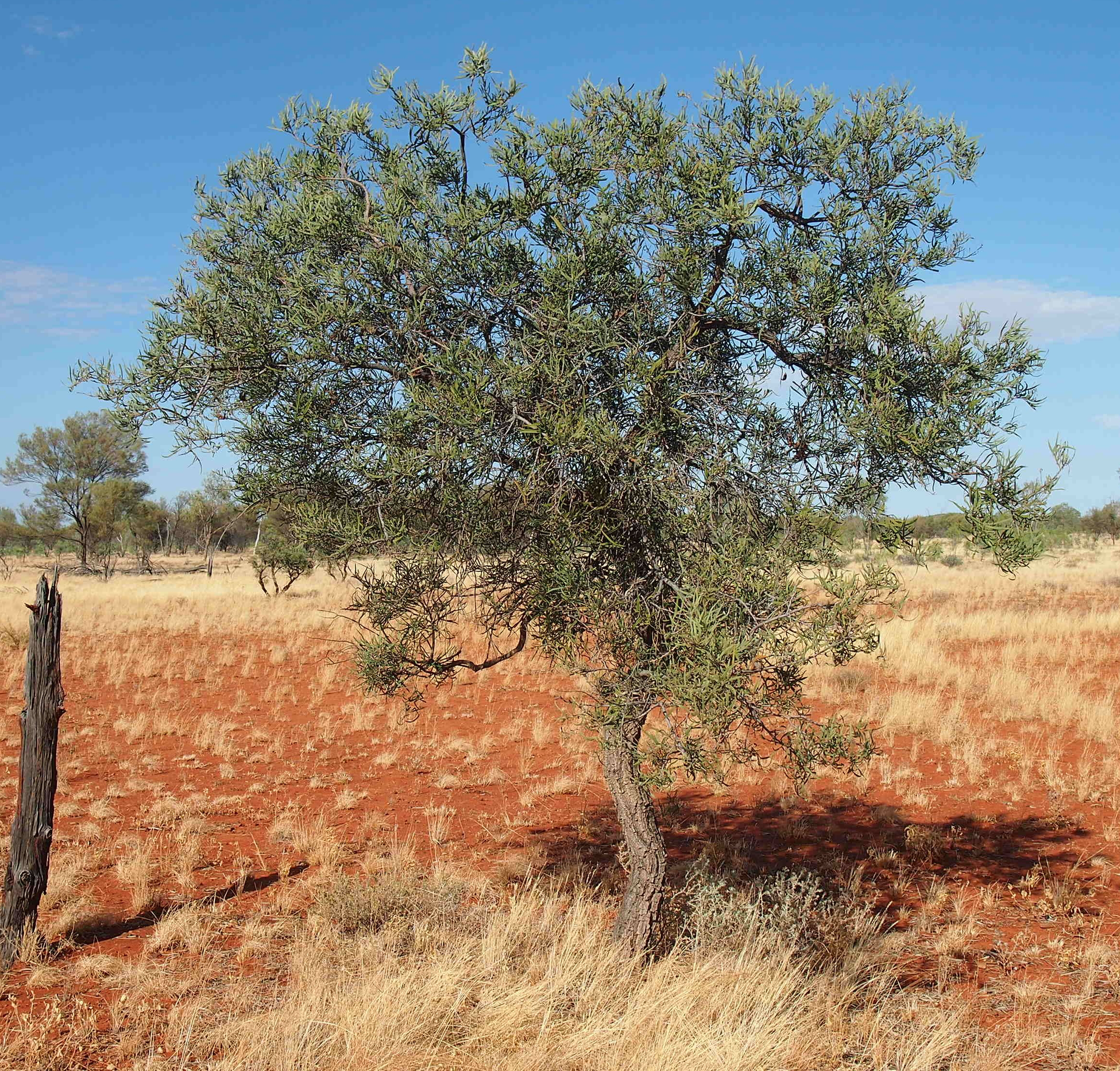
Habit

Hakea macrocarpa, commonly known as flat-leaved hakea, is a species of flowering plant in the family Proteaceae and is endemic to northern Australia. It is a tree or shrub with furrowed bark, woolly-hairy branchlets, narrowly linear leaves and cream-coloured to greenish-yellow flowers.

== Description ==
Hakea macrocarpa is a tree or shrub that typically grows to a height of 1–6 m (3 ft 3 in – 19 ft 8 in) and has furrowed brownish bark and densely woolly-hairy branchlets. The leaves are narrowly linear, 50–350 mm (2.0–13.8 in) long and 3–15 mm (0.12–0.59 in) wide on a petiole is 1–5 mm (0.039–0.197 in) long. The leaves are straight to curved, and densely covered with woolly hairs pressed against the surface at first, later glabrous. Up to 200 flowers are arranged on a floral rachis mostly 60–200 mm (2.4–7.9 in) long, usually with cream-coloured or white woolly hairs pressed against the surface. The flowers are cream-coloured to greenish-yellow, each flower on a pedicel 4–10 mm (0.16–0.39 in) long, the perianth 7–9 mm (0.28–0.35 in) long with a straight or curved style. Flowering mainly occurs from May to August, and the fruit is a follicle 22–40 mm (0.87–1.57 in) long containing a winged seed 18–37 mm (0.71–1.46 in) long and 9–14 mm (0.35–0.55 in) wide with a wing down over half of one side.

== Taxonomy and naming ==
Hakea macrocarpa was first formally described by the botanist Robert Brown in Supplementum primum Prodromi florae Novae Hollandiae. The specific epithet (macrocarpa) means "large-fruited".

== Distribution ==
Flat-leaved hakea grows in red sandy soils on coastal sand dunes, sand dunes, rocky ridges and sandplains in the Central Kimberley, Dampierland, Great Sandy Desert, Northern Kimberley, Ord Victoria Plain, Pilbara, Tanami bioregions of Western Australia, the central Northern Territory and western Queensland.
