= Corymbia hamersleyana =

Scientific classification
- Kingdom: Plantae
- Clade: Embryophytes
- Clade: Tracheophytes
- Clade: Spermatophytes
- Clade: Angiosperms
- Clade: Eudicots
- Clade: Rosids
- Order: Myrtales
- Family: Myrtaceae
- Genus: Corymbia
- Species: C. hamersleyana

Binomial name
- Corymbia hamersleyana (D.J.Carr & S.G.M.Carr) K.D.Hill & L.A.S.Johnson

Synonyms
- Corymbia semiclara K.D.Hill & L.A.S.Johnson; Eucalyptus bynoeana D.J.Carr & S.G.M.Carr; Eucalyptus hamersleyana D.J.Carr & S.G.M.Carr; Eucalyptus hesperis D.J.Carr & S.G.M.Carr; Eucalyptus illustris Brooker MS

Species of plant

Corymbia hamersleyana is a species of small tree or mallee that is endemic to the Pilbara region of Western Australia. It has rough, flaky bark on part or all of the trunk, smooth cream-coloured bark above, lance-shaped adult leaves, flowers buds in groups of seven or nine, creamy white flowers and urn-shaped fruit.

== Description ==
Corymbia hamersleyana is a tree, sometimes a mallee, that typically grows to a height of 8 m (26 ft) and forms a lignotuber. It has thin, rough, flaky or tessellated bark that is shed in small polygonal flakes, on part or all of the trunk, smooth cream-coloured bark above. Young plants and coppice regrowth have stiff, elliptical to egg-shaped or lance-shaped leaves that are 45–105 mm (1.8–4.1 in) long and 12–30 mm (0.47–1.18 in) wide arranged in opposite pairs. Adult leaves are arranged alternately, the same shade of green on both sides, 80–165 mm (3.1–6.5 in) long and 10–20 mm (0.39–0.79 in) wide, tapering to a petiole 10–25 mm (0.39–0.98 in) long. The flower buds are arranged on the ends of branchlets on a branched peduncle 6–13 mm (0.24–0.51 in) long, each branch of the peduncle with seven or nine buds on pedicels 2–8 mm (0.079–0.315 in) long. Mature buds are oval to pear-shaped, 6–8 mm (0.24–0.31 in) long and 5–8 mm (0.20–0.31 in) wide with a rounded operculum that often has a small point in the centre. Flowering occurs between April and September and the flowers are creamy white. The fruit is a woody urn-shaped capsule 11–17 mm (0.43–0.67 in) long and 9–16 mm (0.35–0.63 in) wide with the valves enclosed in the fruit.

== Taxonomy and naming ==
This eucalypt was first formally described in 1987 by Denis Carr and Stella Carr and was given the name Eucalyptus hamersleyana. In 1995 Ken Hill and Lawrie Johnson changed the name to Corymbia hamersleyana. The specific epithet (hamersleyana) honours the pioneering Hamersley family, including Edward Hamersley, in whose honour Francis Thomas Gregory named the Hamersley Range.

== Distribution and habitat ==
Corymbia hamersleyana grows in shallow and skeletal soils on rocky slopes and hillsides throughout the Pilbara and North West Cape regions of Western Australia.

== See also ==
- List of Corymbia species
