= Geography of Western Australia =

- Continent: Australia
- Region: Western Australia
- Coordinates: 26°S 121°E
- Area: Ranked 1st among states and territories
  - Total: 2,527,013 km^{2} (975,685 sq mi)
- Coastline: 12,889 km (8,009 mi)
- Borders: Land borders: Northern Territory, South Australia
- Highest point: Mount Meharry; 1,249 m (4,098 ft)
- Longest river: Gascoyne River; 834 km (518 mi)
- Largest lake: Lake Mackay; 3494 km^{2}

Western Australia occupies nearly one third of the Australian continent. Due to the size and the isolation of the state, considerable emphasis has been made of these features; it is the second largest administrative territory in the world, after Yakutia in Russia, despite the fact that Australia is only the sixth largest country in the world by area, and no other regional administrative jurisdiction in the world occupies such a high percentage of a continental land mass.

Its capital city, Perth, is also considered to be amongst the world's most isolated, being closer to Jakarta in Indonesia, than to the Australian national capital in Canberra.

== Introduction ==
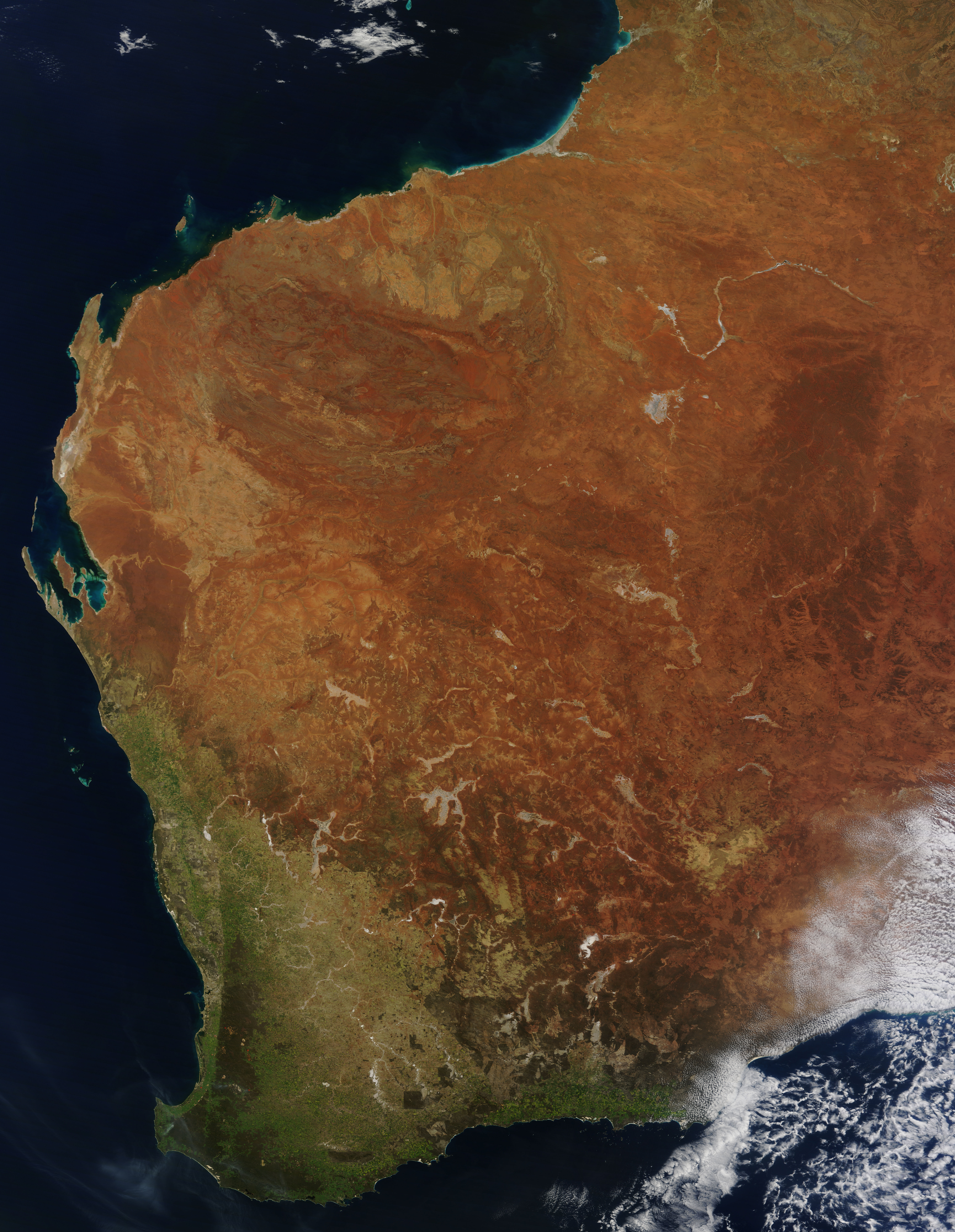
Western Australia seen from a satellite

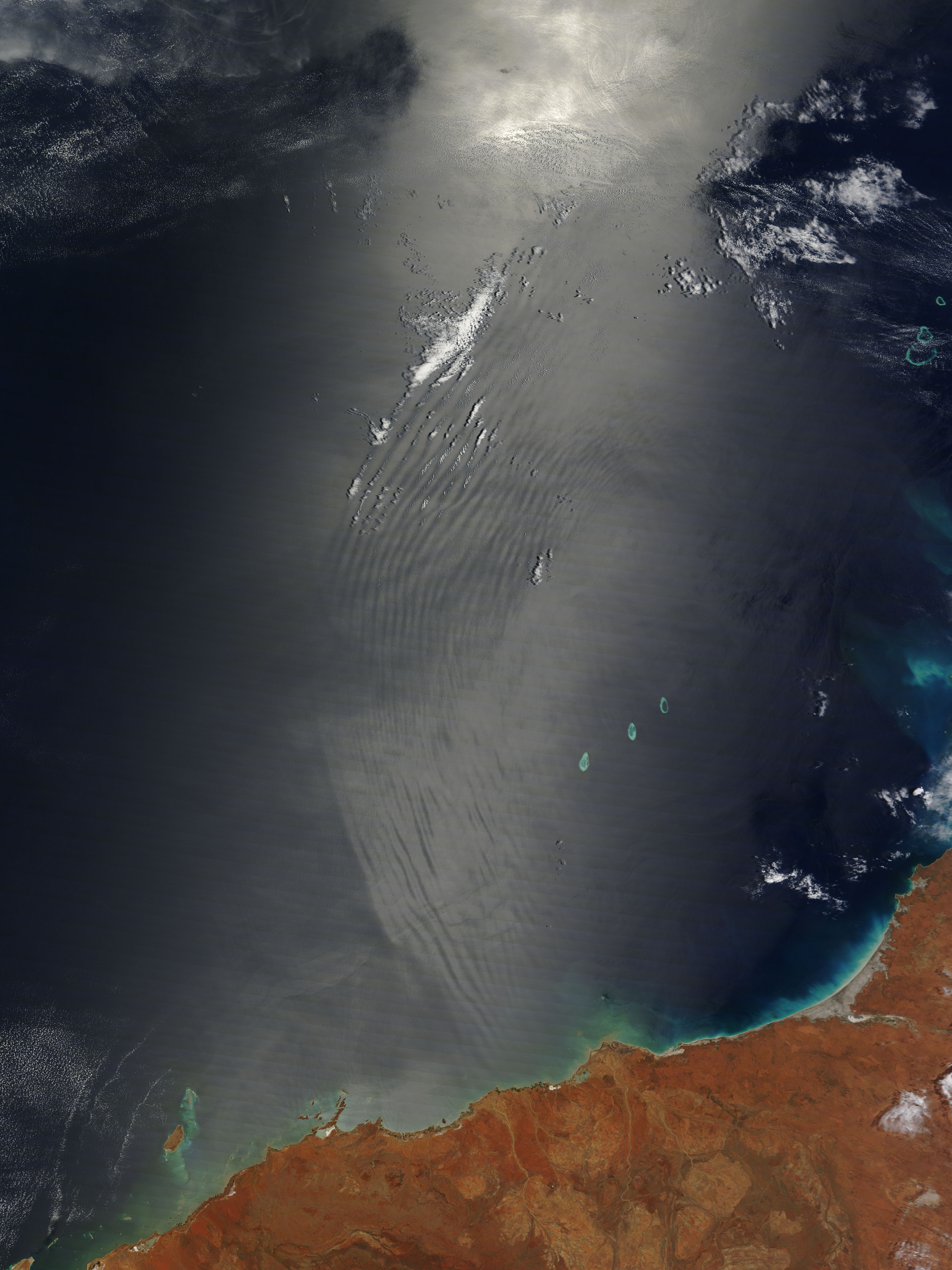
Atmospheric gravity waves off northwestern Australia

Western Australia's geology has components that are considered some of the oldest and most recent. The oldest minerals of the world have been discovered at the Jack Hills, and the Yilgarn craton of the Great Western Plateau, which occupies most of the state, has been above sea level for over 2.5 billion years, giving it some of the oldest soils on the planet.

The European settlement of Western Australia started in 1826, at Albany, but the state was only established as an administrative colony in 1829, and much of the state was only subsequently developed, with the extent of the pastoral industries from the 1860s and with the mineral industries from the 1890s to the present day. Western Australia has the highest proportion of non-state born population of any of the Australian states, and this coupled with the fact that over 76% of the population live in Perth means that the proportion of the population who have a deep understanding of the geography of their state is limited.

The geography of Western Australia has been of interest ever since the 17th century when the state was first visited by Dutch East India Company (VOC) explorers, traveling the shorter "Roaring Forties" route from Cape Town to Batavia (Jakarta) in what was then the Dutch East Indies (now Indonesia). Lacking the ability to accurately measure longitude, it was easy to overestimate the distance required to be traveled with the consequence that arrival upon the western shores of Western Australia became a more frequent occurrence.

Dutch explorers too often suffered from collision with the many reefs along the western coast, a result of the warm Leeuwin current, that baths the western shores, and has a huge effect upon creating the favourable Mediterranean climate of the south west corner of the state. Abel Janzoon Tasman, for instance, was sent from Batavia to scout the size of the new continent discovered. By the mid 18th century, the whole of the Western shoreline of the state had been mapped to a reasonable degree of accuracy, although these maps were improved subsequently by the British explorers George Vancouver, Phillip Parker King and Matthew Flinders.

== Climate ==
Köppen climate types in Western Australia

Western Australia is divided in half climatically by a belt of descending dry high pressure system airflow, generally along the Tropic of Capricorn between the north, in which a summer rainfall pattern predominates, and the south, characterised by winter rainfall.

The northern part of the state, characterised by Monsoonal circulation, in the winter months from May to September is of generally warm dry offshore winds, drawn across the Inter-Tropical Convergence Zone by the low pressure systems of Monsoon Asia. In summer, from November to March, with the displacement of the Intertropical Convergence over northern Australia, the weather is characterised by humid tropical onshore airflows, coupled with thunderstorms and an occasional cyclone, these weather patterns bringing the bulk of the rainfall of the region. The highest wind-gust recorded on the Australian mainland was 259 km/h at Mardi during tropical cyclone Trixie, in 1975 and Whim Creek has the record for the highest rainfall, at 747 mm in 24 hours, associated with a cyclone in 1898.

In the southern part of the state the bulk of rainfall comes from west to east moving cold frontal low pressure depressions, originating off the edge of the winter pack-ice in the Southern Ocean, south of South Africa. Cold southern airflows, wedging beneath humid north westerly winds triggers vertical instabilities, bringing this region the bulk of its rain between May and August. During the summer months these frontal depressions travel well to the south, leading to warm high pressure systems dominating the southern part of the state.

As a result, the state is classified with five climates in the Köppen climate classifications, ranging from Aw Tropical wet-dry climates in the Kimberley region of the state, through BSh Semiarid (summer rainfall) to the south of the Kimberley, BW Arid climates, covering the Great Sandy Desert, Central Australian Desert, Gibson Desert and the Great Victoria Desert, BSh Semiarid (winter rainfall), from Shark Bay to the Nullarbor, and then a Csa Mediterranean climate from Northampton to Esperance and covering the Southwest of the state.

=== Kimberley region ===
Between April and October the climate is characterised by dry months with clear blue skies, moderate daytime temperatures and cool nights. The "wet season" however, is hot and humid with monsoonal winds bringing consistent and sometimes torrential rain. Broome, (with a rainfall of 513 mm in 47 days) for instance has had 356 mm of rain in 24 hours. Cyclones forming off the coast, in the 1970s formed only twice a year and crossed the coast only every second year, although with global warming this frequency is increasing. The torrential rain swells the rivers through run-off, and the resulting floods in dry river beds can lead to loss of livestock, property damage and occasionally loss of life. Communities may be cut off through road flood damage. Prior to being dammed, the Ord River delivered more than 50 million litres a second, past Wyndham (652 mm in 56 days) into the Cambridge Gulf.

=== Central and Goldfields region ===
This is a region of salt-lakes, sand-dune rides, and is covered with desert oaks and mulgas. Laverton for instance has an average rainfall of only 192 mm over 41 days in average, although this rainfall is extremely erratic, and the area can go without rainfall for nearly a year, and then receive the equivalent of its annual rainfall in only a few hours. Close to the centre of the Western Australian border Giles Meteorological Station records only 219 mm of rain over an average of 43 days. Whilst Laverton receives the bulk of its rain from frontal systems that occasionally extend through to the Goldfields, Giles is generally dry from July through to September and gets the bulk of its rain from tropical cyclones which collapse into tropical depressions, bringing sudden rain into the interior.

=== Gascoyne and Pilbara region ===
This semiarid region lies astride the summer and winter rainfall regimes. In the north Dampier, for instance, with 402 mm of rain over 23 days has its wettest months in January, February and March, whilst Carnarvon with 239 mm of rainfall over 45 days, peaking June and July. Like in the Kimberley, this region is characterised by an extreme tidal range, leaving the coast surrounded by mangroves and mudflats, which, again like the Kimberley, in earlier years were important as a source of wild pearls and oysters. Inland the river gorges are inclined to flash flooding with the occasional sudden downpours, giving sufficient water for sheep and cattle stations.

=== Southwest region ===
This region has cool wet winters, and hot dry summers, with rainfall decreasing and summer temperatures increasing with distance from the sea. The region ranges from Pemberton, located in the Karri Forest region of the extreme southwest corner of the state has an average rainfall of 1244 mm over 167 days, to Bencubbin in the northeast wheat belt with only 319 mm over 73 days. Coastal regions are generally free from frosts, although frost conditions on winter nights are not uncommon. The state is generally snow free throughout winter, although an occasional fall is reported once or twice a year on the Stirlings or Porongurups north of Albany (837 mm over 179 days). Snowfalls have been recorded as far north as Wongan Hills, and as late in the year as November. Perth is supposedly the second windiest city in the British Commonwealth (after Wellington, New Zealand), and it is not uncommon in winter to have wind-gusts of up to 135 km/h. Forested areas generally have the highest rainfall, and there is a marked rain shadow effect along the Darling Scarp, with the result that the rainfall pattern shows an area of higher rainfalls extending from Collie north to the Chittering Brook and Karnet.

=== Depletion of stratospheric ozone ===
The southern half of Western Australia is greatly affected by the depletion of atmospheric ozone. While the rate of increase in the size of the ozone hole is slowing, 2006 figures produced by NASA show that the size of the hole that year was the biggest on record, averaging 27.4 million square kilometers in extent. As a result, the figures that suggest that 1/3 of Western Australians will in the course of their life suffer from skin cancers, has caused a huge change in popular behavior. From being a part of a nation of sun-loving beach-goers, Western Australians have adopted a habit of "slipping" on a shirt, "slopping" on a 15+ sunscreen and "slapping" on a hat. Unfortunately the effects of the ozone hole on Western Australian livestock, or on our native flora and fauna is much less understood. The increase in numbers of blind kangaroo suffering from ultraviolet caused cataracts has been recorded in local newspapers, but the overall effects has not been studied.

=== Climate change and global warming ===
The International Panel on Climate Change has shown that the natural ecosystems can absorb approximately two tonnes of carbon dioxide per person per year. At the moment the world, through the burning of fossil fuels and the clearing of forests is emitting 6.8 tonnes of carbon dioxide per person per year, with the result that over the last century the concentration of carbon dioxide has gone from 280 parts per million to 380 parts per million, a change equivalent to that seen since the depths of the last Ice Age. While in Europe the average rate of emissions is currently about 10 tonnes per person, and the average in the US is over 20 tonnes, for Australia as a whole produces about 26 tonnes of greenhouse gas emissions per person.

Western Australia emits 33.1 tonnes of net carbon dioxide equivalents (CO_{2}-e) per capita, making the state one of the highest contributors per capita in the world.

=== Examples ===
Climate data for Western Australia (Extremes)
Month	Jan	Feb	Mar	Apr	May	Jun	Jul	Aug	Sep	Oct	Nov	Dec	Year
Record high °C (°F)	50.7 (123.3)	50.5 (122.9)	48.1 (118.6)	45.0 (113.0)	40.6 (105.1)	37.8 (100.0)	38.3 (100.9)	41.2 (106.2)	43.1 (109.6)	46.9 (116.4)	48.0 (118.4)	49.8 (121.6)	50.7 (123.3)
Record low °C (°F)	0.9 (33.6)	0.5 (32.9)	−0.8 (30.6)	−2.2 (28.0)	−5.6 (21.9)	−6.0 (21.2)	−6.7 (19.9)	−7.2 (19.0)	−5.1 (22.8)	−5.0 (23.0)	−2.1 (28.2)	0.0 (32.0)	−7.2 (19.0)
Source: Australian Bureau of Meteorology

Climate data for Perth (Köppen Csa)
Month	Jan	Feb	Mar	Apr	May	Jun	Jul	Aug	Sep	Oct	Nov	Dec	Year
Record high °C (°F)	45.8 (114.4)	46.2 (115.2)	42.4 (108.3)	39.5 (103.1)	34.3 (93.7)	28.1 (82.6)	26.3 (79.3)	30.0 (86.0)	34.2 (93.6)	37.3 (99.1)	40.4 (104.7)	44.2 (111.6)	46.2 (115.2)
Mean daily maximum °C (°F)	31.2 (88.2)	31.5 (88.7)	29.6 (85.3)	26.0 (78.8)	22.3 (72.1)	19.5 (67.1)	18.5 (65.3)	19.1 (66.4)	20.5 (68.9)	23.4 (74.1)	26.7 (80.1)	29.4 (84.9)	24.8 (76.6)
Mean daily minimum °C (°F)	18.1 (64.6)	18.3 (64.9)	16.8 (62.2)	13.8 (56.8)	10.4 (50.7)	8.6 (47.5)	7.9 (46.2)	8.3 (46.9)	9.6 (49.3)	11.6 (52.9)	14.3 (57.7)	16.4 (61.5)	12.8 (55.0)
Record low °C (°F)	8.9 (48.0)	8.7 (47.7)	6.3 (43.3)	4.1 (39.4)	1.3 (34.3)	−0.7 (30.7)	0.0 (32.0)	1.3 (34.3)	1.0 (33.8)	2.2 (36.0)	5.0 (41.0)	7.9 (46.2)	−0.7 (30.7)
Average rainfall mm (inches)	18.5 (0.73)	14.3 (0.56)	20.4 (0.80)	35.4 (1.39)	87.7 (3.45)	127.3 (5.01)	142.3 (5.60)	124.4 (4.90)	82.7 (3.26)	37.7 (1.48)	24.2 (0.95)	10.4 (0.41)	730.9 (28.78)
Average precipitation days	2.9	2.3	4.5	6.8	11.2	14.5	17.2	15.9	14.6	9.2	5.5	3.5	108.1
Average afternoon relative humidity (%) (at 15:00)	39	38	40	46	50	56	57	54	53	47	44	41	47
Mean monthly sunshine hours	356.5	319.0	297.6	249.0	207.0	177.0	189.1	223.2	231.0	297.6	318.0	356.5	3,221.5
Source 1: Bureau of Meteorology; Temperatures: 1993–2020; Extremes: 1897–2020; Rain data: 1993–2020; Relative humidity: 1994–2011
Source 2: Time and Date; Dew point: 1985-2015

Climate data for Albany (Köppen Csb)
Month	Jan	Feb	Mar	Apr	May	Jun	Jul	Aug	Sep	Oct	Nov	Dec	Year
Record high °C (°F)	45.6 (114.1)	44.0 (111.2)	41.2 (106.2)	38.8 (101.8)	32.6 (90.7)	24.8 (76.6)	22.5 (72.5)	26.2 (79.2)	27.9 (82.2)	33.6 (92.5)	39.2 (102.6)	42.8 (109.0)	45.6 (114.1)
Mean daily maximum °C (°F)	24.8 (76.6)	24.9 (76.8)	24.1 (75.4)	21.9 (71.4)	19.0 (66.2)	16.7 (62.1)	15.8 (60.4)	16.2 (61.2)	17.3 (63.1)	18.8 (65.8)	20.9 (69.6)	23.1 (73.6)	20.3 (68.5)
Mean daily minimum °C (°F)	13.7 (56.7)	14.5 (58.1)	13.4 (56.1)	11.7 (53.1)	9.8 (49.6)	8.1 (46.6)	7.5 (45.5)	7.5 (45.5)	8.1 (46.6)	9.2 (48.6)	10.8 (51.4)	12.5 (54.5)	10.6 (51.1)
Record low °C (°F)	4.8 (40.6)	5.1 (41.2)	4.3 (39.7)	3.2 (37.8)	1.9 (35.4)	0.0 (32.0)	−0.2 (31.6)	0.8 (33.4)	0.7 (33.3)	1.0 (33.8)	2.7 (36.9)	3.6 (38.5)	−0.2 (31.6)
Average precipitation mm (inches)	23.6 (0.93)	22.3 (0.88)	33.6 (1.32)	61.3 (2.41)	89.8 (3.54)	108.0 (4.25)	119.3 (4.70)	106.8 (4.20)	88.5 (3.48)	70.8 (2.79)	47.0 (1.85)	27.8 (1.09)	798.1 (31.42)
Average precipitation days (≥ 1mm)	2.8	2.6	4.0	6.3	8.2	9.9	11.1	10.9	9.9	8.0	5.7	3.7	83.1
Average relative humidity (%)	69	69	71	76	78	79	79	77	75	75	73	70	74
Average dew point °C (°F)	13 (55)	13 (55)	12 (54)	12 (54)	10 (50)	8 (46)	8 (46)	8 (46)	8 (46)	10 (50)	11 (52)	12 (54)	10 (51)
Mean monthly sunshine hours	251.1	209.1	204.6	186.0	167.4	153.0	170.5	189.1	189.0	210.8	222.0	244.9	2,397.5
Source 1: Bureau of Meteorology
Source 2: Time and Date (humidity and dew point)

Climate data for Port Hedland (Köppen BWh)
Month	Jan	Feb	Mar	Apr	May	Jun	Jul	Aug	Sep	Oct	Nov	Dec	Year
Record high °C (°F)	49.0 (120.2)	48.2 (118.8)	47.0 (116.6)	42.8 (109.0)	38.8 (101.8)	35.5 (95.9)	34.4 (93.9)	36.8 (98.2)	42.2 (108.0)	46.9 (116.4)	47.4 (117.3)	47.9 (118.2)	49.0 (120.2)
Mean daily maximum °C (°F)	36.4 (97.5)	36.3 (97.3)	36.8 (98.2)	35.2 (95.4)	30.6 (87.1)	27.6 (81.7)	27.2 (81.0)	29.2 (84.6)	32.3 (90.1)	35.0 (95.0)	36.3 (97.3)	36.6 (97.9)	33.3 (91.9)
Mean daily minimum °C (°F)	25.6 (78.1)	25.5 (77.9)	24.6 (76.3)	21.5 (70.7)	17.3 (63.1)	14.2 (57.6)	12.4 (54.3)	13.2 (55.8)	15.4 (59.7)	18.6 (65.5)	21.4 (70.5)	24.1 (75.4)	19.5 (67.1)
Record low °C (°F)	18.1 (64.6)	16.3 (61.3)	15.8 (60.4)	12.2 (54.0)	7.0 (44.6)	4.7 (40.5)	3.2 (37.8)	3.7 (38.7)	7.7 (45.9)	11.1 (52.0)	12.4 (54.3)	16.6 (61.9)	3.2 (37.8)
Average rainfall mm (inches)	62.8 (2.47)	91.3 (3.59)	47.8 (1.88)	21.9 (0.86)	27.7 (1.09)	23.5 (0.93)	11.0 (0.43)	4.8 (0.19)	1.2 (0.05)	1.0 (0.04)	2.5 (0.10)	19.0 (0.75)	314.5 (12.38)
Average rainy days (≥ 0.2 mm)	5.1	7.1	4.4	1.9	3.3	3.1	2.1	1.2	0.9	0.8	0.6	1.8	32.3
Average afternoon relative humidity (%)	51	53	45	37	36	35	32	31	31	35	39	45	39
Source: Bureau of Meteorology

Climate data for Wyndham (Köppen BSh/Aw)
Month	Jan	Feb	Mar	Apr	May	Jun	Jul	Aug	Sep	Oct	Nov	Dec	Year
Record high °C (°F)	44.7 (112.5)	44.0 (111.2)	43.6 (110.5)	41.6 (106.9)	38.8 (101.8)	36.9 (98.4)	37.6 (99.7)	39.6 (103.3)	41.7 (107.1)	45.0 (113.0)	46.0 (114.8)	45.4 (113.7)	46.0 (114.8)
Mean daily maximum °C (°F)	36.9 (98.4)	36.0 (96.8)	36.0 (96.8)	35.8 (96.4)	33.5 (92.3)	31.0 (87.8)	31.2 (88.2)	33.5 (92.3)	36.7 (98.1)	38.8 (101.8)	39.4 (102.9)	38.1 (100.6)	35.6 (96.0)
Daily mean °C (°F)	31.6 (88.9)	30.9 (87.6)	30.7 (87.3)	29.7 (85.5)	27.1 (80.8)	24.3 (75.7)	24.1 (75.4)	26.1 (79.0)	29.7 (85.5)	32.3 (90.1)	33.3 (91.9)	32.6 (90.7)	29.4 (84.9)
Mean daily minimum °C (°F)	26.3 (79.3)	25.9 (78.6)	25.5 (77.9)	23.6 (74.5)	20.6 (69.1)	17.5 (63.5)	16.9 (62.4)	18.8 (65.8)	22.8 (73.0)	25.7 (78.3)	27.1 (80.8)	27.0 (80.6)	23.1 (73.6)
Record low °C (°F)	20.1 (68.2)	21.1 (70.0)	19.0 (66.2)	15.7 (60.3)	10.5 (50.9)	8.3 (46.9)	9.0 (48.2)	10.4 (50.7)	13.5 (56.3)	17.6 (63.7)	18.6 (65.5)	18.6 (65.5)	8.3 (46.9)
Average rainfall mm (inches)	185.7 (7.31)	210.1 (8.27)	158.6 (6.24)	36.0 (1.42)	8.4 (0.33)	3.9 (0.15)	3.1 (0.12)	0.0 (0.0)	4.0 (0.16)	22.7 (0.89)	56.4 (2.22)	156.1 (6.15)	845 (33.26)
Average rainy days	14.4	14.9	11.0	3.4	1.0	0.5	0.2	0.0	0.5	2.8	6.5	11.2	66.4
Average afternoon relative humidity (%)	50	53	47	34	29	26	24	24	27	31	36	43	35
Source: Bureau of Meteorology

== Biogeography ==
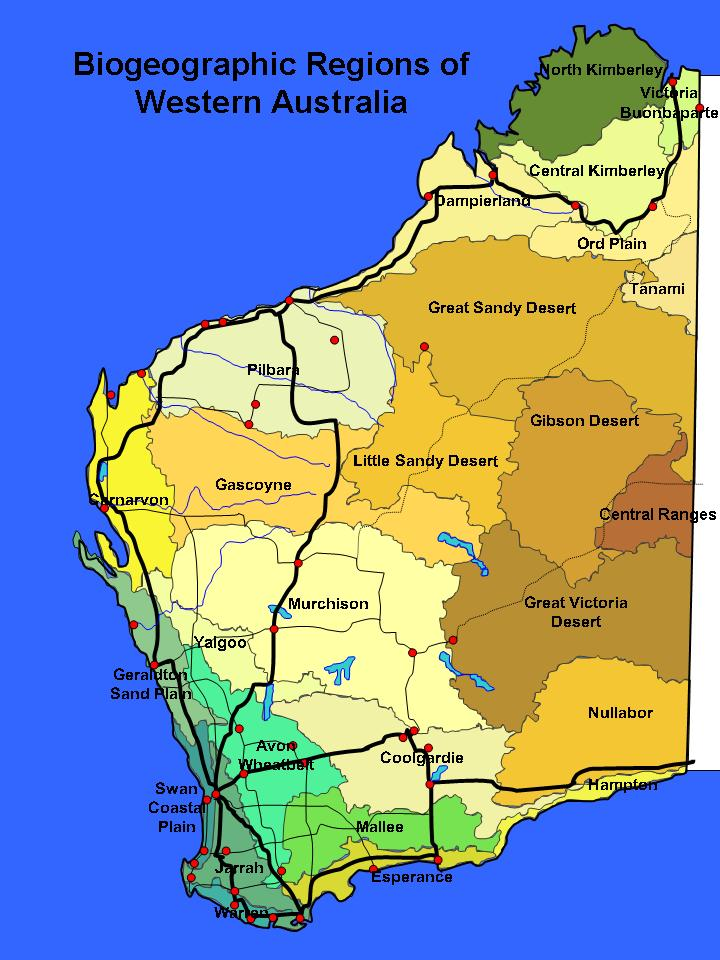

There are 25 biogeographic regions of 80 in the country, in the Interim Biogeographic Regions of Australia (IBRA) system. The IBRA was developed in 1993-94 under the coordination of Environment Australia by the States and Territories as a basis for developing priorities for the Commonwealth in funding additions to the reserve system under the National Reserve System Cooperative Program, to ensure that a balance of representative biogeographic areas were preserved by National Parks and Nature Reserves.

The detailed IBRA analyses addressed:

- The representativeness of the existing reserve system;
- Biases in the existing reserve system;
- Major threatening processes within each IBRA region; and
- Identifying priority IBRA regions in urgent need of further reserve additions.

In Western Australia this involved small changes in the Carnarvon Shark Bay area which was added to the Geraldton Sandplain region, Extension of the Yalgoo Region to include part of the Carnarvon region, transfer of the Salmongum woodland region from the Coolgardie to the Mallee biogeographic region and minor changes to the Central Ranges outliers.

The Avon Wheatbelt This is an area of active drainage dissecting a Tertiary plateau in Yilgarn craton. The gently undulating landscape of low relief has Proteaceous scrub-heaths, rich in endemics, on residual lateritic uplands and derived sandplains; mixed eucalypt, Allocasuarina huegeliana and Jam-York Gum woodlands on Quaternary alluvials and eluvials. The south eastern boundary has been modified incorporating a small portion into the Mallee region. The whole region has been extensively cleared for agriculture, and rapid dry-land salinity is a major problem.

The Carnarvon Region The Carnarvon region comprises Quaternary alluvial, aeolian and marine sediments overlying Cretaceous strata. There is a mosaic of saline alluvial plains with samphire and saltbush low shrublands, Bowgada low woodland on sandy ridges and plains, Snakewood scrubs on clay flats, and tree to shrub steppe over hummock grasslands on and between red sand dune fields. The Limestone strata are covered with Acacia startii and binervia shrublands outcrop in the north, where extensive tidal flats in sheltered embayments support Mangal vegetation.

The Coolgardie Region Granite strata of Yilgarn craton characterises Coolgardie, with Archaean Greenstone intrusions in parallel belts. Drainage is arheic and occluded. Mallees and scrubs are found on sandplains associated with lateritised uplands, playas and granite outcrops. Diverse woodlands rich are in K strategy endemic eucalypts, on low greenstone hills, valley alluvials and broad plains of calcareous earths. In the west of the region, the scrubs are rich in endemic Proteaceae, in the east they are rich in endemic acacias.

The Central Ranges There are a high proportion of Proterozoic ranges and derived soil plains, interspersed with red Quaternary sandplains in this region. The sandplains support low open woodlands of either Desert Oak or Mulga over Triodia basedowii hummock grasslands. Low open woodlands of Ironwood (Acacia estrophiolata) and Corkwoods (Hakea spp.) are found over tussock and hummock grasses which often fringe the ranges. The ranges support mixed wattle scrub or Callitris glaucophylla woodlands again over hummock and tussock grasslands.

Dampierland contains four distinct landforms.

1. The Quaternary sandplain overlying Jurassic and Mesozoic sandstones is covered with Pindan and with Hummock grasslands on hills.
2. Quaternary marine deposits are found on coastal plains, with Mangal, samphire – Sporobolus grasslands, Melaleuca acacioides low forests, and Spinifex – Crotalaria strand communities.
3. Quaternary alluvial plains are associated with the Permian and Mesozoic sediments of Fitzroy Trough and support tree savannas of Crysopogon – Dichanthium grasses with scattered Eucalyptus microtheca – Lysiphyllum cunninghamii. The Riparian forests of River Gum and Cadjeput fringe drainages along the Fitzroy River.
4. Devonian reef limestones in the north and east support sparse tree steppe over Triodia intermedia and T. wiseana hummock grasses and vine thicket elements.

The Esperance Plains Proteaceous Scrub and mallee heaths are found on the sandplain overlying Eocene sediments. This area is particularly rich in endemic species. Herbfields and heaths (rich in endemics) are found on abrupt granite and quartzite ranges that rise from the plain. Eucalypt woodlands occur in gullies and alluvial foot-slopes.

The Gascoyne In the Gascoyne region rugged low Proterozoic sedimentary and granite ranges are divided by broad flat valleys. Open mulga woodlands occur on shallow earthy loams over hardpan on the plains, with mulga scrub and Eremophila shrublands on the shallow stony loams of the ranges. For the Carnegie Salient, in the east, it is characterised by extensive salt lake features supporting succulent steppes.

The Gibson Desert The Gibson Desert is basically a lateritised upland on flat-lying Jurassic and Cretaceous sandstones of Canning Basin. Mulga parkland over Triodia basedowii is found on lateritic "buckshot" plains. Mixed shrub steppe of Acacia, Hakea and Grevillea over Triodia pungens occurs on red sand plains and dune fields. Lateritic uplands support shrub steppe in the north and mulga scrub in the south. Quaternary alluvia that are associated with palaeo-drainage features support coolabah woodlands over bunch grasses.

The Geraldton Sandplain The Geraldton Sandplain is a highly biodiverse region. Vegetation is mainly of proteaceous scrub-heaths, rich in endemics, on the sandy earths of an extensive, undulating, lateritic sandplain mantling Permian to Cretaceous strata. Extensive York Gum and Jam woodlands occur on outwash plains associated drainage.

The Great Sandy Desert The Great Sandy Desert is mainly a tree steppe grading to shrub steppe in south. It comprises open hummock grassland of Triodia pungens and Plectrachne schinzii with scattered trees of Owenia reticulata and Bloodwoods, and shrubs of Acacia species, Grevillea wickhamii and Grevillea refracta, on Quaternary red longitudinal sand dune fields overlying Jurassic and Cretaceous sandstones of the Canning, Centralian, Arunta and Armadeus Basins. Casuarina decaisneana (Desert Oak) occurs in the far east of the region. Gently undulating lateritised uplands support shrub steppe such as Acacia pachycarpa shrublands over Triodia pungens hummock grass. Calcrete and evaporite surfaces are associated with occluded palaeo-drainage systems that traverse the desert; these include extensive salt lake chains with samphire low shrublands, and Melaleuca glomerata – Melaleuca lasiandra shrublands.

The Great Victoria Desert The Great Victoria Desert is an arid active sand-ridge desert of deep Quaternary aeolian sands overlying Permian and Mesozoic strata of the Officer Basin. Between sand-dune ridges there is a tree steppe of Eucalyptus gongylocarpa, Mulga and Eucalyptus youngiana over hummock grassland dominated by Triodia basedowii.

The Hampton Region The Hampton Region comprises Quaternary marine dune systems on a coastal plain of the Eucla Basin, backed by stranded limestone scarp. Areas of marine sand are also perched along the top edge of the scarp. Various mallee communities dominate the limestone scree slopes and pavements, as well as the sandy surfaces. Alluvial and calcareous plains are found below the scarp support eucalypt woodlands and Myall open low woodlands.

The Jarrah Woodlands The Duricrusted plateau of the western edge of the Yilgarn craton is characterised by jarrah-marri forest on laterite gravels and, in the eastern part, by marri-wandoo woodlands on clayey soils. Eluvial and alluvial deposits support Agonis shrublands. In areas of Mesozoic sediments, jarrah forests occur in a mosaic with a variety of species-rich shrublands. This area has been heavily logged for timber, jarrah here being largely regrowth.

The Little Sandy Desert In this region red Quaternary dune fields have abrupt Proterozoic sandstone ranges of Bangemall Basin. There is a shrub steppe of acacias, Thryptomene and grevilleas over Plectrachne schinzii on sandy surfaces. Sparse shrub-steppe is found over Triodia basedowii on stony hills, with River Gum communities and bunch grasslands on alluvial deposits in and associated with ranges.

The Mallee Region This region has been re-defined to include an area from the Coolgardie Bioregion – the area between Lake Hope, Forrestiana and Mount Holland, which comprises Salmon Gum and Black Morrell woodlands on greenstone, with smaller areas of mallee and Acacia / Casuarina thicket on sandplains. The south-eastern part of Yilgarn craton is gently undulating, with partially occluded drainage. Vegetation is mainly mallee over myrtaceous-proteaceous heaths on duplex (sand over clay) soils. Melaleuca shrublands characterise alluvia, and Halosarcia low shrublands occur on saline alluvium. A mosaic of mixed eucalypt woodlands and mallee occurs on calcareous earth plains and sandplains overlying Eocene limestone strata in the east.

The Murchison This arid region of Mulga low woodlands, is often rich in ephemerals, on outcrop hardpan washplains and fine-textured Quaternary alluvial and eluvial surfaces mantling granitic and greenstone strata of the northern part of the Yilgarn craton. Surfaces are associated with the occluded drainage occur throughout with hummock grasslands on Quaternary sandplains, saltbush shrublands on calcareous soils and Halosarcia low shrublands on saline alluvia. Areas of red sandplains are covered with mallee-mulga parkland over hummock grasslands occurring widely in the east.

The Northern Kimberley This is dissected plateau of Kimberley Basin, covered with savanna woodland of Woolybutt and Darwin Stringybark over high Sorghum grasses and Plectrachne schinzii hummock grasses on shallow sandy soils on outcropping Proterozoic siliceous sandstone strata. Savanna woodlands on Eucalyptus tectifica – Eucalyptus grandiflora alliance over high Sorghum grasses on red and yellow earths mantling basic Proterozoic volcanics. Riparian closed forests of paperbark trees and Pandanus occur along drainage lines. Extensive Mangal occurs in estuaries and sheltered embayments. Numerous small patches of monsoon rainforest are scattered through the district.

The Nullarbor The Nullarbor is a Tertiary limestone plain with subdued arid karst features. Bluebush – Saltbush steppe are found widely in central areas, a low open woodlands of Myall over bluebush is found in peripheral areas, including Myoporum platycarpum and Eucalyptus oleosa in the east and west.

The Ord Victoria Plains Here level to gently undulating plains with scattered hills are found on Cambrian volcanics and Proterozoic sedimentary rocks; vertosols on plains and predominantly skeletal soils on hills; grassland with scattered Bloodwood and Snappy Gum with spinifex (Triodia) and annual grasses. The climate is of dry hot tropical, semi-arid summer rainfall. The lithological mosaic has three main components:

1. Abrupt Proterozoic and Phanerozoic ranges and scattered hills mantled by shallow sand and loam soils supporting Triodia hummock grasslands with sparse low trees.
2. Cambrian volcanics and limestones form extensive plains with short grass (Enneapogon spp.) on dry calcareous soils and medium-height grassland communities (Astrebla and Dichanthium) on cracking clays. Riparian forests of River Gums fringe drainage lines.
3. In the south-west, Phanerozoic strata are expressed as often lateritised upland sandplains with sparse trees. This component recurs as the Sturt Plateau Region in central Northern Territory.

The Pilbara There are four major components to the Pilbara Craton.

1. Hamersley. Mountainous area of Proterozoic sedimentary ranges and plateaux with Mulga low woodland over bunch grasses are found on fine textured soils and Snappy Gum over Triodia brizoides on skeletal sandy soils of the ranges.
2. The Fortescue Plains. This area comprises alluvial plains and river frontages. Salt marsh, mulga-bunch grass, and short grass communities are found on alluvial plains. River Gum woodlands fringe the drainage lines. This is the northern limit of Mulga (Acacia aneura).
3. Chichester. Archaean granite and basalt plains support shrub steppe characterised by Acacia pyrifolia over Triodia pungens hummock grasses. Snappy Gum tree steppes occur on ranges.
4. Roebourne. Quaternary alluvial plains are found with a grass savanna of mixed bunch and hummock grasses, and dwarf shrub steppe of Acacia translucens over Triodia pungens. Samphire, Sporobolus and Mangal occur on marine alluvial flats.

The Swan Coastal Plain This is arguably the most damaged ecosystem in the state. This is a low-lying coastal plain, mainly covered with Tuart-Banksia woodlands. It is dominated by Banksia or Tuart on sandy soils, Allocasuarina obesa on outwash plains, and paperbark in numerous former swampy areas. In the east, the plain rises to duricrusted Mesozoic sediments dominated by jarrah woodland. Three phases of marine sand dune development provide relief. The outwash plains, once dominated by Allocasuarina obesa-marri woodlands and Melaleuca shrublands, are extensive only in the southern part of the region.

The Tanami The Tanami region is of mainly red Quaternary sandplains overlying Permian and Proterozoic strata which are exposed locally as hills and ranges. The sandplains support mixed shrub steppes of Hakea suberea, desert bloodwoods, acacias and grevilleas over Triodia pungens hummock grasslands. Wattle scrub over Triodia pungens hummock grass communities occur on the ranges. Alluvial and lacustrine calcareous deposits occur throughout. In the north they are associated with Sturt Creek drainage, and support Chrysopogon and Iseilema short-grasslands often as savannas with River Gum.

The Victoria Bonaparte Phanerozoic strata of the Bonaparte Basin in the north-western part are mantled by Quaternary marine sediments supporting Samphire – Sporobolus grasslands and mangal, and by red earth plains and black soil plains with an open savanna of high grasses. Outcrops of Devonian limestone karst in the west support tree steppe and vine thicket. Plateaux and abrupt ranges of Proterozoic sandstone, known as the Victoria Plateau, occur in the south and east, and are partially mantled by skeletal sandy soils with low tree savannas and hummock grasslands. In the south east there are limited areas of gently undulating terrain on a variety of sedimentary rocks supporting low Snappy Gum over hummock grasslands and also of gently sloping floodplains supporting Melaleuca minutifolia low woodland over annual sorghums.

The Warren The Warren region is of dissected undulating country of the Leeuwin Complex and Albany Orogen with a wet Mediterranean climate, with loamy soils supporting karri forest, laterites supporting jarrah-marri forest, leached sandy soils in depressions and plains supporting paperbark-sedge swamps, and Holocene marine dunes are covered with Agonis flexuosa woodlands.

The Yalgoo Region This region is an interzone between South-western bioregions and Murchison. It is characterised by low woodlands to open woodlands of Eucalyptus, Acacia and Callitris on red sandy plains of the Western Yilgarn craton and southern Carnarvon Basin. The latter has a basement of Phanerozoic sediments. This Bioregion has been extended westwards to the boundary of the South-west Botanical Province, so that it now includes the Toolonga Plateau of the southern Carnarvon Basin. Semi-arid to arid, warm, Mediterranean climate. Mulga, Callitris- Eucalyptus salubris, and Bowgada open woodlands and scrubs on earth to sandy-earth plains in the western Yilgarn craton. Rich in ephemerals.

== Human geography ==
Map of Western Australia

=== Indigenous practices ===
The Western Australian environment was a creation of the indigenous Noongar, Yamatji, Wangai, Ngaanyatjarra and Kimberley cultures. In particular, firestick farming which through mosaic burning returned important nutrients to the soil, encouraged plant germination of indigenous pyrogenic species, and through accelerating plant growth increased the carrying capacity of the natural environment for indigenous fauna, reshaped the whole of Western Australia over the last 70,000 years. Many of the sites later to develop as European settlements had been Aboriginal meeting-grounds or campsites for a long time. Major roads too were located on Aboriginal trade routes and major hunting trails. These were used by Aboriginal guides and black-trackers who led European explorers to the most important local water supplies.

Unfortunately these were often fenced for sheep and cattle runs, and local Aboriginal groups excluded thereafter, trees cleared and local fauna shot. Nevertheless, many Aboriginal people subsequently found employment as shepherds or domestic servants in the new European Australian economy.

Today, Europeans have monopolised most of the lands with temperate wet climates. In Semiarid areas, the existence of a long-lived pastoral industry formerly dependent on Agricultural labour, enabled Aboriginal people to maintain traditional connections to country to a far greater degree, whilst in Arid areas European settlements were not to develop, and traditional hunting and gathering continued to early modern times. The cost to Aboriginal culture of western colonial practices associated with what has been called the "stolen generations" has been enormous. Aboriginal youth are now recognised as the most imprisoned population in the world.

=== European settlement ===
It is a frequently repeated commonplace of Australian historiography that the eastern border of Western Australia at 129° East derives from the 1494 Treaty of Tordesillas between John II of Portugal and Ferdinand and Isabella of Spain. This, however, has very little basis in fact. The Portuguese and Spanish never reached a formal agreement on the starting point or computation of its demarcation line and no known informal computation produces an antimeridian matching the Australian line. When the 1519 Magellan Expedition found a Southwest Passage to the Pacific and created the possibility of conflict over the Spice Islands (now Indonesia's Malukus), the 1529 Treaty of Zaragoza created an entirely separate demarcation line and waived all other rights to the contrary. Although similarly inexact, the line's position 297½ leagues or roughly 17° east of "the islands of Maluquo" placed it much farther east (near 144° E.), Charles V agreeing to a smaller hemisphere for a time in exchange for 350,000 ducats to fund his many other wars. Under the Iberian Union later in the century, the Spanish did not redeem or annul the treaty and the Portuguese continued to administer their separate territories; however, their maps began to use a demarcation line further west at 135° E. The Dutch, British, and French never respected any of these lines as generally binding, but in 1664 the French author Melchisédech Thévenot—apparently on his own initiative—published Abel Tasman's 1644 map of Australia, "correcting" the placement of Tasman's latitudinal scale to create a division between New Holland (Dutch by right of conquest after the fall of Malacca and the Portuguese East Indies) and a Terre Australe ("Southern Land") to its east, only partially claimed in the area of "Austrialia" where Pedro Fernández de Quirós had landed in 1606. (This later turned out to have been the separate Solomon Islands.) In 1786, the British then declared it to be the western boundary of New South Wales finding it convenient to ignore Dutch claims to the entire continent as they attempted to forestall potential French expansion and to replace America as a penal colony. The line was later moved west to 129° E. in 1825 solely to adequately cover the short-lived settlements at Port Essington and Fort Dundas. It was this line that was subsequently kept as the border of Western Australia in 1832.

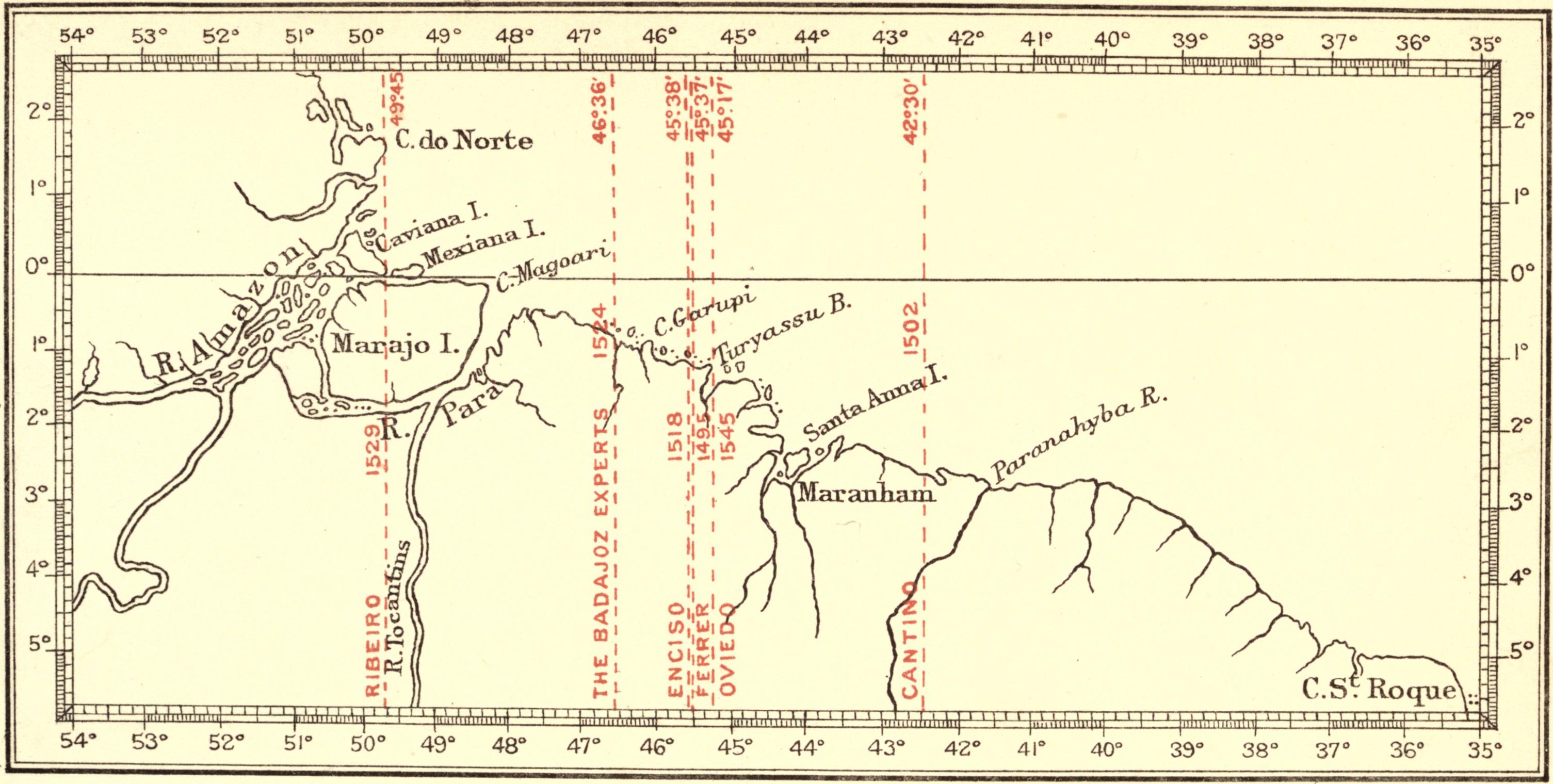
Harrisse's presentation of the various Spanish and Portuguese computations of the Tordesillas Meridian, producing antimeridians from 130° 15′ to 137° 30′ E.

Teixeira Albernaz's 1630 "General Chart for All Navigation" (Taboas Geraes de Toda a Navegação), displaying an antimeridian equivalent to 135° E.

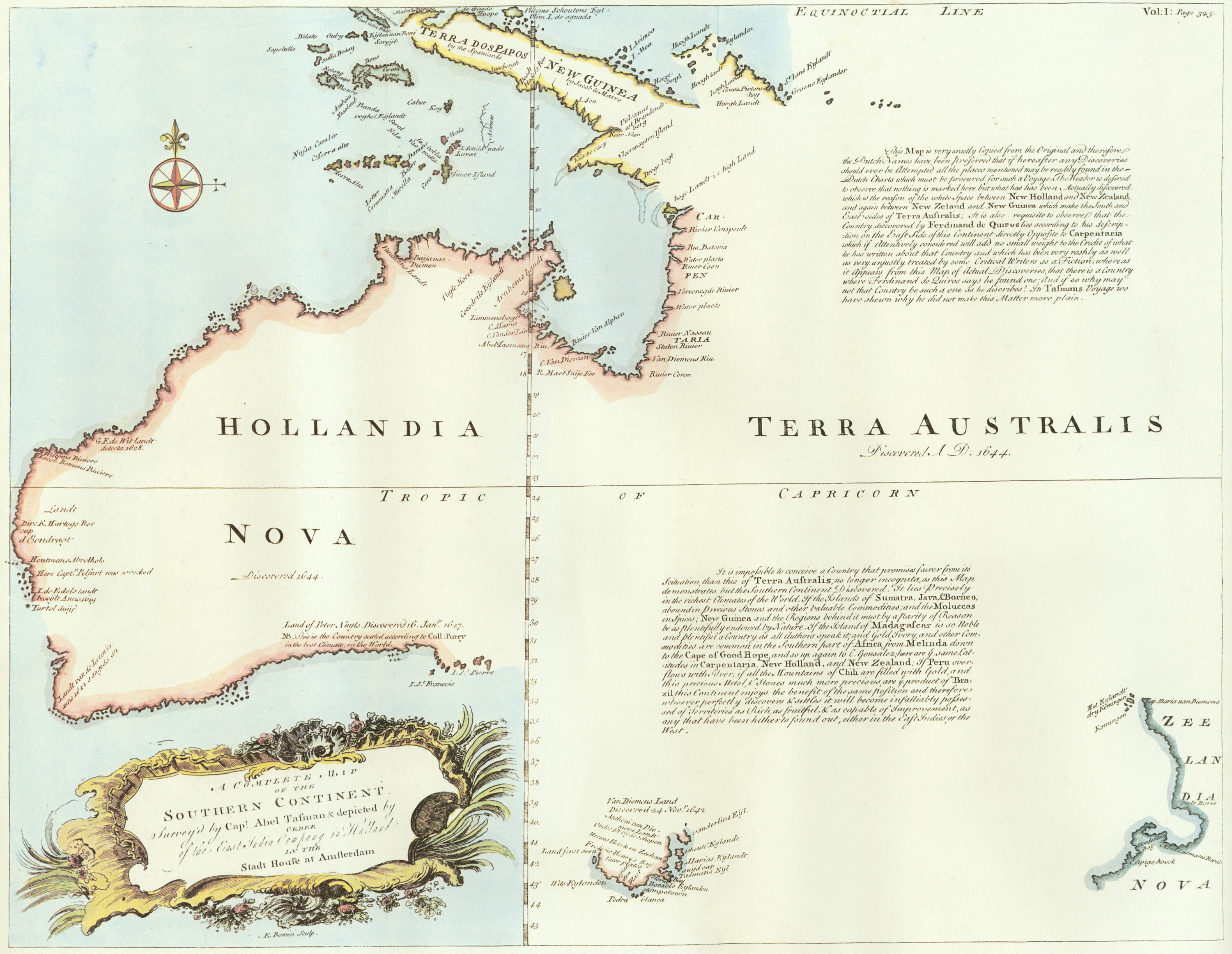
Bowen's 1744 reproduction of Thévenot's 1664 revision of Tasman's 1644 map, creating a new boundary at 135° E.

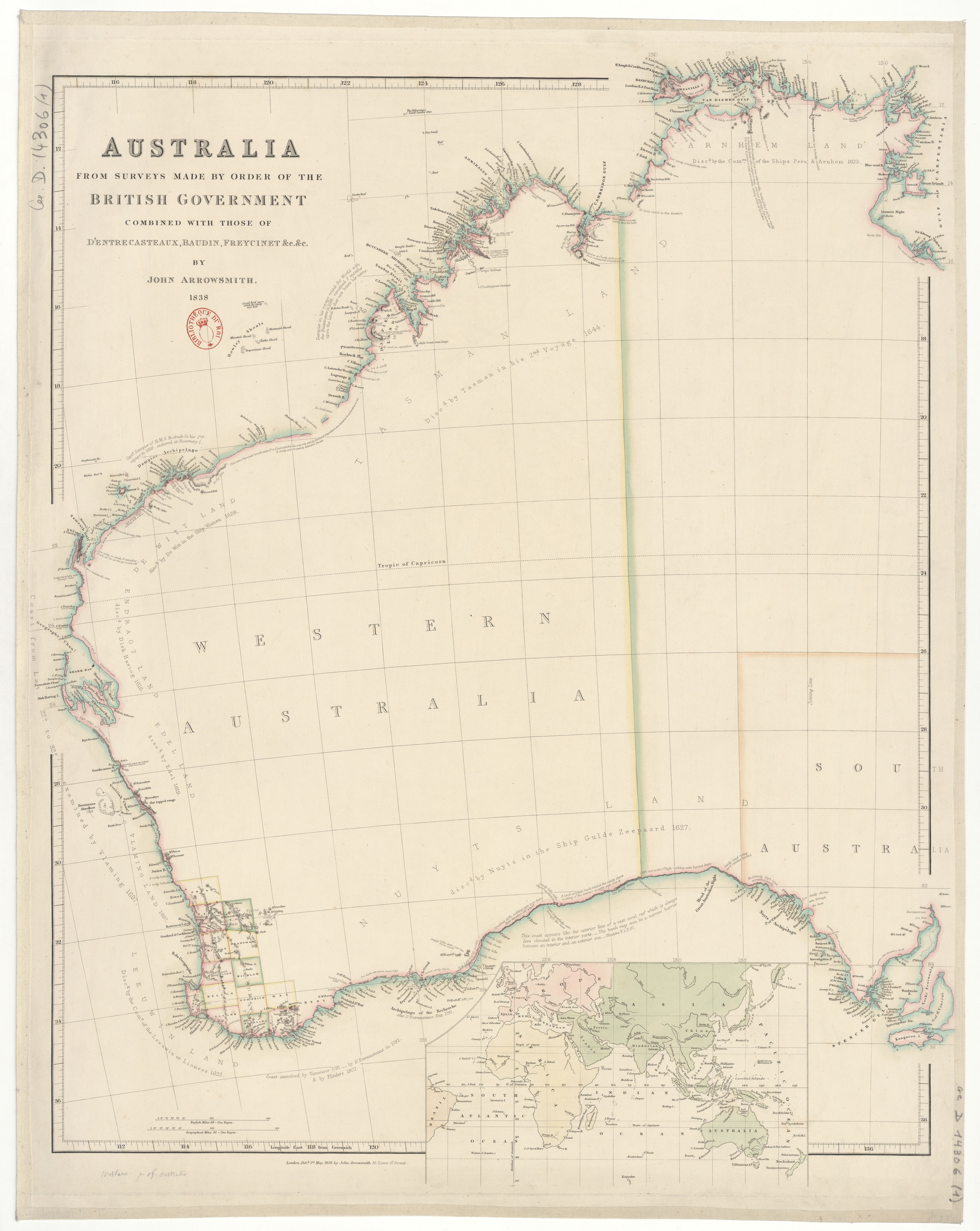
Arrowsmith's 1838 map of Australia, using the 129° E. meridian.

Maj. Edmund Lockyer on HMS Amity and Capt. James Stirling on HMS Success had explored the unsettled Dutch territory in 1827. Two years later, Capt. Charles Fremantle on HMS Challenger formally claimed the west coast of New Holland for King George IV. Stirling and the Swan River Company settled three easily defensible sites: Perth as their capital, Fremantle as their port, and Guildford as their agricultural centre. Australind, Bunbury, and Augusta were also chosen based on their ease of defense and accessibility by boat. With all settlers keen to ensure sea or river frontage for ease of transport, the original grants were all long and narrow, expanding from adjacent river lots. (See Land Grants in the Swan River Colony.)

The indigenous Aboriginal people were progressively excluded from their traditional lands as the British settlements expanded, even as the British used the Aboriginal tracks and lines to find sources of fresh water. Thus Albany Highway crossed the river at the fords of Matta Garrup ("Leg-Deep Place", now the Causeway), going south to Thomas Peel's lands along the Murray in Pinjareb country. Other early settlements were at Kelmscott and Armadale.

== Political geography ==
Western Australia is divided into 139 local government areas, each of which is known as a city, town, or shire. These jurisdictions range in area from 1 square kilometre (0.39 sq mi) (Peppermint Grove) to 372,301 square kilometres (143,746 sq mi) (East Pilbara) and in population from little more than 100 (Sandstone) to more than 200,000 (Stirling).

== See also ==
Australian context:-

- Geology of Australia
- Protected areas of Australia

Local features:-

- Islands of Perth, Western Australia
- List of islands of Western Australia
- List of lakes of Western Australia
- List of rocks in Western Australia
- List of watercourses in Western Australia

Regional divisions:-

- Interim Biogeographic Regionalisation for Australia
- Regions of Western Australia
