= Acacia ptychophylla =

Scientific classification
- Kingdom: Plantae
- Clade: Tracheophytes
- Clade: Angiosperms
- Clade: Eudicots
- Clade: Rosids
- Order: Fabales
- Family: Fabaceae
- Subfamily: Caesalpinioideae
- Clade: Mimosoid clade
- Genus: Acacia
- Species: A. ptychophylla

Binomial name
- Acacia ptychophylla F.Muell.
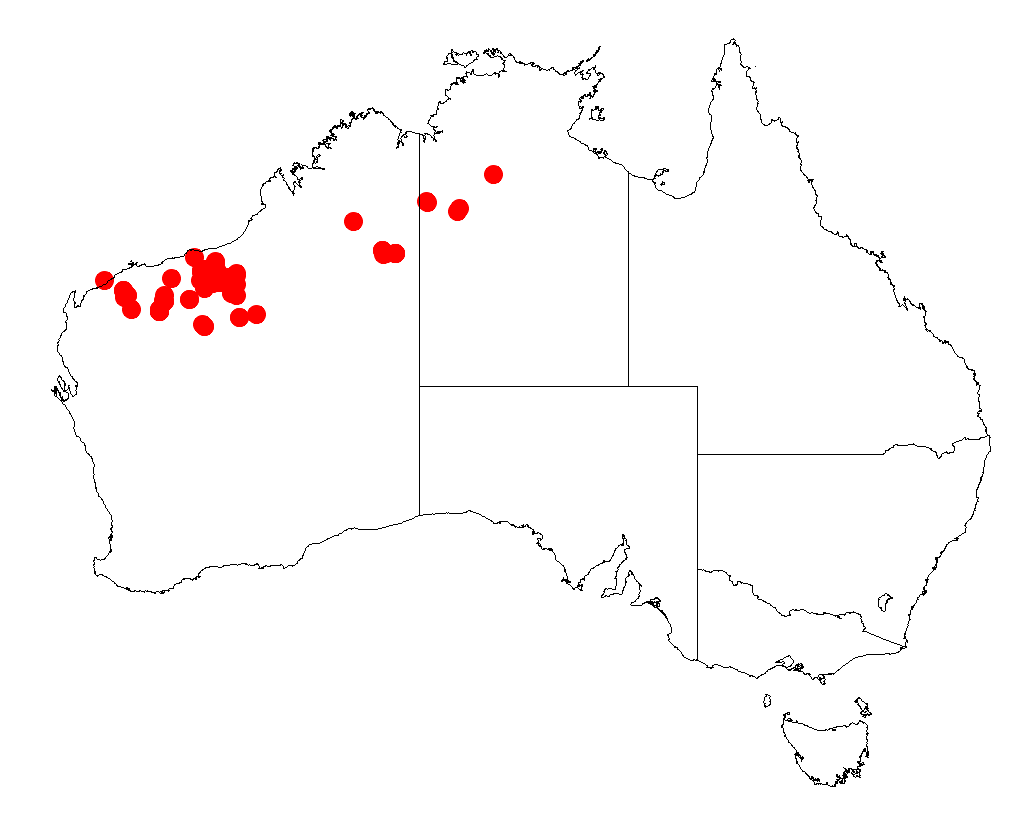
- Occurrence data from AVH

Species of legume

Acacia ptychophylla is a shrub belonging to the genus Acacia and the subgenus Juliflorae the is endemic to arid areas of north western Australia.

== Description ==
The bushy shrub typically grows to a height of 0.6 to 2.5 metres (2 to 8 ft) with a dense, spreading, multistemmed, flat-topped or rounded habit. It has glabrous and resin ribbed branchlets that are reddish brown in colour but yellow-green at the extremities. Like most species of Acacia it has phyllodes rather than true leaves. The glabrous, coriaceous and evergreen phyllodes have an oblong to narrowly oblong-elliptic shape and are straight or occasionally shallowly incurved. The phyllodes have a length of 2 to 5.5 cm (0.79 to 2.17 in) and a width of 3 to 10 mm (0.12 to 0.39 in) and often have a small callose tip at the apex, they usually have five to eight prominent and raised longitudinal nerves. It blooms from April to August and produces yellow flowers. The simple inflorescences are in the form of erect cylindrical flower-spikes with a length of 2 to 4.5 cm (0.79 to 1.77 in) packed with golden coloured flowers. Following flowering flat woody seed pods that are encrusted with resin form. The pods have a narrowly oblong to oblong-elliptic shape and are narrower at the base. The light brown, straight or shallowly curved pods are 5 to 7 cm (2.0 to 2.8 in) in length and have obliquely longitudinal nerves. The broen seeds inside the pods have an oblong-elliptic shape and are 4 to 5 mm (0.16 to 0.20 in) in length with a dark pleurogram.

== Distribution ==
It is native to the Pilbara, southern Kimberley and far northern Goldfields regions of Western Australia where it is found growing in stony soils and gritty alluvium and is often found along creek beds and on rocky hills. The disjunct distribution extends into the top end of the Northern Territory to around the Hooker Creek area where it is often situated on sand plains or rocky slopes as a part of spinifex communities.

== See also ==
- List of Acacia species
