= Melaleuca sylvana =

Scientific classification
- Kingdom: Plantae
- Clade: Embryophytes
- Clade: Tracheophytes
- Clade: Spermatophytes
- Clade: Angiosperms
- Clade: Eudicots
- Clade: Rosids
- Order: Myrtales
- Family: Myrtaceae
- Genus: Melaleuca
- Species: M. sylvana

Binomial name
- Melaleuca sylvana Craven & A.J.Ford

Species of flowering plant

Melaleuca sylvana is a species of flowering plant in the family Myrtaceae and is endemic to a small area near Ravenshoe in Queensland, Australia. It is a shrub or small tree with decussate, tiny egg-shaped leaves with the narrower end towards the base, heads of white flowers and nearly spherical clusters of woody capsules.

== Description ==
Melaleuca sylvana is a shrub or small tree growing to a height of 5 m (16 ft) with an open crown. Its leaves are decussate, egg-shaped with the narrower end towards the base, overlapping, stem-clasping and sessile, 1.5–3.7 mm (0.059–0.146 in) long, 0.9–1.7 mm (0.035–0.067 in) wide, crescent- or half-moon shaped in cross section.

The flowers are white and arranged in heads or short spikes between the leaves on new growth. The heads are up to 18 mm (0.71 in) in diameter and contain up to 10 individual flowers. The stamens are arranged in five bundles around each flower, with 9 to 12 stamens per bundle. Flowers appear in December and are followed by woody capsules, 4 mm (0.16 in) long and 4–5 mm (0.16–0.20 in) wide, in nearly spherical clusters about 9 mm (0.35 in) in diameter.

Melaleuca sylvana is similar to Melaleuca monantha with its tiny leaves and heads of white flowers, but differs by being a larger, single-stemmed shrub or tree with a less dense crown.

== Taxonomy and naming ==
Melaleuca sylvana was first formally described in 2004 by Lyndley Craven and Andrew Ford in the journal Muelleria from a specimen collected on a powerline access road near Herberton. The specific epithet sylvana is means "wood" or "forest", referring to the typical habitat where this species is found.

== Distribution and habitat ==
Melaleuca sylvana occurs in the Ravenshoe and Herberton districts, where it grows in heath, forest, and woodland environments, often on soils derived from rhyolite.

== Ecology ==
=== Response to fire ===
After a fire, Melaleuca sylvana resprouts from the stem base and along the stems through the activation of epicormic buds.
