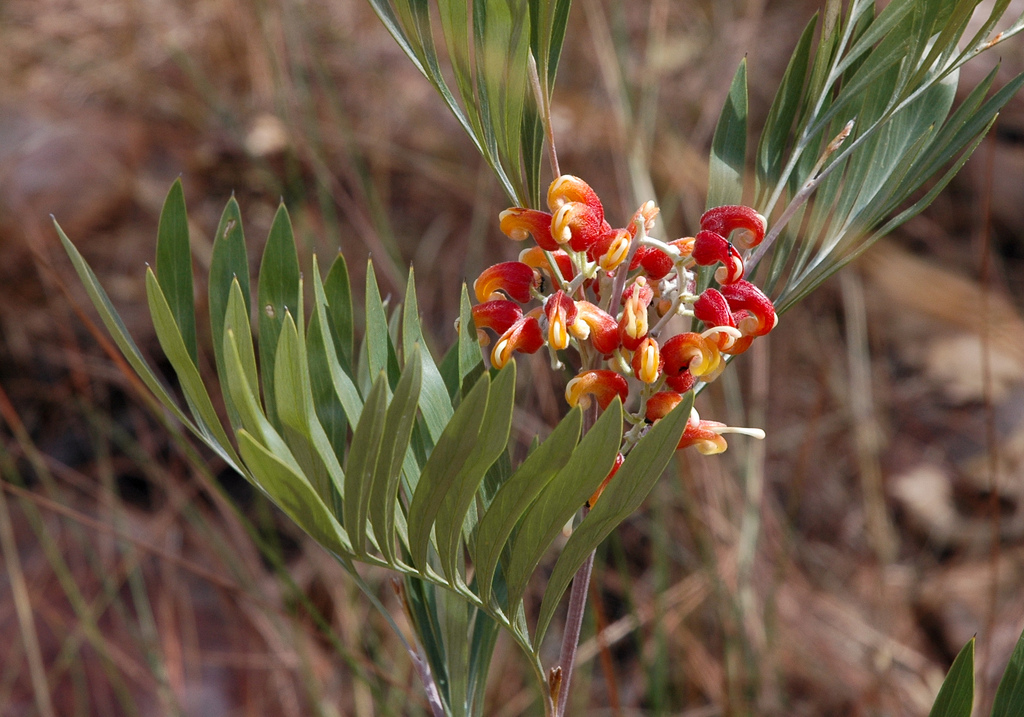

Scientific classification
- Kingdom: Plantae
- Clade: Tracheophytes
- Clade: Angiosperms
- Clade: Eudicots
- Order: Proteales
- Family: Proteaceae
- Genus: Grevillea
- Species: G. refracta

Binomial name
- Grevillea refracta R.Br.

= Grevillea refracta =

Species of shrub endemic to northern Australia

Grevillea refracta, commonly known as silver-leaf grevillea, is a species of plant in the protea family and is native to northern Australia. It is a tree or shrub usually with pinnatipartite leaves and red and yellow flowers arranged on a branched, downcurved raceme.

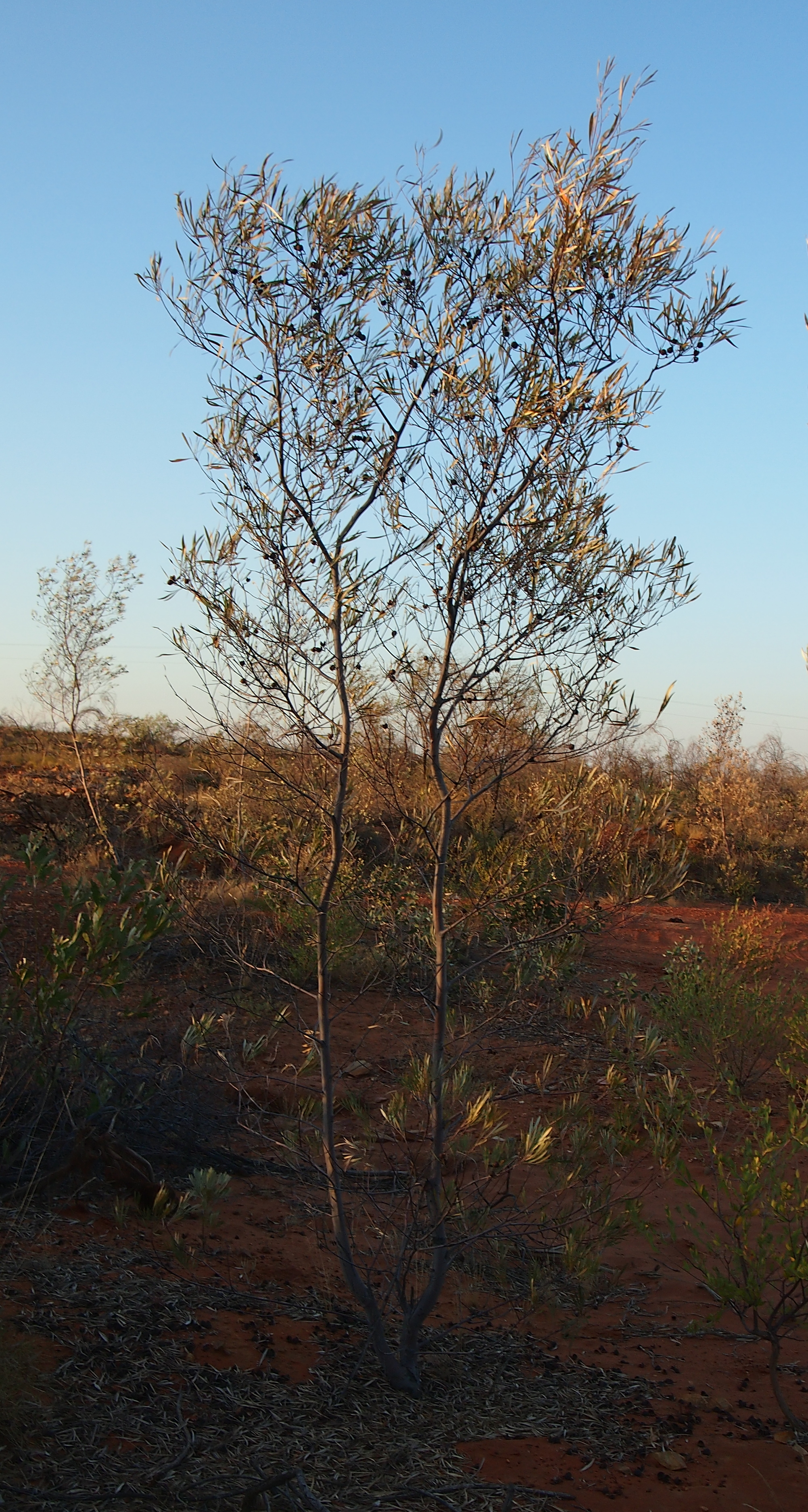
Habit near Tennant Creek

== Description ==
Grevillea refracta is a tree or shrub that typically grows to a height of 2–6 m (6 ft 7 in – 19 ft 8 in) and 4 m (13 ft) wide. The leaves are 40–210 mm (1.6–8.3 in) long and pinnatipartite with up to 27 egg-shaped to elliptic or linear lobes 40–130 mm (1.6–5.1 in) long and 1–45 mm (0.039–1.772 in) wide. Sometimes there are elliptic to more or less linear leaves 70–190 mm (2.8–7.5 in) long and 2–31 mm (0.079–1.220 in) wide. The lower surface of the leaves is hairy. The flowers are arranged on one side of an often downcurved raceme with 2 to 6 branches 5–20 mm (0.20–0.79 in) long, the oldest flowers at the tips of the branches. The flowers are red and orange, yellow or pink, the pistil 15–22.5 mm (0.59–0.89 in) long. Flowering occurs from April to September and the fruit is a thick-walled, glabrous, elliptic to more or less spherical follicle 18–31 mm (0.71–1.22 in) long.

== Taxonomy ==
Grevillea refracta was first formally described in 1810 by the botanist Robert Brown in Transactions of the Linnean Society of London. The specific epithet (refracta) means "bent downwards".

In 1994, Peter Olde and Neil Marriott described two subspecies of G. refracta and the names are accepted by the Australian Plant Census:

- Grevillea refracta subsp. glandulifera Olde & Marriott has leaves 120–150 mm (4.7–5.9 in) long, the divided leaves with 3 to 17 lobes 5–16 mm (0.20–0.63 in) wide.
- Grevillea refracta R.Br. subsp. refracta has leaves 80–170 mm (3.1–6.7 in) long, the divided leaves with 5 to 27 lobes 2–30 mm (0.079–1.181 in) wide.

== Distribution and habitat ==
Subspecies glandulifera grows in woodland and savanna and is found in the Ord River catchment in Western Australia, extending just into the far west of the Northern Territory. Subspecies refracta grows in woodland, savanna and Triodia communities and is widespread in Western Australia, the Northern Territory and north-western Queensland, including on nearby islands, north of about latitude 21°S.
