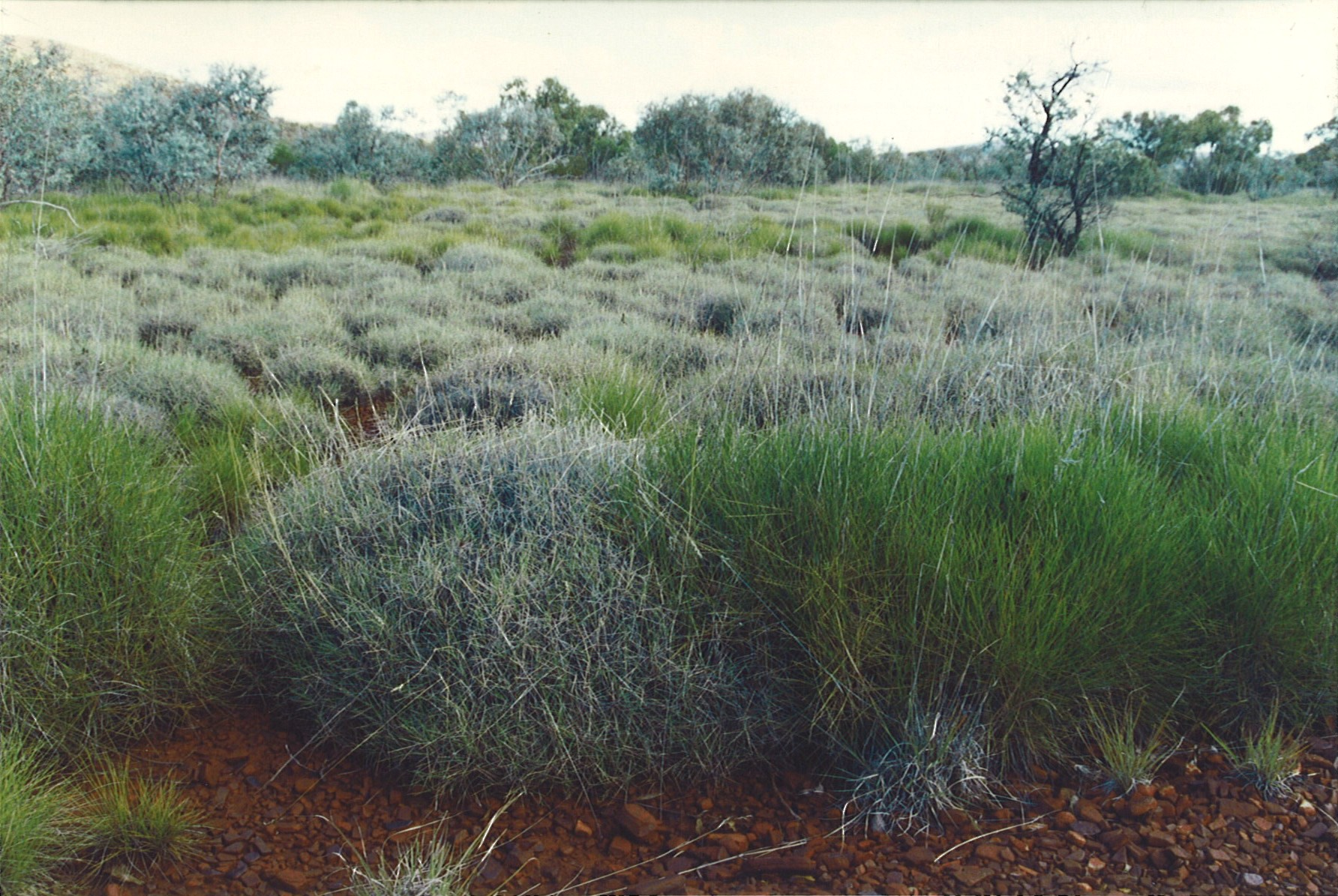
- Triodia pungens (green) and Triodia basedowii (blue-grey)

Scientific classification
- Kingdom: Plantae
- Clade: Embryophytes
- Clade: Tracheophytes
- Clade: Spermatophytes
- Clade: Angiosperms
- Clade: Monocots
- Clade: Commelinids
- Order: Poales
- Family: Poaceae
- Subfamily: Chloridoideae
- Genus: Triodia
- Species: T. pungens

Binomial name
- Triodia pungens R.Br. 1810

= Triodia pungens =

Species of plant

Triodia pungens, commonly known as soft spinifex, is a species of grass native to northwestern Australia. The plant is currently being researched due to its resinous properties as a Termite timber coating. Other research and applications are as a latex enhancer and bitumen adhesive.

In its natural habitat, the Spinifex is used by local Indigenous people as a weapon and housing adhesive.

Originally described by botanist Robert Brown in his 1810 work Prodromus Florae Novae Hollandiae, Triodia pungens still bears its original binomial name.
