= LCN =

LCN can refer to:

- La Coka Nostra, a hiphop music group
- La Cosa Nostra ("this thing of ours"): Italian or Italian-émigré organized crime syndicates, including:
  - American Mafia
  - Sicilian Mafia
- Landing Craft Navigation, a type of watercraft used in World War 2 for surveying landing sites for troops from landing craft
- Law Centres Network, the peak body for law centres in the UK
- Le Canal Nouvelles, a television channel in Quebec, Canada
- Lincoln railway station, whose station code is LCN
- Load Classification Number, also known as the Pavement Classification Number, a measure of the bearing strength of an airport runway
- Logical channel number (a.k.a. virtual channel), channel numbers used on radio and television sets
- Logical cluster number of a volume or logical drive of a computer
- London Centre for Nanotechnology, a nanotechnology research institute in London, England
- Low copy number, a DNA profiling technique
- Lcn. (× Laeliocatanthe), a hybrid genus of orchids, corresponding to Cattleya × Laelia × Guarianthe
- Balcanoona Airport, IATA airport code "LCN"

== See also ==
- Library of Congress Control Number (LCCN)
