= Mawson Plateau =

Plateau in South Australia

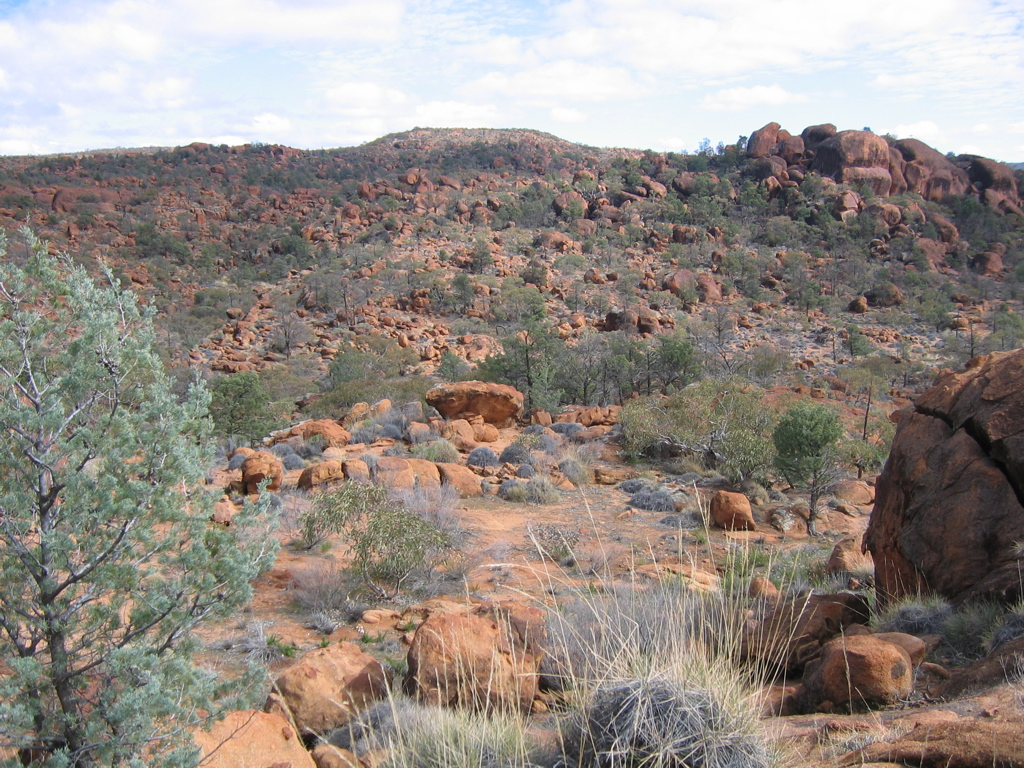
Typical Mawson Plateau terrain: rolling hills, with sparse vegetation interspersed with numerous eroded granite boulders

Mawson Plateau is a plateau located on the pastoral lease of Mount Freeling, but within the Arkaroola Protection Area, in the Flinders Ranges, South Australia. It lies around 140 kilometres (87 mi) east of Lyndhurst, and is adjacent to the northeastern boundary of Arkaroola Wilderness Sanctuary, which is also part of the Protection Area.

== History ==
=== Pre-European settlement ===
The northern Flinders Ranges were inhabited by Aboriginal Australians at least 49,000 years ago. At the time of first European contact the groups in this area were the Yardliyawara and the Wailpi, who are now part of the greater grouping of Adnyamathanha people.

=== Mount Freeling ===
Mount Freeling dates back to 1870. The now 1,000-square-kilometre (390 sq mi) Mount Freeling pastoral lease includes Mount Fitton, which was a thriving sheep station in the 1920s. The Mt Freeling homestead is located off the Strzelecki Track, about an hour's drive from Lyndhurst. There is an old copper mine (Yudnamutana) on the property, as well as the historic Mt Freeling Police Station built from local stone, and old school house. The Mt Fitton homestead is now a ruin.

As of 2016 Mt Freeling is home to the largest mob of yellow footed rock-wallabies known in Australia, which lives in the Brindana Gorge and Hamilton Creek areas, as well as a number of rare plant species. There are natural springs and waterholes on the property. Guest accommodation is offered in refurbished shearers' quarters, since the property was mostly emptied of livestock and instead focused on tourism.

As of 2013 the property was leased by GJB Nominees Pty Ltd. In 2016, the property was offered for sale, described as an opportunity to re-stock with sheep or cattle, or maintain for tourism. It was sold on 6 October 2016.

As of 2025 there are 4x4 tracks and camping available on the property.

== Geography and geology ==
Eroded granite column on the central plateau 30°5′18.3″S 139°26′51.4″E

Granite cliff overlooking Saucepan Creek

The Mawson Plateau lies within the Arkaroola Protection Area, on land that is part of the Mount Freeling pastoral lease, which lies north of the Arkaroola pastoral lease.

The plateau is a 70-square-kilometre (27 sq mi) granite batholith at a height of 600–750 m (1,970–2,460 ft). It is dissected by seasonal creeks, Saucepan Creek and the Granite Plateau Creek; both are tributaries of the Hamilton Creek. The plateau is bounded by the Hamilton Creek on the north and west, the Granite Escarpment on the east and Freeling Heights, its highest point at 944 m (3,097 ft), in the south. Hamilton Creek eventually drains into Lake Callabonna, which is usually a dry salt lake.

The plateau was described by Glenn Burns as "a tangled landscape of sandy creek beds, sand plains, rocky ridges and vast expanses of granite, covered by a mantle of loose, shattered rock and huge granite tors", almost totally waterless apart from some pools and deep potholes in the deep gorge formed by Granite Plateau Creek.

The Granite Escarpment is a 250-metre (820 ft) ridge of exposed and weathered granite on the eastern boundary of the plateau, overlooking Lake Frome.

Freeling Heights is composed of Freeling Heights Quartzite, formed during the Mesoproterozoic era (1590 to 1580 ma), and are among the oldest rocks in the Flinders Ranges.

The main plateau surface is composed of granite of Late Ordovician–Silurian age (442+/-6 ma). It is a major leucogranitic intrusion called British Empire Granite, which is light-coloured and highly radioactive. It also contains many pegmatites, and, within them, "ilmenite, magnetite, sphene, tourmaline, and a little beryl".

=== Names and places ===
Eroded granite boulders near the Granite Escarpment

Originally known as the Freeling Heights lower granite plateau, it was renamed the Mawson Plateau after geologist Sir Douglas Mawson, who did much research in the Northern Flinders.

The main creek on the plateau has been known by successive owners of the Mount Freeling pastoral lease as the Granite Plateau Creek. Saucepan Creek is a major tributary of the Granite Plateau Creek. The name refers to the discovery of two abandoned, or lost, saucepans found at different times, and at separate locations along the creek. One was found hanging from a river red gum at the junction (Saucepan Junction) of Saucepan Creek and the Granite Plateau Creek, the other was found near a major waterfall on Saucepan Creek.

There are a number of permanent waterholes on the plateau, including Tee Junction Waterhole. This waterhole appears on the Yudnamutana 1:50000 topographical map and is ~100m downstream from a distinctive T-junction on Granite Plateau Creek. The waterhole is the location of an old emergency rations cache put there in the early 1980s by the owners of the Arkaroola pastoral lease. Ray's Waterhole is a picturesque permanent waterhole on Saucepan Creek. Star Dropper Waterhole is a periodic waterhole upstream of Tee Junction Waterhole and is named after the solitary steel "star dropper" fence post found at the site.

Edmunds Hill is a small peak high on the central plateau, named after Lorraine Edmunds, Arkaroola's former information officer, National Parks South Australia employee, and conservationist.

== Hiking ==
A hike on Mawson Plateau that takes 7-10 days, starting via Mt Freeling Station and Mt Fitton Station ruin, passing through the old mine site, is described on the Adelaide Bushwalkers website.

== Climate ==
The plateau is located within one of Australia's major bioclimatic regions-the arid Eyrean region. Average rainfall on the adjoining pastoral lease of Arkaroola is 265 mm; however the Gammon Ranges Rainfall Project (Maier and Wright 1996), which began monitoring rainfall on the nearby Gammon Plateau at 930m in 1988, indicated that rainfall and number of rain days increases with altitudes greater than 400m above sea level in this area. With the Mawson Plateau at ~700m, rainfall averages are likely to be higher than those at Arkaroola.

Maier and Wright found that increased rainfall at altitude was predominantly winter rainfall, however the area is strongly influenced by summer storms. The influence of these unpredictable summer storms is reflected in the differences between the highest and lowest annual rainfall records recorded at Arkaroola (56mm – 949mm). Similar variations certainly occur on the Mawson Plateau.

== Fauna ==
=== Aquatic habitat ===
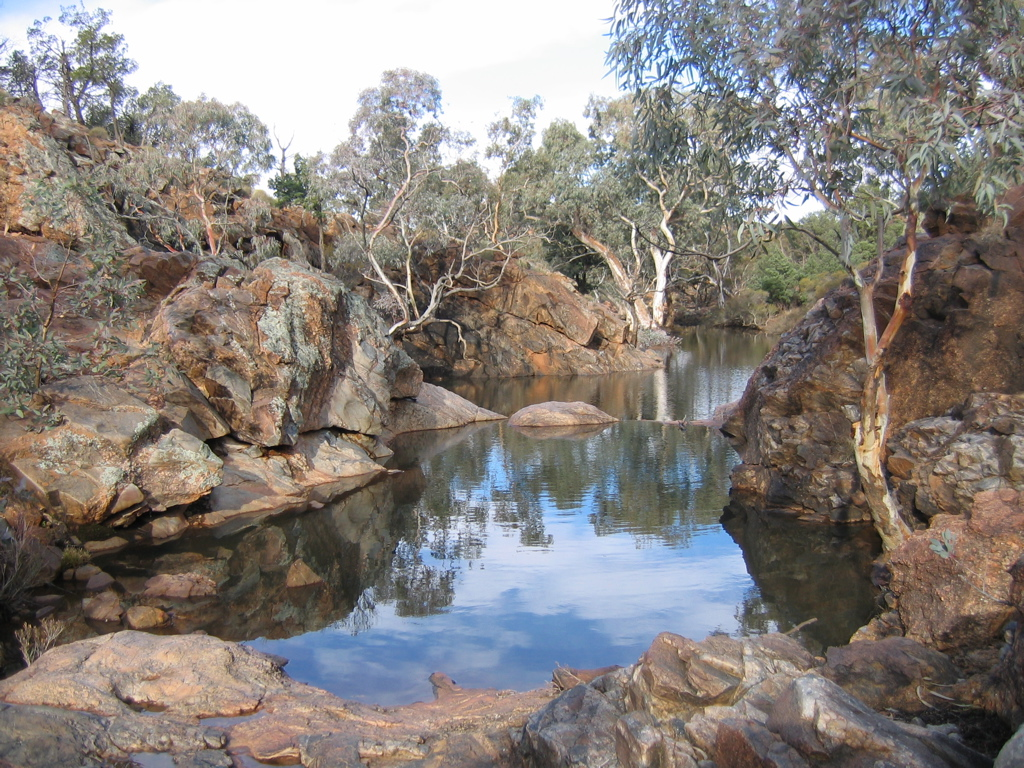
Waterhole on the Granite Plateau Creek

The plateau is a drainage basin for the Granite Plateau Creek, and its major tributary, Saucepan Creek. Both of these creeks flow only briefly after rain and as the region receives highly variable rainfall, water is scarce for most of the year and both creeks are ephemeral. In places the creeks have cut deep gorges and valleys into the plateau's granite, creating permanent and semi-permanent waterholes that support numerous species of frogs, including the brown toadlet (Pseudophryne bibroniiand).

The waterholes also provide habitat for water spiders (Dolomedes spp.) and small populations of unidentified fish. The fish are possibly spangled perch (Leiopotherapon unicolor), a widely-distributed desert fish common in much of the Hamilton Creek Catchment, or Lake Eyre Hardyhead (Craterocephalus eyresii), the most common and widely distributed fish in the Flinders Ranges.

=== Other animals ===
Mammals and birds are sparse on the plateau, but there are small populations of euros (Macropus robustus), and occasionally a rare yellow-footed rock-wallaby. Other mammals include echidnas (Tachyglossus aculeatusand), and a few species of bats.

Common birds include wedge-tailed eagle (Aquila audax), Australian raven, white-faced heron, white-browed babbler, singing honeyeater, woodswallow, and Australian Magpie-lark. willie wagtail (Rhipidura leucophrys), and the Australian boobook (Ninox boobook).

Reptiles have fared better than mammals, and there are numerous species of snakes, skinks, and lizards.

== See also ==
- Arkaroola
- Gammon Ranges
