= Mount Gee =

Mountain in Australia

- Location within South Australia

Highest point
- Elevation: 640 m (2,100 ft)AHD
- Coordinates: 30°13′37″S 139°20′39″E

Geography
- Location: South Australia, Australia
- Parent range: North Flinders Ranges

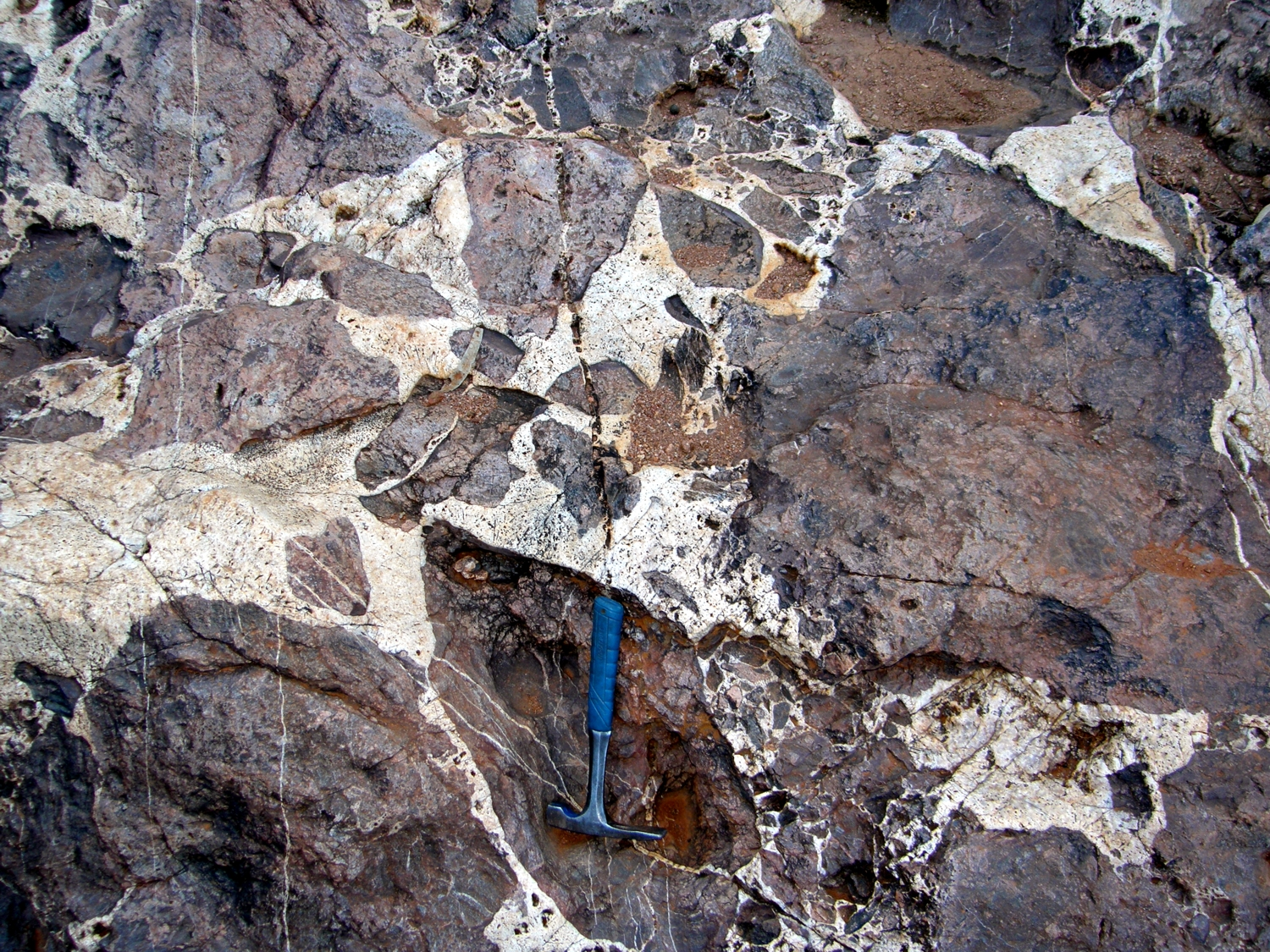
Uranium mineralised breccia at Mount Gee

Mount Gee is a mountain peak located in the northern Flinders Ranges within the Arkaroola Wilderness Sanctuary, and is part of the Mount Painter inlier. Both peaks are situated within the Arkaroola Protection Area, and the area is known for being a former site of mining exploration, in particular uranium.

Radium was discovered at Radium Ridge, near Mount Painter, in 1910, with uranium discovered as a by-product of the ore. Mining continued intermittently in the area until the early 1960s. Mount Gee, which is part of the "Mount Painter field", came to prominence in 2008–2011 because of uranium exploration occurring in an area that was commonly (and mistakenly) believed at that time to be protected from all mineral exploration. This situation was altered when the Government of South Australia created the Arkaroola Protection Area under the Arkaroola Protection Act 2012, which prohibits all mining activity in the Arkaroola Protection Zone.

== Geography ==
With its peak rising 600 m (2,000 ft) above sea level, Mount Gee is one of several peaks located in the visually spectacular and geologically significant range north-east of the Gammon Ranges and south of the Mawson Plateau. Mount Gee was entered on the Register of the National Estate in 1982 due to its "spectacular mass of quartz crystal and vughular, lining the cavities of crush breccias".

Mount Painter is taller, at 770 m (2,530 ft).

== Location history ==
Mount Gee and Mount Painter are both located in the Arkaroola pastoral lease, which was created in 1937 from an amalgamation of three leases. It was run as a sheep station, but, being located on a mountainous region and the worst pastoral land, it was difficult to raise and muster sheep. As of July 1946, Bentley Greenwood, brother of Gordon Arthur Greenwood, was running Arkaroola Station.

Arkaroola Station was purchased by Reginald and Griselda Sprigg in 1967 for the purposes of "wildlife preservations and conservation of the environment", with this objective being recognised by the South Australian Government initially in 1969.

From 2012 the pastoral lease, including the two peaks, along with some other land, was proclaimed under new legislation as the Arkaroola Protection Area, and mining was completely prohibited in this area.

== Geological significance ==
The oldest rocks of the Adelaide Rift Complex, as well as the oldest example of complex life, a type of marine sponge that lived in deep water, are in the Arkaroola Reef. The melting of Mesoproterozoic rocks created a unique Phanerozoic fossil "plumbing system" at Mount Gee which once had hot geysers similar to Yellowstone National Park in the US. The Paralana Hot Springs on Wooltana Station are a remnant of this geothermal system.

== History ==
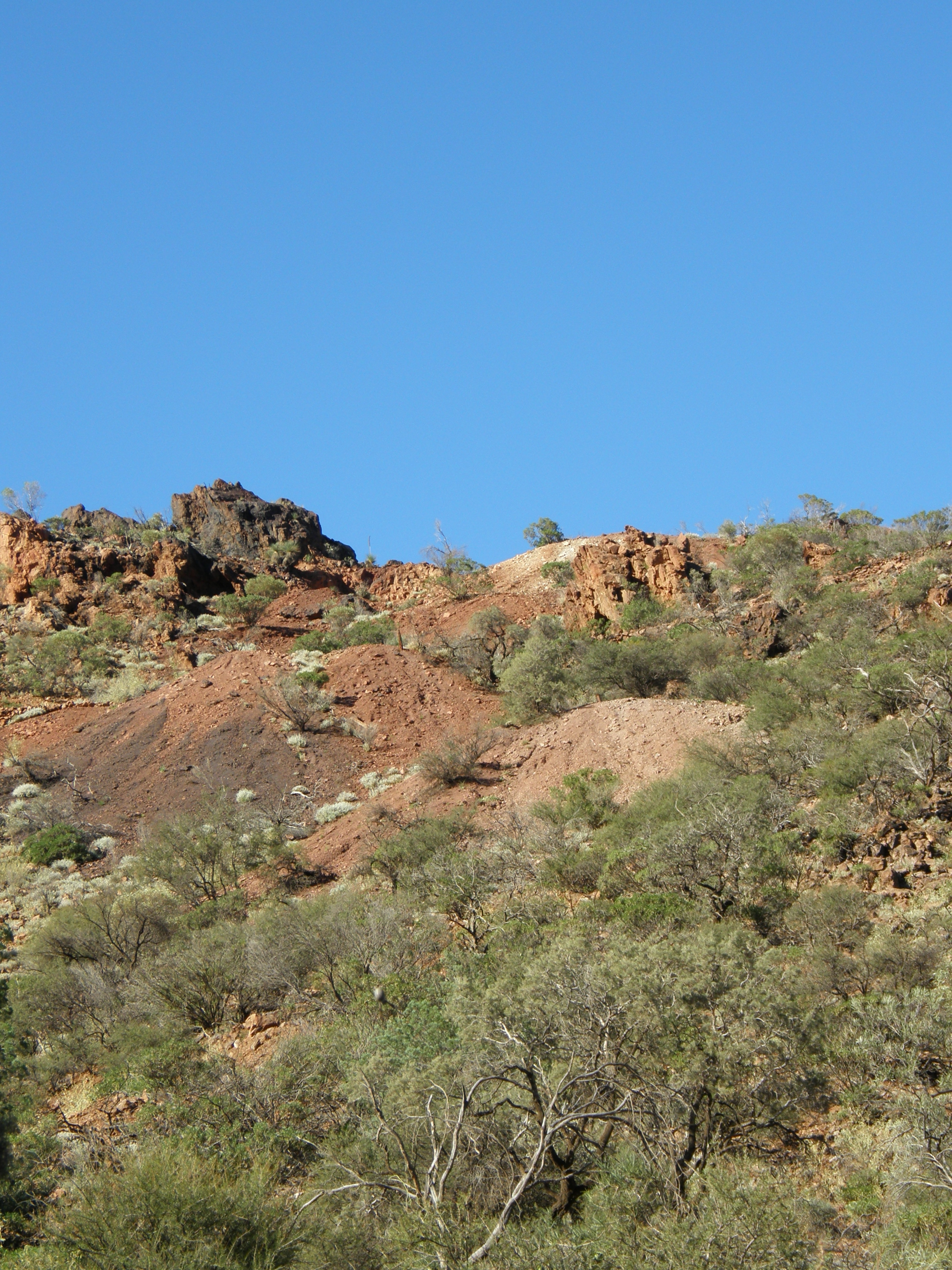
Mt Painter No. 6 workings, on a spur of Radium Ridge, south of Mt Gee

The northern Flinders Ranges had been inhabited by the Adnyamathanha people for at least 49,000 years before European surveyors and settlers came to the area.

Mount Painter was named by Surveyor General of South Australia George Goyder (1826-1898), after the surveyor J.M. Painter, who was responsible for the trigonometric survey in 1857.

Mount Gee was named after Lionel Carley Egremont Gee, who held various government positions, including as a general assistant and recorder at the South Australian Department of Mines. He wrote and compiled a number of government publications and books, including co-authoring Record of The Mines of South Australia, 4th ed. (1908), which used the notes from the inspections made by the Government Geologist, H.Y.L. Brown. Gee was also a justice of the peace.

Mineral exploration in the region began in the 1860s with the discovery of copper at a number of sites in the region, including the Yudnamutana copper field and the Lady Buxton mine, and numerous small diggings throughout the Mount Painter area.

In 1906 W. B. Greenwood discovered corundum in a creek, later named Corundum Creek, 4 mi (6.4 km) west of Mount Painter. In 1981 the Corundum Mine was placed on the register of geological monuments by the South Australian division of the Geological Society of Australia, owing to "its scientifically interesting mineral assemblage".

Sir Douglas Mawson, a geology lecturer at the University of Adelaide, first identified samples of torbernite (first named as carnotite), brought to him in 1910 by W. B. Greenwood, a local pastoralist and part-time government prospector, from what is now called Radium Ridge. (Note: Note confusion between father (William Bentley) and son (Gordon Arthur) Greenwood that seems to occur in several sources.) Greenwood had previously sent samples to the government in 1899, a year after radium had been discovered by Marie and Pierre Curie in France. However, government geologist Henry Y. L. Brown was away on stress leave when the specimens arrived, and they subsequently went missing. After Greenwood sent more samples in 1910, Brown was dismissive of their value, but Mawson, having recently visited Marie Curie in Paris, who had urged him to look for radium, thought the samples were worth analysis. He used two gold-leaf electroscopes given to him by Curie to do so. Mawson visited the area and wrote a report which was published in newspapers in late November 1910, which included a description of the geology of the area.

The 1910 discovery led to extraction of radium by the Radium Extraction Company of South Australia Ltd (RECSAL), which was incorporated on 28 November 1910. Both Mawson and Greenwood invested in the company, along with many people from Leigh Creek purchasing shares. RECSAL opened several other deposits during the following two years, the largest being the No. 6 workings near Mt Painter, which was opened in 1911. At least two other mining companies were formed shortly after RECSAL: Mount Painter Propriety Company Limited, and Mount Painter East Prospecting Syndicate. W. B. Greenwood's son, Gordon Arthur Greenwood, also worked with his father at Mt Painter, and in 1944 discovered talc deposits at Mt Fitton.

In 1911, government geologist Henry Brown visited the area, later that year contributing to the government publication The occurrence of uranium (radioactive) ores and other rare metals and minerals in South Australia, which was compiled by Lionel Gee under the authority of SA Premier John Verran, who was also Minister of Mines. The book included reports by Brown and others, including extracts from a report by Mawson.

Private companies developed the mines at Mount Painter, while the state government built a road from Umberatana to the mines, and wells to provide water for the haulage animals. Uranium ore was shipped to Europe until the advent of World War I in 1914, and RECSAL went into liquidation in 1917. Mawson had some uranium from the region shipped to Marie Curie.

In 1923 the workings were opened by a company later known as the Australian Radium Corporation, but the lack of water at the site inhibited the ability to construct an on-site leaching plant. Camels were used to carry crude ore to flatter terrain, where it was transferred to motor vehicles and to the railway at Copley, and thence to the Dry Creek treatment plant.

From 1923, Mawson became directly involved in efforts to develop uranium mining at Mount Painter, which continued until 1927. He returned with parties of students in 1929, and again in later years. After 1926, RECSAL developed the Paralana Hot Springs as a radioactive health spa.

The Australian Radium Corporation ceased operations in 1932. The radium extracted from the minerals mined here were valuable for their use in medicine, with little interest in uranium until the discovery of nuclear fission in 1939. The Mount Painter deposits were mined intermittently until 1934, when it (and the Radium Hill mine, near Olary) were closed owing to the ore's complex mineralogy, along with the discovery of pitchblende at Great Bear Lake in Canada.

During World War II, the Allies sought uranium from all over the world, for use in nuclear weapons. In 1944 exploration resumed at both Mount Painter (at the new East Painter Camp), Radium Hill, and other sites, after requests from the United States and United Kingdom governments. The area was locked down under tight security while a group of American, British, and Australian scientists, engineers, and military personnel explored the Mount Painter area thoroughly. Another road was built, from the eastern plain through the East Painter Gorge, and a new bore was sunk. Permanent buildings were constructed. From 1944 to 1950, the South Australian Department of Mines explored the Mount Painter area

In 1948 tax concessions were offered by the Commonwealth for successful discoveries, and other inducements were introduced in 1948 and 1952. A £1.8 million uranium treatment complex operated by the Government of South Australia at Port Pirie commenced operations in August 1955, processing ore from Radium Hill and Wild Dog Hill (Myponga), south of Adelaide. The complex supplied the UK-US Combined Development Agency and closed in February 1962.

However, uranium was more easily at Radium Hill, near Yunta, instead of in the Flinders Ranges, so operations were wound down, although Mount Painter and East Painter only finally closed in 1965.

Arkaroola Station was purchased by Reginald and Griselda Sprigg in 1967 for the purposes of "wildlife preservations and conservation of the environment", with this objective being recognised by the South Australian Government initially in 1969.

Uranium exploration activity around Mt Gee c. 1969–71

Oilmin NL and Transoil NL explored the North Flinders Ranges for uranium during the mid-1960s. Between 1968 and 1971, the Exoil–Transoil partnership undertook major exploration and drilling over a large area of the Mount Painter Inlier, which showed small uranium deposits. The Mount Painter field was were extensively explored for uranium between 1968 and 1982.

From 1990 to 1994, CRA Exploration carried out radiometric and aeromagnetic surveys, as well as some sampling from creek beds and drilling in the Mount Gee–Mount Painter area. These revealed a large amount of low-grade uranium mineralisation at Mount Gee East. The locations of the main deposits were named as Radium Ridge, Armchair-Streitberg, Hodgkinson, Gunsight, and Shamrock. In 2001, the following locations were named as having "significant prospects": Mount Gee, Mount Gee East, Radium Ridge, Armchair-Streitberg, and Hodgkinson. The deposits of uranium in the Mount Painter area are of the breccia-complex-type, with the largest deposit found at Mount Gee.

In 1995, the Flinders Ranges Heritage Survey, undertaken for the SA Department of Environment and Natural Resources, recommended a number of different types of sites in the area for state heritage listing on the South Australian Heritage Register, including the Mount Painter Mine Site. Mount Gee and Mount Painter were "identified as potential State heritage places but [were] not nominated at this stage", as places of geological value, along with Yudnamutana, The Pinnacles, Sitting Bull, Arkaroola Gorge, The Armchair, and a number of other sites on Arkaroola station.

In 1996 Arkaroola was granted official status as a wilderness sanctuary.

In 2003 the Mount Gee and Mount Painter area was included within the "Environmental Class A Zone" defined in the South Australian Development Plan, which had as its objectives: "the conservation of the natural character and environment of the area" and "protection of the landscape from damage by mining operations and exploring for new resources... Mining operations should not take place in the Environmental Class A Zone unless the deposits are of such paramount importance and their exploitation is in the highest national or State interest that all other environment, heritage or conservation considerations may be overridden". Deposits which might potentially have the required degree of significance were identified in a few localities, including a portion of the east Gammon Ranges and the Mount Painter-Freeling Heights area (which includes Mt. Gee).

Mining company Marathon Resources gave notice in September 2007 of its intention to apply for a mining lease allowing extraction of uranium ore from Mount Gee. To satisfy the environmental objectives, its application indicated an underground mine which would be serviced via a tunnel allowing access to infrastructure and processing facilities located away from the immediate vicinity of the Arkaroola area, on the plains near Lake Frome. The proposal was opposed by the owners and operators of Arkaroola Wilderness Sanctuary, in which the proposed mine would be located as well as conservation and anti-nuclear groups.

In January 2008 the owners of Arkaroola Wilderness Sanctuary were alerted to environmental contamination at Mount Gee. An investigation by the South Australian Government found that around 22,800 plastic and calico bags containing exploration samples, drilling material, cardboard and paper waste, plastic jars, PVC pipe, packing and other material were buried by the drilling contractor in two large shallow trenches. Under the terms of the agreement, Marathon was required to pour remaining drill samples back down drillholes; if this was not possible it was permissible to bury them, but removal of sample bags and any other rubbish was required. Marathon Resources admitted in a subsequent rectification plan that 20 drums of samples were buried in a nearby site, as well as various food packaging and personal protective equipment waste at another nearby site. In response to this investigation, the SA Minister for Mineral Resources Development found this method of disposal of non-drill sample waste constituted a breach of licence conditions, and suspended Marathon Resources' mineral exploration licence for Mount Gee. Marathon recovered the dumped rubbish and drill samples and transported them to the Hawker rubbish dump for disposal, and rehabilitated many of the drill sites and access tracks, and in October 2009 the Rann government granted a 12-month exploration licence to Marathon Resources. In October 2009, the government released a draft management plan for the Northern Flinders Ranges, called "Seeking a Balance". According to its opponents, this plan allowed for mining activity right in the heart of the Arkaroola Sanctuary.

== Protection ==
Following the public outcry that resulted from Marathon Resources' misconduct in the Arkaroola Wilderness Sanctuary – including the illegal dumping of waste in several shallow pits and the alleged excavation and removal of mineral specimens unrelated to the mineral exploration program – the South Australian Government later promised to introduce legislation to ban all mining activities in the sanctuary. The Arkaroola Protection Act 2012 prohibits any mining in the entire Arkaroola Protection Zone, which includes Mt Gee and the Mt Painter inlier.

Arkaroola was listed on the state heritage register on 17 July 2012, for its "outstanding scientific, environmental, cultural and social values", as one of the most diverse landscapes in South Australia. Of particular geological value, Mount Gee and Mount Painter are located where Precambrian and earlier periods in the formation of the Earth's crust, including "hot rocks" can be seen and researched.

== See also ==
- Uranium mining in Australia
