= Mount Serle =

Mountain peak and pastoral lease in South Australia

Coordinates: 30°30′05″S 138°54′00″E

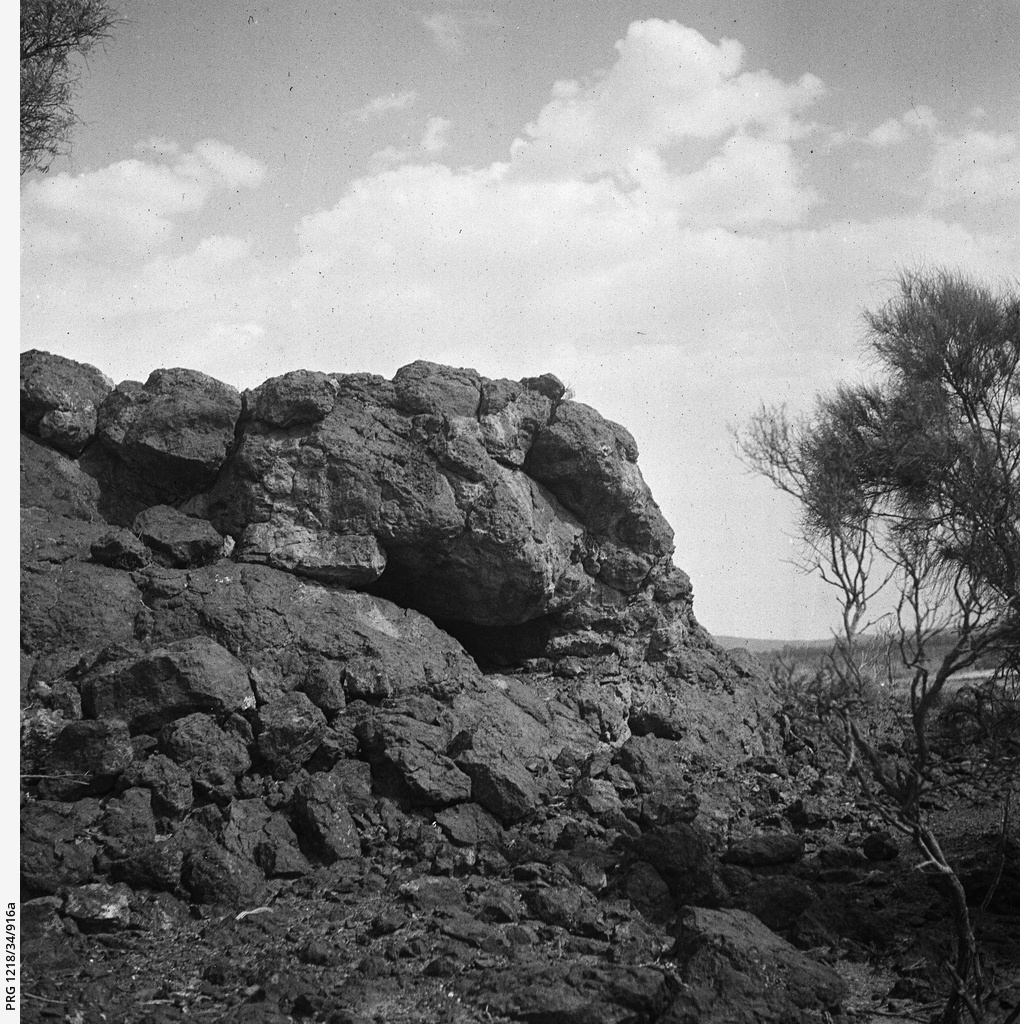
A photograph taken on Mt Serle by Charles P. Mountford

Mount Serle is the name of both a mountain peak and a former sheep station in the Flinders Ranges of South Australia. Known by the name Arta-wararlpanha, the location is also of important cultural and spiritual significance to the Adnyamathanha people, who lived there long before European settlement in the mid-19th century. The Greenwood family were prominent pastoralists as well as mineral prospectors in the area, in particular William Bentley Greenwood and his son Gordon Arthur Greenwood. W. B. Greenwood discovered the uranium deposits at Mount Painter (now part of Arkaroola Protection Area), which were identified by geologist Douglas Mawson in 1910. The station was poor pastoral country, and has been destocked. Although not an official protected area, is home to many native animals.

== Location ==
The property is located around 48 km (30 mi) east of Copley, with the peak itself 3–4 mi (4.8–6.4 km) north of the old station homestead, in the northern Flinders Ranges. There was formerly a station to the northwest called Yankaninna.

Mount Serle land lies just west of what are today the Aboriginal land of Nepabunna and the Vulkathunha-Gammon Ranges National Park.

Mount Serle peak is around 20 km (12 mi) west of Mount McKinlay.

== History ==
The peak has been known by its Adnyamathanha name, rendered variously as Arta-wararlpanha, Athuurapanha, or Artoowarapana. The peak and local area are important features in the history, culture, and spirituality of the Adnyamathanha people, including being part of one of their Dreaming trails. The area was one of their main campsites before European settlement in the region, and, after the arrival of European settlers, conflict over resources sometimes occurred. which was still in existence in 1862.

The peak was given its English name on 27 August 1840 by explorer and colonial administrator Edward John Eyre on an exploratory expedition to the area. It was so named at the request of George Gawler, then Governor of South Australia, after a friend, probably his private secretary Henry Serle. (Note: Serle is described by Microsoft Copilot thus: "Governor George Gawler had a close associate named Henry Serle, who served as his private secretary during his tenure as Governor of South Australia from 1838 to 1841. Serle was not only a trusted aide but also a companion in Gawler's administrative and exploratory activities... A solid primary source confirming that Henry Serle was George Gawler's private secretary is the Gawler Family Papers held by the State Library of South Australia. These are catalogued under PRG 50". However the original source is not available online at this point.)

Mt Serle was originally run as a sheep station. In 1856 Walter and Thomas McFarlane acquired the pastoral lease, along with nearby Owieandana. They left in 1859 and the lease was auctioned on 7 June 1860, bought by Abraham Scott. He took it up on 1 July, and also acquired several more leases; by 1867 he was in charge of some 250 mi^{2} (650 km^{2}) of land around Mount Serle.

A police station opened in March 1859, with Corporal Alfred Burt stationed there to keep the peace between the Indigenous people and the settlers. Later that year, year Crown Land Ranger Alexander Tolmer stayed at the station to recover from illness. In 1862, one corporal and three constables manned the station, but they their horses were in very poor condition and they could not travel far on them. Horse feed was expensive, having to be brought from Port Augusta by teams of bullocks, and horseshoes and nails were in short supply.

In 1860 a post office was opened at Mount Serle, which was closed a few years later but reopened in 1893.

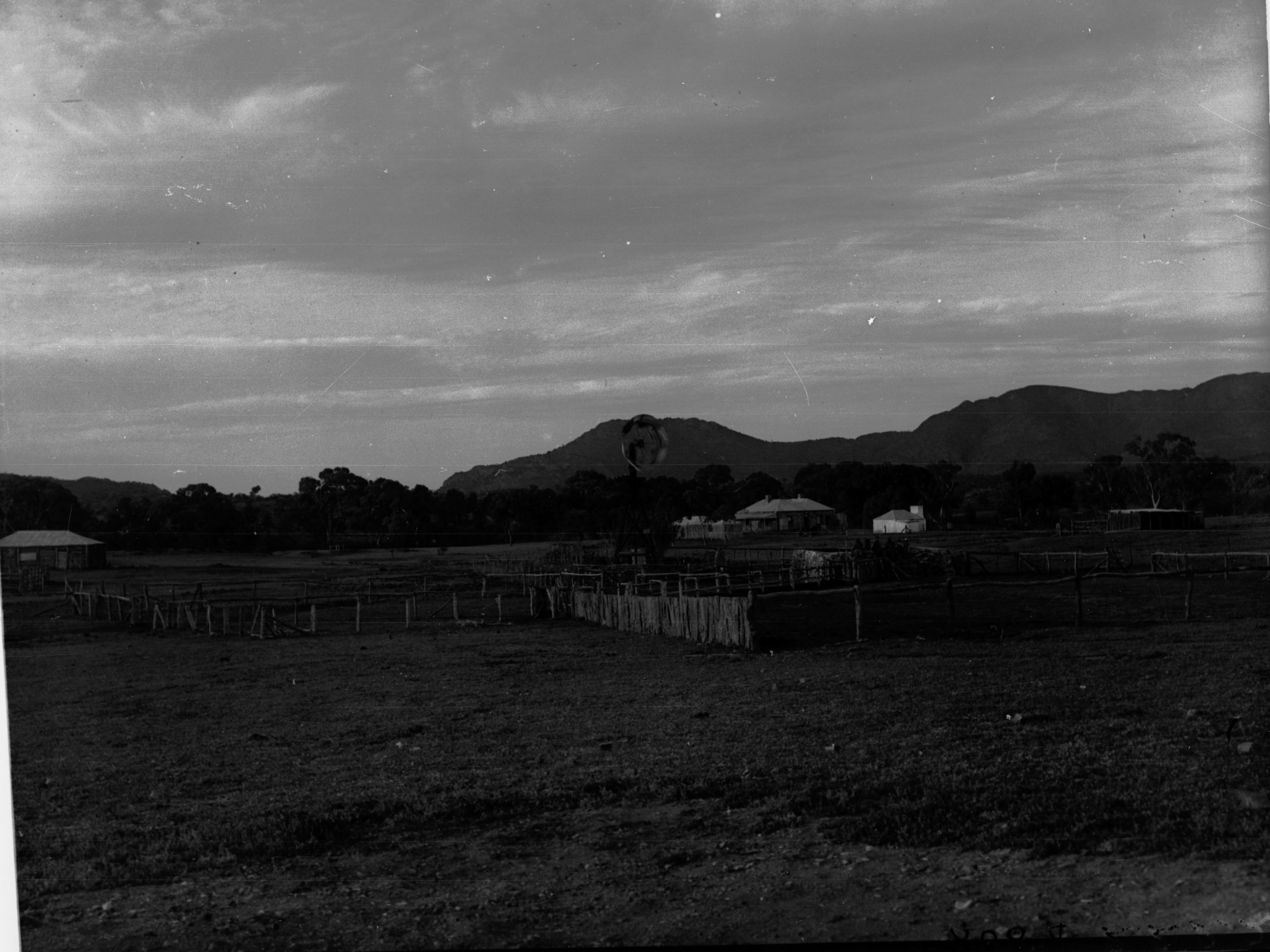
Mount Serle Camel Depot(GN10283)

In 1884 T.W. Scott managed the station, followed by a number of different owners, until the leases were surrendered in 1896 by a Dr Browne. At that time, the property covered around 216 mi^{2} (560 km^{2}). After being abandoned by pastoralists, from 1898 there was a fenced camel depot on the station, run by the survey department, of around 30 mi^{2} (78 km^{2}), subdivided into six paddocks. The old homestead of the Mount Serle Station acted as the headquarters of the camel station, and consisted of "a splendid four-roomed house, substantially built of stone, a stone woolshed, men's quarters and numerous buildings, besides very large cattle and sheep yards". Depot caretaker Mr Strothers asked for the Aboriginal rations depot to be closed, wishing them to leave the land. The Protector of Aborigines refused to do so, saying that the Adnyamathanha people could not just be removed from their land.

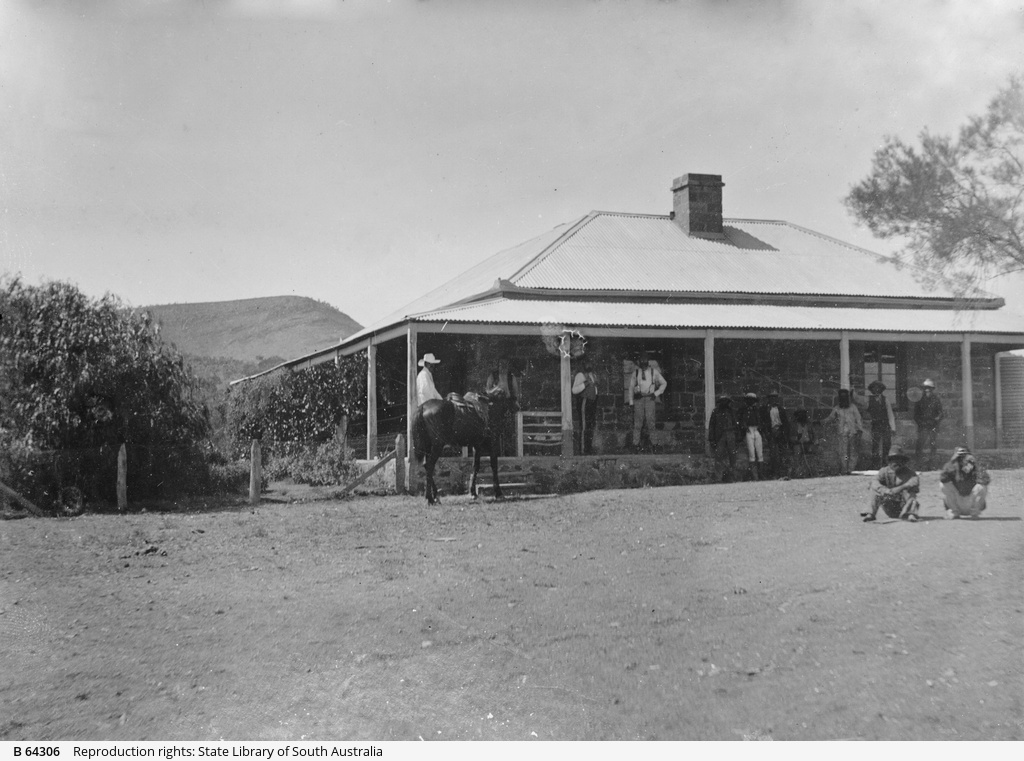
Stockmen on the verandah Mt Serle homestead, c. 1900

In 1905, there was a stock of 75 camels kept for breeding purposes, and Aboriginal stockmen were employed to handle the camels. The station was again leased from 1906, and the camels were moved to Muloorina in 1923.

The station was only 4.8 km (3 mi) from the branch road. There was a large homestead, and the outbuildings included a woolshed, blacksmiths' shop, store, and chaffhouse. The buildings were on flat ground, surrounded by a high, wooded hills. Frome River was nearby.

In 1906, the pastoral lease was taken up again. In March 1918, the camel depot was run by George Norton, "a well-known identity in the north, and also in mining circles, more particularly in connection with the old Sliding Rock Copper Mine, near Beltana, and the Bird-in-Hand gold mine in the vicinity of Woodside.

The pioneering Greenwood family were mineral prospectors and pastoralists. William Bentley "Ben" Greenwood, in 1902 owner of Umberatana pastoral lease, (Note: Note mention of a James Arthur Greenwood, miner at Yudnamutana - possibly brother of W.B.? "Ben" is mentioned in a 1936 article.) usually referred to as W. B. Greenwood, a part-time government prospector, in 1910 discovered uranium deposits at Mount Painter in the form of torbanite (first named as carnotite), identified by geologist Douglas Mawson. (Note: Note confusion between father (WB) and son (GA) Greenwood that seems to occur in several sources. W.B. also discovered corundum at Mt Painter.) In 1924 Greenwood's eldest son, Gordon Arthur "Smiler" Greenwood, who had been away doing service in World War I from 9 November 1916 until 23 June 1919, took up the lease of Mount Serle after giving up the lease of Umberatana, and also worked with his father at Mt Painter. In April 1935 G. A. Greenwood was appointed a member of the board of the "Mount Serle Vermin-Fenced District". In August of that year, he married Mary "Madge" Fuss of Fullarton, in the Methodist Church in Malvern, Adelaide. His father had died by then. In 1944 he discovered talc deposits at Mt Fitton. Sir Douglas Mawson had some correspondence with G. A. Greenwood between 1940 and 1944.

In 1914, the Aboriginal people living on the station asked for a school to be established, as there were many children of station workers being born on the station. In the early 1920s the local Adnyamathanha people were told to leave the station and camp elsewhere, although some continued to be employed at Mt Serle. A group of more than 100 then set up a semi-permanent camp at Ram Paddock Gate, where they lived until being moved to Nepabunna in 1931.

The Bishop of Willochra visited the station in 1931, and had lunch with the Greenwoods.

In 1936, pastoralists holding leases of three adjoining stations offered the Greenwood family the leasehold over the Mount Painter area on condition that get rid of "vermin", which included dingoes, along with feral rabbits, feral camels and goats. This was the most mountainous region and the worst pastoral land, on which it was difficult to raise and muster sheep. The land was amalgamated under a new lease in 1937, which became Arkaroola. As of July 1946, Bentley Greenwood, brother of Gordon, was running Arkaroola Station.

In early 1938, photographer and anthropologist Charles Mountford visited Nepabunna, afterwards publishing a series of articles in The News which related stories he had been told by various people there. The stories were illustrated by members of the community. He also used the material in his later book Flinders Ranges Dreaming.

From the mid-1940s until 1957 the station was managed by Les Kent. In 1958 Gordon Greenwood sold Mount Serle Station to James Smith for A$200.000.

== Surveying and mining ==
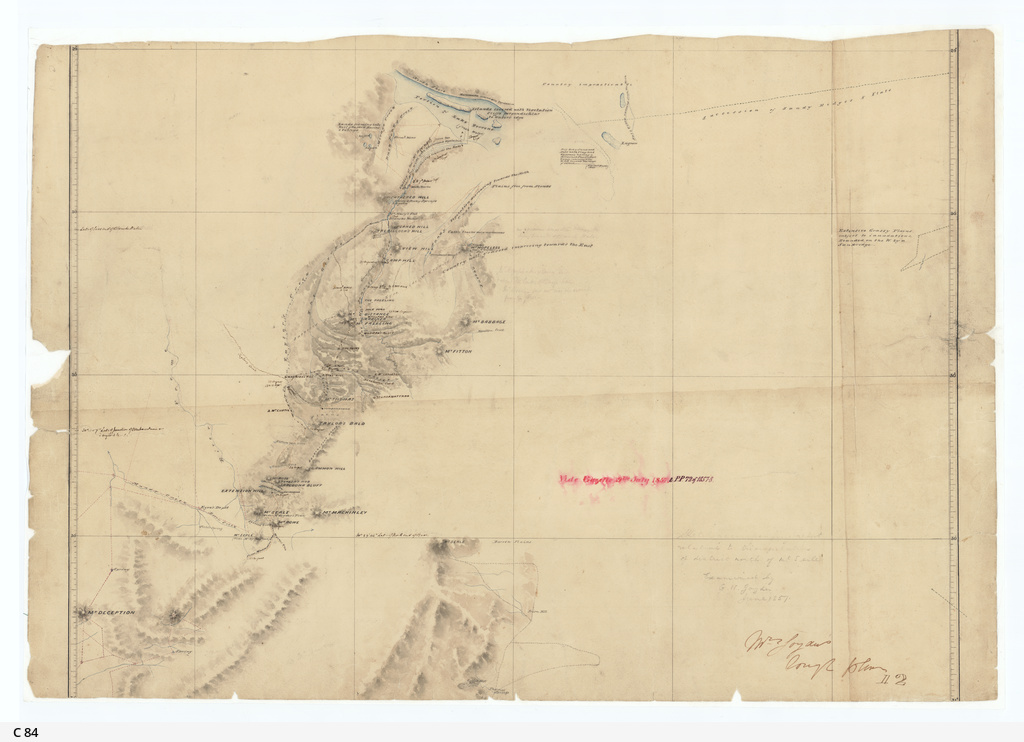
Sketch map of the district north of Mt Serle, signed G. W. Goyder

At the same time as the pastoralists moved onto land in the northern Flinders, and particularly from the 1850s, prospectors and speculators came in hopes of finding valuable minerals. There were several finds in the area, in particular deposits of copper.

On 26 September 1856 Benjamin Babbage led a small party from Mt Serle looking for gold. They found no gold, but did find an important source of permanent water, which he called Blanchewater. Charles Bonney also prospected in the area, and Mt Serle was used as a staging point for various explorers and surveyors, being the most northerly station at that time as well as the most isolated.

In 1857, the area was explored and mapped by J. M. Painter (after whom Mount Painter was named), who was succeeded by Samuel Parry late that year. Both men worked for Deputy Surveyor-General G. W. Goyder, who also travelled to Mt Serle in that year. In 1859, Governor MacDonnell visited the property.

In 1860, a weekly mail and passenger service operated between Mount Remarkable and Mount Serle, but in 1963 severe drought caused the closure of most of the mines in the Northern Flinders area, including Yudnamutana. The drought lasted for three years.

In August 1884 Government Geologist Henry Yorke Lyell Brown visited Mt Serle and various mines in the area, spending some weeks collecting information to create a new geological map. Not long afterwards, some silver-containing galena was found, and more prospectors arrived to look for silver. Companies such as the Great Comstock Silver Mining Company and the Imperial Mint Silver Mining Company explored at Mount Serle, but the finds were disappointing.

Several mines have been worked on the property over the years, such as Mount Burr Mine and Rose Hill Mine (also called Mount Rose).

== Today ==
The station has been destocked, with the last of the non-native animals, feral goats, being eradicated over some years. Wildlife such as kangaroos, wallabies, emus, and other birds are abundant. The area is good for hiking, and there are maps that cover various routes. Guided walks are available.

The property is a Pastoral Unincorporated Area.
