= Henry Yorke Lyell Brown =

Australian geologist

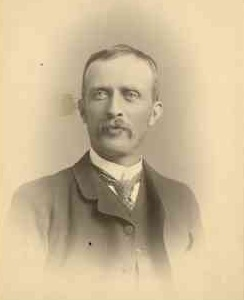
c. 1900

Henry Yorke Lyell Brown FGS (23 August 1843 – 22 January 1928) was an Australian geologist, who worked in Western Australia and South Australia.

== Early life and education ==
Brown was born on 23 August 1843 at Sydney Mines, Nova Scotia, Canada, the son of Richard Brown, also a geologist, and his wife Sibella, née Barrington.

He was educated at King's College in Windsor, Nova Scotia, and matriculated in 1862. He then studied under T. H. Huxley and John Tyndall at the Royal School of Mines (Imperial College), London, in 1863–64.

== Career ==
Brown came to Australia in 1865 and worked on the Geological Survey of Victoria under Alfred Selwyn until 1869.

Brown was government geologist in Western Australia in 1870–72. He discovered the Weld Range, drilled the first artesian bore near Perth, and forecast accurately that the colony's mineral resources would eventually become a main source of its advance. In 1872 he worked in private mining in Victoria and New Zealand and two years later rejoined Selwyn in Canada. Finding the climate too severe, he returned to Australia to work for the New South Wales government in 1881–82.

In December 1882 Brown became, at twice his previous salary, government geologist of South Australia. He made the first recorded observations of much of the hot, arid interior, often travelling alone but for an "Afghan" camel-driver or Aboriginal guide, under harsh conditions. In 1883 he journeyed to the far north-eastern corner of the colony and in 1885 to Silverton and from Port Augusta to Eucla and back. He went to the Musgrave Ranges in 1889, and through the Lake Eyre region in 1892. His longest journey was made through the Northern Territory from north to south in 1894.

He explored the MacDonnell Ranges in 1888, 1890 and 1896 and the country to the north of the Nullarbor Plain in 1897, and in 1905 journeyed to Charlotte Waters, near the SA border, and to the north-west of the Northern Territory. In 1907 he went from Van Diemen Gulf to the McArthur River. On Brown's last major trip in 1909 he assessed the Tanami goldfield. His written reports of these explorations were minimal; mostly he recorded the results on maps. He had achieved a major objective with the production of a geological map of the whole colony in 1899. At this time Brown was described by The Critic as "noted for his Bohemian habits and dry humour".

Pastoralist and prospector W. B. Greenwood (Note: Note confusion between father (William Bentley) and son (Gordon Arthur) Greenwood that seems to occur in several sources.) sent rocks that he had found near Mount Painter in the northern Flinders Ranges to the government for analysis in 1899, a year after radium had been discovered by Marie and Pierre Curie in France. However, Brown was away on leave when the specimens arrived, and they subsequently went missing. In October/November 1910 Greenwood once again sent rocks in, but Brown was dismissive of their value. Douglas Mawson, then a lecturer University of Adelaide, identified the mineral torbernite, a secondary mineral that occurs in uranium-bearing rocks. This led to significant mining in the Mount Painter area.

In 1887 and 1890 Brown published records of the mines of South Australia to draw attention to mineral resources and to the unsystematic way in which they were worked. He criticised the licence laws as unfair to genuine prospectors and called for a school of mines. He always worded his reports on sensational "discoveries" carefully so that "rarely was it possible to ... exaggerate a good impression into a glowing opinion".

== Later life and death ==
In 1911 Brown resigned, took six months leave and married a New Zealander, Hannah M. Thompson. He continued to act as an honorary consultant to the Department of Mines in Adelaide until his death. This lithe 'little brown man with a hammer in his hand' had stimulated gold-mining and the copper industry in the State, charted the limits of artesian water in central Australia and discovered natural outlets for the disposal of flood waters in the south-east. At his death in Adelaide on 22 January 1928 it was said that "he knew every mineral belt from Darwin to Mount Gambier". He was survived by his wife and only daughter.

== Other activities and legacy ==
He was a founding member of the Australasian Association for the Advancement of Science in 1888, and of the Australasian Institute of Mining Engineers in 1893.

Brown's works include the cataloguing of the geological specimens collected on the William Henry Tietkins expedition to central Australia.

The State Library of South Australia holds a collection of photographs taken by Brown, which includes several of Charlotte Waters dated c. 1880.

Brown's maps contained more than geological information: his annotations included descriptions of the environment, flora and fauna, water resources and ethnographic information concerning the local Indigenous peoples. His works also extended to palaeontology, making collections that included a large and extinct mammal, a diprotodont, and reptilian Megalania, obtained to the northeast of Lake Eyre.
