= Arkaroola =

Wilderness sanctuary in South Australia

- Town

- Coordinates: 30°18′42″S 139°20′10″E
- Country: Australia
- State: South Australia
- Location: 700 km (430 mi) from Adelaide city centre

Government
  - State electorate: Stuart
  - Federal division: Grey

Population
  - Total: 32 (SAL 2021)
- Mean max temp: 25.7 °C (78.3 °F)
- Mean min temp: 11.6 °C (52.9 °F)
- Annual rainfall: 254.3 mm (10.01 in)

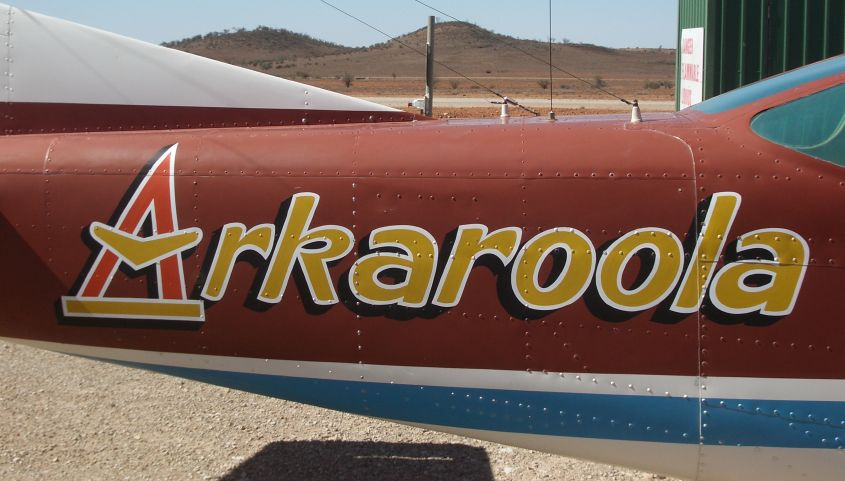
Arkaroola plane

Arkaroola Wilderness Sanctuary, commonly known simply as Arkaroola, is a wildlife sanctuary situated on 610 square kilometres (240 square miles) of freehold and pastoral lease land in South Australia. It is located 700 kilometres (430 miles) north of the Adelaide city centre in the Northern Flinders Ranges, adjacent to the Vulkathunha-Gammon Ranges National Park and the Mawson Plateau. The usual way to get there is by car, but air travel can be chartered from Parafield Airport, Adelaide Airport or Aldinga Airfield. It was used as a location set for the 2002 film The Tracker.

== History ==
The area's first people are the Adnyamathanha. One of their Dreaming or creation stories says that Arkaroo, a mythical monster, drank Lake Frome dry. He then crawled up into the mountains. When he urinated he created the waterholes that are a feature of the area. His movement over the land created Arkaroola Creek.

The first Anglo-Europeans to visit the area was explorer Edward Eyre in 1840 and the surveyor George Goyder in 1857. There was a small failed settlement nearby, at the Yudnamutana copper mine, from 1860 to 1863. The drought of 1863 drove the miners away. Settlement didn't occur again until 1903, when rubies and sapphires were discovered. By 1910 a copper smelter was built at Yudnamutana and uranium was also discovered nearby by Douglas Mawson, famous Antarctic explorer.

The land was always marginal for white pastoralism or agriculture and projects failed quickly. The pioneering Greenwood family were mineral prospectors and pastoralists in the area. William Bentley Greenwood was the owner of the nearby Umberatana pastoral lease in 1902, and in 1910 discovered uranium deposits at Mount Painter in the form of torbanite, identified by geologist Douglas Mawson. His son, Gordon Arthur Greenwood, took up the lease of Mount Serle after giving up the lease of Umberatana, and worked with his father at Mt Painter. In 1936, pastoralists holding leases of three adjoining stations offered the Greenwood family the leasehold over the Mount Painter area on the condition that they would get rid of "vermin", which included dingoes, along with feral rabbits, feral camels and goats. This was the most mountainous region and the worst pastoral land, on which it was difficult to raise and muster sheep. The land was amalgamated under a new lease in 1937, which became Arkaroola. As of July 1946, Bentley Greenwood, brother of Gordon, was running Arkaroola Station.

Uranium exploration persisted sporadically and led to the development of good roads by optimistic companies.

The Arkaroola Wilderness Sanctuary was established by geologist Reg Sprigg in 1968 after he purchased the pastoral lease. He had been involved in surveys in the area before that. He purchased the 610 square kilometres (240 square miles) pastoral lease (part of which is now held as freehold) and began the conversion to a wildlife sanctuary. In 1979 he was a trustee of the World Wildlife Fund due to his work in the protection of the yellow-footed rock-wallaby.

=== Mining threat ===
Until mid-2011, Arkaroola was under threat from uranium mining; the Adelaide-based mining company Marathon Resources had been prospecting the area around Mount Gee. In 2008, Marathon was found guilty of illegally dumping radioactive waste in a variety of locations throughout the Arkaroola Wilderness Sanctuary, and were ordered to suspend drilling operations. In late 2010, the government renewed the company's mineral exploration license, allowing it to resume exploratory drilling within the protected area, a decision which resulted in public outcry. A poll taken in February 2011 showed that 72 per cent of South Australians, and 79 per cent of Labor voters, were opposed to mining in Arkaroola. Following unprecedented public pressure, the South Australian Government announced on 22 July 2011 that mining would be banned forever in Arkaroola, with the aim of national and World Heritage listing. Mining companies have since threatened legal action against the government.

=== Protection ===
In July 2011 South Australian Premier Mike Rann announced a ban on mining in Arkaroola. This was followed in October 2011 by special purpose legislation prohibiting mining, mining exploration and grazing in the ranges. Protection of Arkaroola from mining, including Mount Gee and the Mount Painter inlier, is provided by the Arkaroola Protection Act 2012, which created the Arkaroola Protection Area.

The South Australian Government also moved to nominate the Arkaroola area for listing on the National Heritage list, and to secure its nomination for World Heritage listing. Arkaroola was listed on the South Australian Heritage Register on 27 July 2012.

In July 2023, Arkaroola became South Australia's first International Dark Sky Sanctuary, and only the second in Australia.

== Geographical features ==
=== Paralana radioactive springs ===
Paralana geothermal springs are located on Wooltana.

Local granite rocks contain elevated levels of uranium that gives off heat during radioactive decay. Water percolating through fractures in the rock is heated and bubbles out at the surface as a hot spring, with gases such as carbon dioxide, nitrogen, radon, and helium. Due to the presence of radon gas, which is heavier than air, staying near the springs for a prolonged period may constitute a health hazard. Living on the floor of the springs is an extremophile algal mat that survives the warm temperatures of 62 °C and high radioactivity.

== Birds ==
Arkaroola is part of the 1,890 square kilometres (730 square miles) Gammon Ranges and Arkaroola Important Bird Area (IBA), identified as such by BirdLife International because it supports a population of the restricted-range short-tailed grasswren as well as populations of the pied honeyeater, chirruping wedgebill, and cinnamon quail-thrush.

== Tourist activities ==
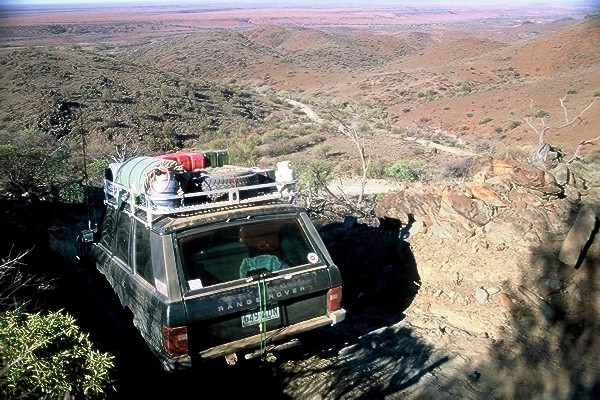
4WD Touring on the Echo Camp Backtrack- Arkaroola

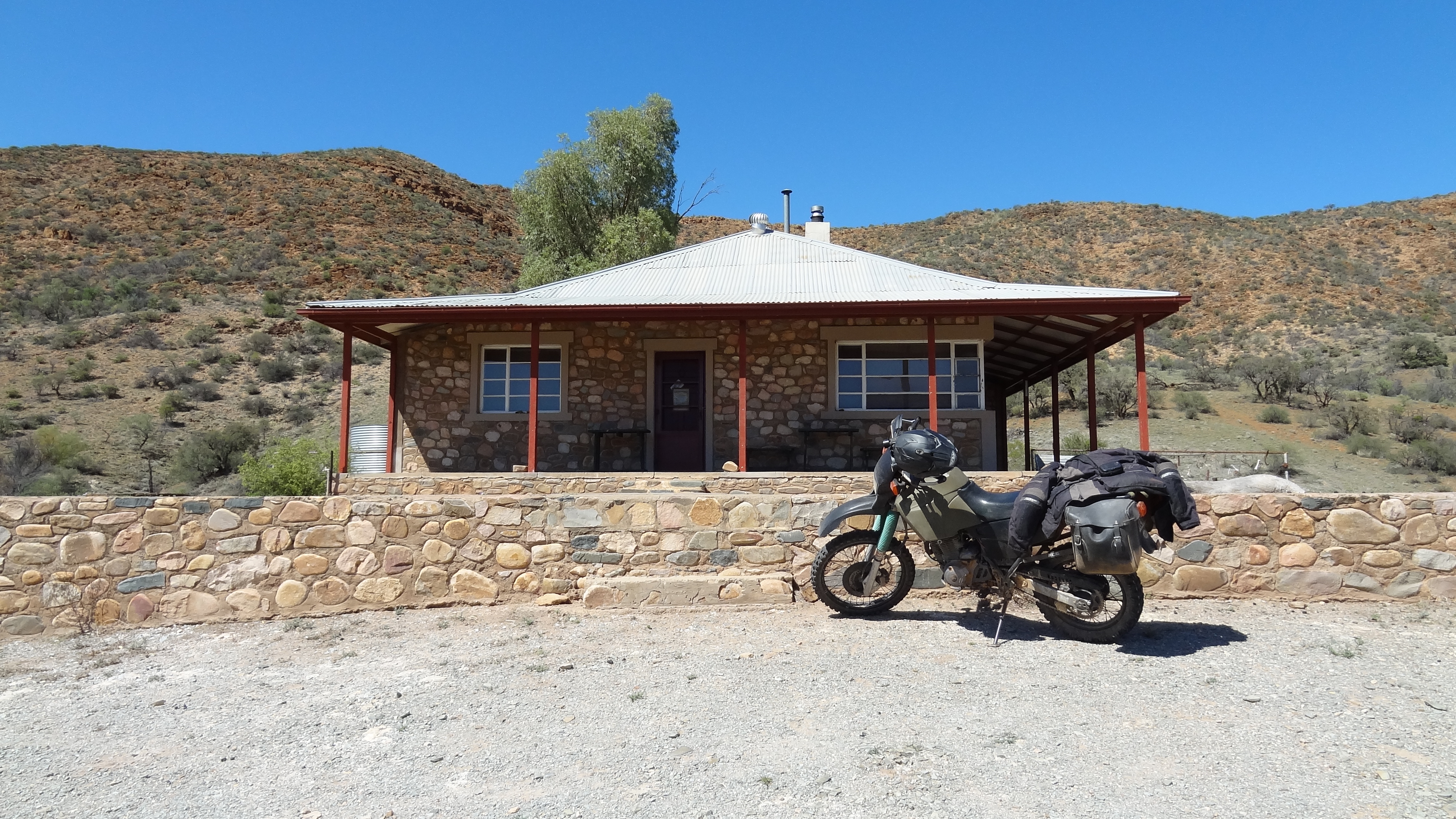
Typical lodgings

=== Road loops and 4WD tracks ===
There are self-drive and organised tour tracks for 2-wheel drives and 4-wheel drives, ranging from beginner to advanced in difficulty.

The Echo Camp Backtrack self-drive track leads through some wonderful country and then over the hills (rough) and down onto the plains east of the Flinders Ranges. This joins another track back to Arkaroola via Claude's Pass, Stubb's Waterhole, Bararranna Gorge (an area where yellow-footed rock wallabies are commonly found), Welcome Pound and back to the main road to the Arkaroola Village.

Organised tours provide trips along the ridge top track with three lookouts that end at Siller's Lookout, providing a view across the plains towards Lake Frome and the Beverley Uranium Mine. Siller's Lookout is named after Bill Siller, whose uranium exploration companies constructed the Ridge Top Tour track in the late 1960s. Beverley Uranium Mine, also discovered by Bill Siller's companies, is named after his wife, Beverley. The track was put in by Jim Hodgekinson, an expatriate Canadian.

=== Bushwalking ===
There are a number of walking trails available, guided and self-guided. Some are marked and described by the Royal Geographical Society of South Australia.

- Spriggina Trail (1 to 1.5 hrs)
- Bararranna Gorge Walk (6.8 km – 3.5 hrs)
- Acacia Ridge (4 to 5 hrs)
- Surveyor's Cairn (40 mins)
- Griselda Hill (1.5 hrs) (Note: Named after Reg Sprigg's wife and co-founder of the Sanctuary, Griselda Sprigg.)
- Mawson Valley Trail (2.5 to 3 hrs)
- Arkaroola Waterhole (4 hrs)
- Oppaminda Trail (length depends on starting point)

Coloured leaflets about some of these trails at Arkaroola and throughout the Flinders Ranges are available for download from the Walking Trails Support Group.

=== Astronomy ===
Arkaroola has three observatories, the latest built in 2019, along with several telescopes. Live shots are shown on a big screen every night, along with a presentation by astronomer Alex Hine. As an International Dark Sky Sanctuary, this feature attracts many tourists.

=== Accommodation ===
Accommodation in Arkarooola Tourist Village ranges from motel rooms to caravan and camp sites. Facilities include a licensed restaurant and bar, swimming pool, small shop, service station, and a vehicle workshop.

== Climate ==
The Arkaroola area is classified as having a subtropical desert climate (BWh) according to the Köppen, Trewartha, and Australian Bureau of Meteorology climate classification systems. Summers are hot with occasional storms, while winters are cold and comparatively dry.

Arkaroola's record high minimum temperature is 35.5 °C (95.9 °F), which was the hottest overnight low ever recorded in Australia (as well as Oceania and the Southern Hemisphere) from when it was recorded on 24 January 1982 until it was beaten by a 35.9 °C (96.6 °F) reading in Noona, New South Wales on 18 January 2019 followed by 36.6 °C (97.9 °F) at Borrona Downs Station near Wanaaring, New South Wales on 26 January 2019, which retains the titles as of present.

Climate data for Arkaroola (1991–2020 normals, 1977–present temperature extremes)
Month	Jan	Feb	Mar	Apr	May	Jun	Jul	Aug	Sep	Oct	Nov	Dec	Year
Record high °C (°F)	45.9 (114.6)	44.5 (112.1)	41.2 (106.2)	37.9 (100.2)	30.0 (86.0)	27.7 (81.9)	27.0 (80.6)	32.6 (90.7)	37.5 (99.5)	40.1 (104.2)	44.5 (112.1)	45.5 (113.9)	45.9 (114.6)
Mean daily maximum °C (°F)	35.0 (95.0)	33.4 (92.1)	30.2 (86.4)	25.6 (78.1)	20.5 (68.9)	17.1 (62.8)	17.1 (62.8)	19.3 (66.7)	23.8 (74.8)	27.3 (81.1)	30.5 (86.9)	32.9 (91.2)	26.1 (78.9)
Mean daily minimum °C (°F)	20.7 (69.3)	19.6 (67.3)	16.0 (60.8)	11.3 (52.3)	7.0 (44.6)	4.5 (40.1)	3.2 (37.8)	4.7 (40.5)	8.2 (46.8)	11.6 (52.9)	15.7 (60.3)	18.1 (64.6)	11.7 (53.1)
Record low °C (°F)	10.4 (50.7)	9.4 (48.9)	0.0 (32.0)	1.0 (33.8)	−2.0 (28.4)	−5.4 (22.3)	−6.0 (21.2)	−4.3 (24.3)	−1.6 (29.1)	1.0 (33.8)	4.6 (40.3)	7.3 (45.1)	−6.0 (21.2)
Average rainfall mm (inches)	29.4 (1.16)	38.4 (1.51)	17.4 (0.69)	10.4 (0.41)	13.9 (0.55)	15.8 (0.62)	14.5 (0.57)	11.6 (0.46)	14.4 (0.57)	21.7 (0.85)	21.2 (0.83)	28.2 (1.11)	236.9 (9.33)
Average rainy days (≥ 0.2mm)	3.2	2.9	2.4	2.4	2.9	3.3	3.5	3.3	2.9	3.2	3.0	3.0	36
Source: Bureau of Meteorology
