= Vulkathunha-Gammon Ranges National Park =

National park in South Australia

- IUCN category II (national park)
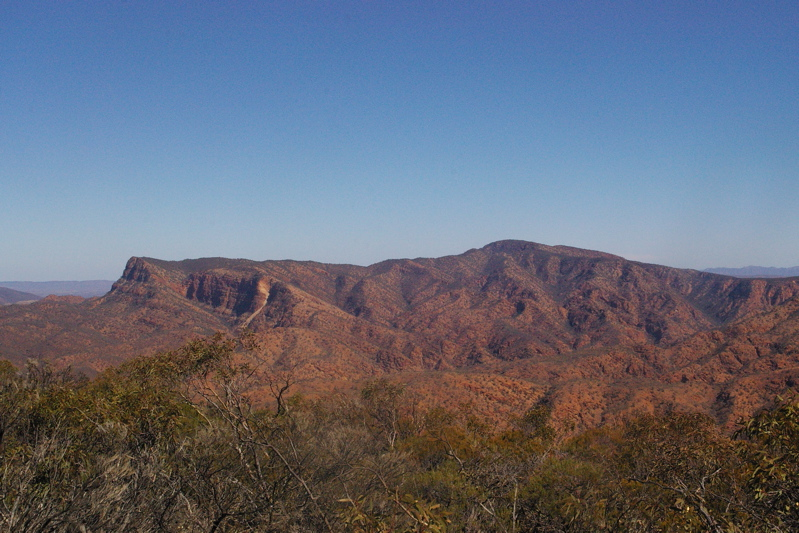
- Mount McKinlay from the north

- Location within South Australia
- Location: South Australia
- Nearest city: Leigh Creek
- Coordinates: 30°26′50″S 139°16′38″E
- Area: 1,257.23 km^{2} (485.42 sq mi)
- Established: 1 January 1970
- Governing body: Department for Environment and Water
- Website: Official website

The Vulkathunha-Gammon Ranges National Park is a protected area in the Flinders Ranges of South Australia, immediately south-west of and adjacent to the Arkaroola Protection Area. The ranges encompass some of the most rugged and spectacular country in South Australia. Benbonyathe Hill, located on "The Plateau", is at 1,064 m (3,491 ft) the second highest point in the Flinders north of Wilpena Pound after Mount Hack. There are also several major mountains on the edge of the Gammon Ranges, two of which are actually higher the main range: Gammon Hill in the north, and Mount McKinlay dominating the south. The national park, declared in 1970, encompasses the former pastoral leases of Yankaninna and Balcanoona stations. Balcanoona Airport is within the park.

Vulkathunha-Gammon Ranges National Park is part of the Flinders Ranges geological successions, where abundant and diverse arrays of fossils show how animal life began on Earth over a period of 350 million years. These areas were submitted to the UNESCO World Heritage Centre for consideration as a World Heritage Site in April 2021, and as of August 2025 remain on the tentative list.

== History ==
The local Aboriginal people are the Adnyamathanha. The current generation live largely on the neighbouring station of Mount Serle and Aboriginal lands at Nepabunna and Nantawarrina. The national park is managed under a co-operative system which involves Adnyamathanha people in its operation. Also included in the national park is a wide strip of territory running 40 km (25 mi) from the edge of the ranges to the shores of Lake Frome, an area which is used by the local Aboriginal people for hunting kangaroos and emus. Curiously, regarding the mining controversies attendant with the national park (see below), this area of the national park is traversed by the Moomba Adelaide Pipeline System gas pipeline.

The first European to see the ranges was probably Edward Eyre on his 1840 expedition along the western side of the Flinders Ranges. Attempting to find a way through the salt lakes that he thought barred the path to the north, he climbed Mount Serle; in his published expedition journal, he wrote that "to the north-east, the view was obstructed by a high range immediately in front of us". This high range was the southern and western heights of the Gammons.

The next explorer to reach the area was the Surveyor General, Edward Charles Frome, on his second expedition up the eastern side of the Flinders three years later. After finding his route to the east blocked by the lake which would later bear his name, he headed for the highest point in the ranges he could see, which he thought was Eyre's Mount Serle: however, his paintings show it to be Mount McKinlay (named fifteen years later after John McKinlay, a local who became famous for leading one of several rescue expeditions for Burke and Wills in 1861).

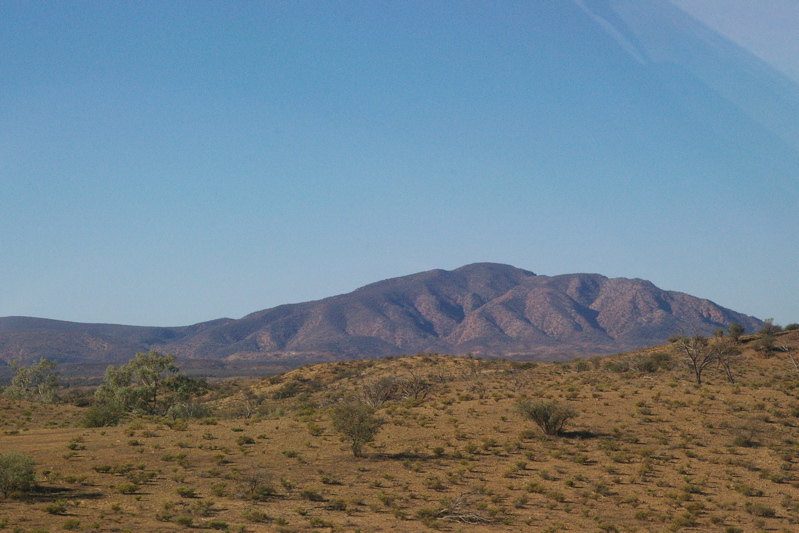
Mount McKinlay from the south

A private surveyor, J. M. Painter (after which Mount Painter was named), was employed in a survey of the area in 1857 (in the company of George Goyder). His party climbed Gammon Hill and Mount McKinlay (which Frome did not), but didn't penetrate to the peaks of the central range or plateau. One of several survey cairns built on a line they surveyed between Mount Rowe and Arcoona Bluff on the western edge of the ranges has been restored and can be visited today.

The area has a colourful history of pastoral settlement dating from the turn of the century: the now-restored holiday cottage Grindell's Hut in Illinawortina Pound is named after John Grindell, who ran a small cattle station in the pound in the early part of the twentieth century. Grindell had a difficult relationship with his son-in-law George Snell, who ran the neighbouring Yankaninna station, suspecting him of rustling cattle. When Snell disappeared in August 1918, and a search party found remains at a campfire in the ranges, Grindell was arrested and charged with Snell's murder. Despite the evidence being flimsy, Grindell was convicted at Port Augusta in December and sentenced to death, though it was later commuted to life imprisonment. He was released from prison in 1928, dying two years later at the age of 77. A restored building at the site of his old hut is now rented out as a holiday cottage.

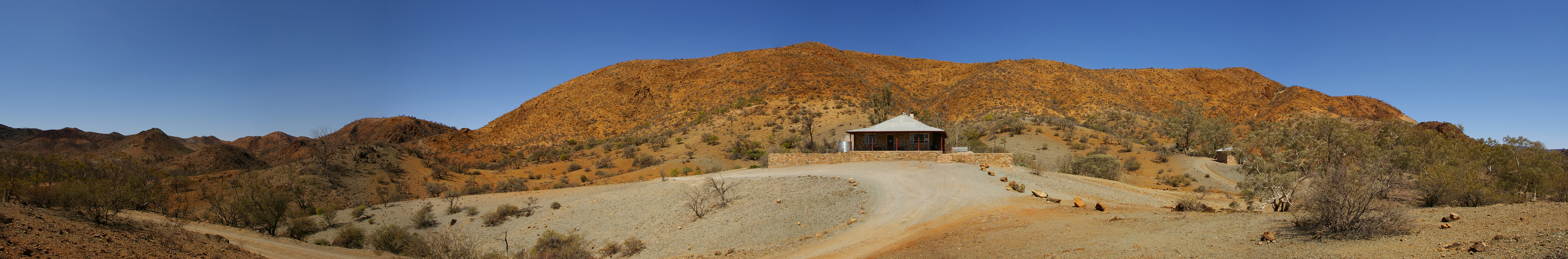
Panorama showing Grindell's Hut and surrounding landscape

The bushman R. M. Williams is reputed to have learnt everything he knew about boot-making and leather from another man he met while camped in Italowie Gap at the southern end of the ranges; he later became a millionaire and a renowned clothing brand carries his name.

The ranges were explored more thoroughly in the first half of the 20th century: the Greenwood family, pastoralists in the area, had explored the edges in the twenties and thirties, discovering Fern Chasm, but it was not until expeditions by Warren Bonython and others in the late 1940s that the Plateau and main central ranges were investigated and explored. On Bonython's first journey onto the Blue Range in 1946 several kilometres south of Benbonyathe Hill, one of his two companions, Bob Crocker, slipped and broke his leg, which resulted in Bonython walking more than twenty kilometres to Balcanoona station to organise a rescue effort: in the end Bob was carried off the 3,000-foot (910 m) high range by improvised stretcher in a seven-hour marathon.

By 1948 the Plateau had been traversed in all directions, although the highest parts of the ranges are still out of limits for all but experienced bushwalkers.

In the 1960s a group of American astronomers became interested in the higher peaks of the Gammons as possible sites for an observatory, and several parties camped for some time on the summits of Mount McKinlay and Benbonyathe Hill (vehicle tracks were also graded to the summits), but nothing further was done (a large observatory is located at Arkaroola, about a hundred kilometres to the northeast). Relics from these camps remain on the summits of the two hills, and there is reportedly still an overgrown vehicle track along the top of the Blue Range in places.

A historic former mining site, the Bolla Bollana Brick Kiln and Copper Smelter Ruins, lies within the national park and is listed on the South Australian Heritage Register. The mine had only successfully operated for three years in the 1870s.

== Nomenclature ==
The Aboriginal name for the area is Arkaroo, the name of a legendary great snake. Arkaroo is reputed to have drunk up all the water in Lake Frome, but, upset by its saltiness, he wriggled into the depths of the ranges, where his upset stomach continues to rumble to this day. The booming noises which are heard in the ranges today are thought to either be wind whistling through the narrow gorges or (more probably) large rockfalls. Arkaroo is the origin of the placename Arkaroola, used in several contexts in the area, including a pastoral lease south of Wilpena).

It is not known where the name "gammon" comes from. Conservationist Warren Bonython has a number of suggestions: it might be "gammon", the verb meaning "hoax", in reference to the thick scrub on the ranges (he notes an area near Adelaide called "Humbug Scrub" as precedent). He settles for the meaning of gammon as a piece of bacon, saying that Gammon Hill does, under "certain conditions", look like a piece of bacon.

== Geography ==
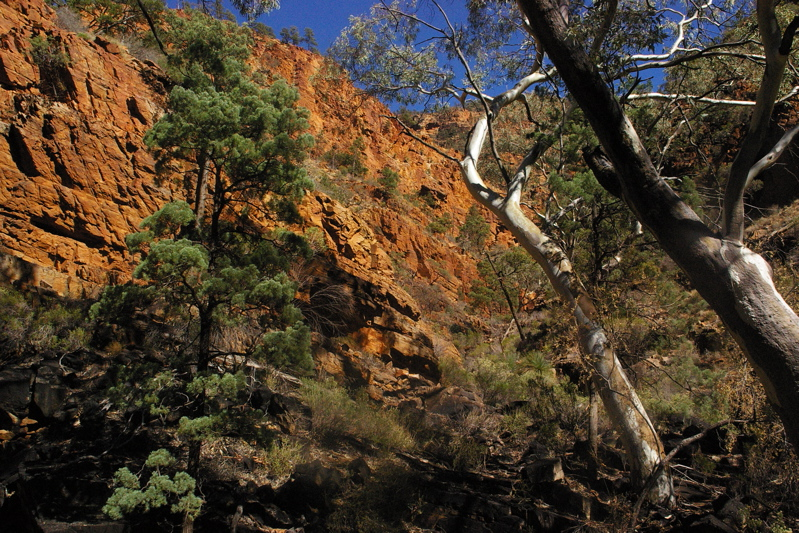
Typical Gammons gorge

The central ranges are of a different topographical nature to the rest of the Flinders, being composed of roughly flat-lying strata, creating a high plateau into which spectacular gorges have been cut, instead of the buckled and folded strata further south which lead to the ubiquitous cuestas of Wilpena Pound. The Gammons are dominated by "The Plateau" in the southwest, which is contiguous with and of much the same height as the Blue Range further northeast, culminating in Benbonyathe Hill (1,064 m (3,491 ft)), the highest point in the Flinders north of Wilpena. Other summits on the largely flat range and plateau include Elephant Hill (with adjacent outliers North Tusk and South Tusk), Mount Changeweather, Four Winds Hill, and Prow Point. Of these "rounded hills" of the plateau, Warren Bonython writes that "at their edge the slope, which was gentle near the crest, progressively steepens and then changes dramatically into a precipice plunging down to a rock-strewn creek bed perhaps a thousand feet below"

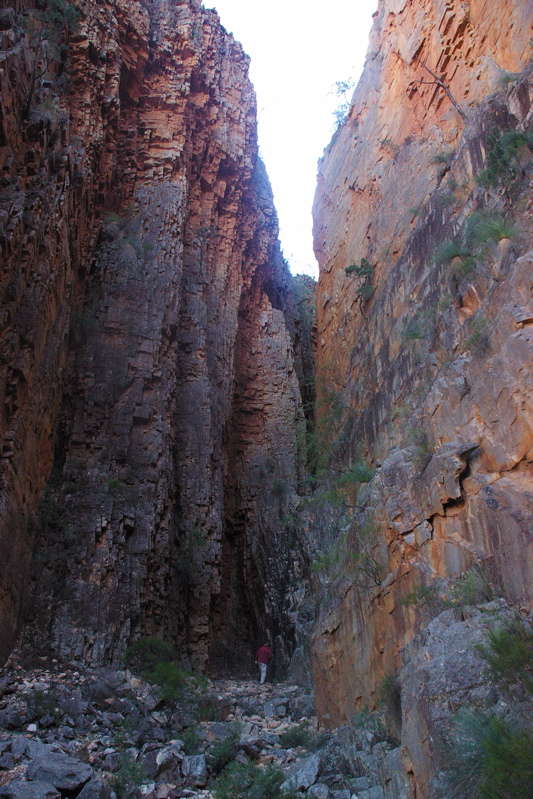
Bunyip Chasm

Some of the features of the ranges are the deep gorges cut in the south-eastern side of the Blue Range: Bunyip Chasm, The Terraces, and Fern Chasm are all areas often visited by bushwalkers. Although lower than the mountains which surround it on three sides, the dramatic Cleft Peak is also often visited, so-named for a spectacular cleft separating it into two summits, and providing opportunities for rockclimbing to a summit, not often necessary with peaks in the Flinders.

The high central range and plateau is surrounded by a number of smaller outlying ranges, creating the encircling "pounds" of low hills: Balcanoona Range encloses Illinawortina Pound to the east, Mainwater Pound is to the north, enclosed by the Yankaninna Range, and Arcoona Pound to the west. There are also several major mountains on the margin of the Gammons, two of which are actually higher the main range: Gammon Hill (1012m) in the north, overlooking Mainwater and Arcoona Pounds, and Mount McKinlay (1050m) dominating the south.

Mount McKinlay, also known as Wywyana, is an example of the Pound Quartzite Formation of Precambrian rocks. Comprising shale, siltstone, limestone, and quartzite, it is significant owing to the discovery of a very early assemblage of fossils of Ediacaran fauna. Mt McKinlay is situated northeast of Nepabunna and southwest of Grindell's Hut, a restored cottage used for visitor accommodation.

Balcanoona Airport is within the park.

== The national park ==
The area encompassed by the ranges was always pastoral land, although much of it is so inaccessible and rugged to be unattractive to anything but goats and bushwalkers. The northwestern part of the ranges was first taken into government care from the hands of the Yankaninna station in 1968, a national park being declared in 1970. Balcanoona station was purchased in 1980, and the lands officially added to the national park two years later.

The dual-usage national park (an arrangement under which some mining is permitted) has also been subject to mining claims and some controversy, not unfamiliar to the area considering the extensive uranium deposits in the adjacent Arkaroola Sanctuary. One of the most visible of the claims in the Gammons is in Weetootla Gorge, wherein a hill is composed almost entirely of magnesite; BHP had explored this area and placed a claim on it, though no plans were made to mine it. In 2000, another company made moves to acquire the claim, with view to exploiting the deposit. The government blocked the transfer of the lease, and after a legal challenge by the mining company was defeated, a commitment was made by both major political parties in South Australia to extinguish all mining claims in the area, and re-proclaim the national park with a complete ban on all mining.

The national park remains remote and relatively inaccessible. The Copley-Arkaroola dirt road (passable to 2WD vehicles) passes through Italowie Gap at the southern edge of the national park, from where it is a one-day walk north to Mount McKinlay. There is a 4WD track around Mount McTaggart into Illinawortina Pound, leading to Grindell's Hut and Loch Ness Well, from where bushwalkers may climb Mount John Roberts, an outlying bluff of the Blue Range which dominates the pound. Access to the northern side of the national park is even more difficult, with the 4WD track to the bordering pastoral station of Yankaninna providing the closest road. Visitors must climb over the Yankaninna Range or walk in from Arcoona Bluff at the extreme northwest corner of the ranges to access the interior.

Water in the ranges is sparse and difficult to rely on: there are water tanks on the outskirts at Grindell's Hut, Italowie Gap, and Arcoona Bluff. There are a number of waterholes, some of which are deep in the ranges and quite reliable, but all of them have been known to dry up in years of extreme drought.

== Fauna ==
=== Mammals ===
The national park is situated south of the dingo fence, meaning it is situated in the area where dingoes are persecuted and thus usually rare or absent. Wild dogs and foxes are poisoned regularly in the national park. Among the animals which are protected in the national park is the yellow-footed rock wallaby.

One problem plaguing the national park (as with all the Flinders) is feral goats, which are capable of traversing the rugged stony terrain, and which, thanks to the lack of predators, flourish. These introduced animals are pests due to the damage their hoofs do to the ground, and the vegetation they consume. The population in the national park has been reduced by means of hunters staking out waterholes and helicopters picking off animals on the ridge-tops: the help of the local sporting shooters' association has been employed in managing the problem. Undergrowth vegetation has improved markedly in recent years, presumably reflecting reduced numbers. Large-scale baiting programs carried out as part of Operation Bounceback have reduced the number of foxes in the national park. Rabbit numbers have declined by approximately 85% since the introduction of the rabbit calicivirus.

=== Birds ===
The Gammon Ranges and Arkaroola Important Bird Area is an area identified being important by BirdLife International because it supports a population of the restricted-range short-tailed grasswren as well as populations of the pied honeyeater, chirruping wedgebill and cinnamon quail-thrush includes the national park within its boundaries.

== World Heritage bid ==
Vulkathunha-Gammon Ranges National Park is one of a group of seven geographically separate areas that are part of the Flinders Ranges geological successions, where abundant and diverse arrays of fossils show how animal life began on Earth over a period of 350 million years. These areas were submitted to the UNESCO World Heritage Centre for consideration as a World Heritage Site under criterion (viii) on 15 April 2021, and as of August 2025 remain on the tentative list. The nomination will be voted on in 2026.

== Gallery ==
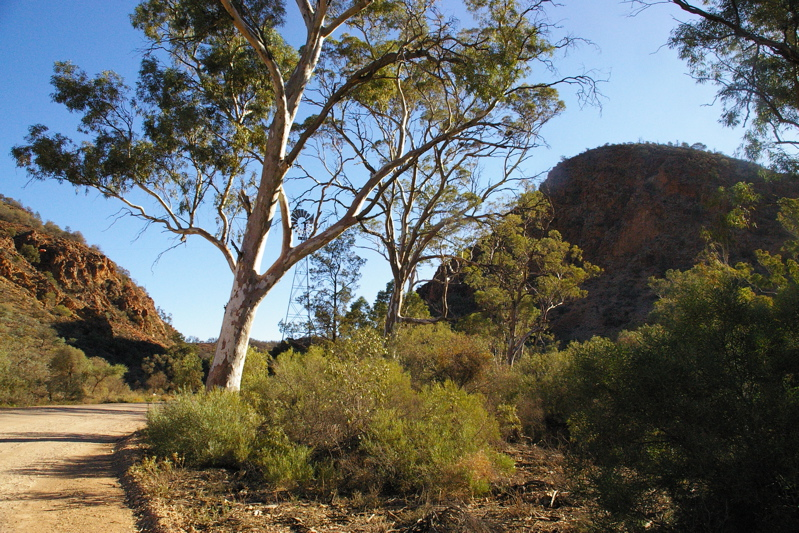
Italowie Gap

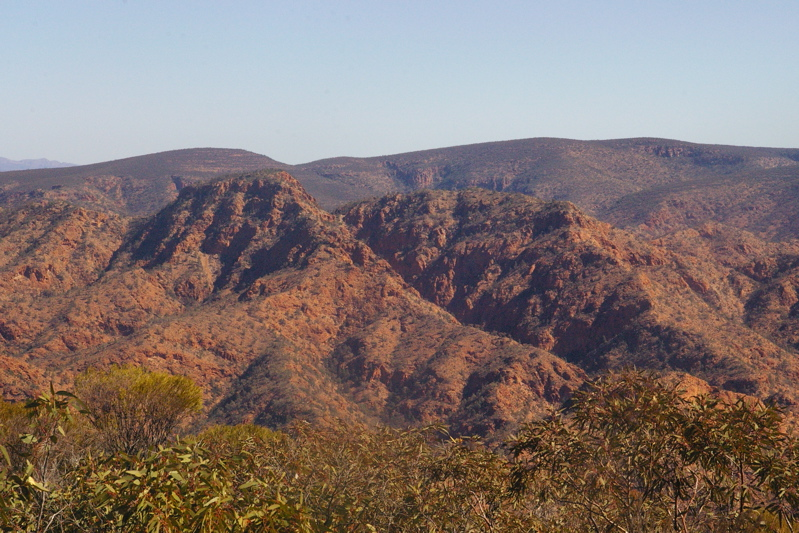
Cleft Peak

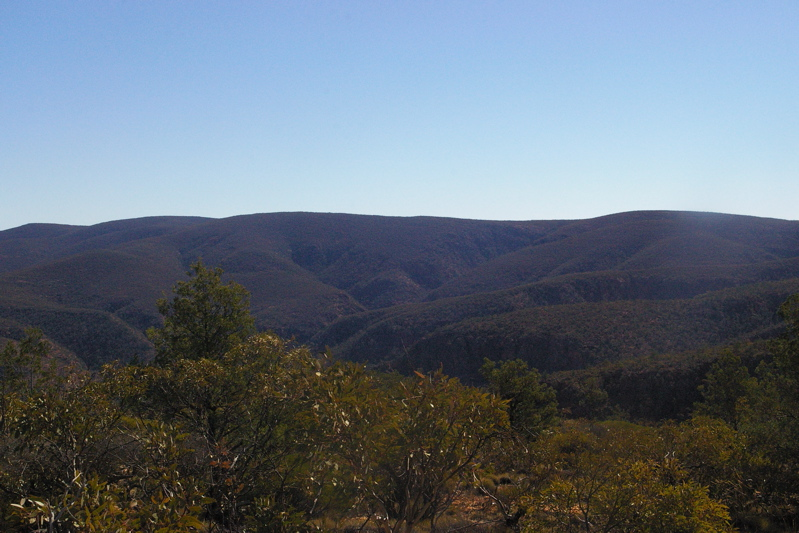
Prow Point (far right) and The Plateau (centre and left)

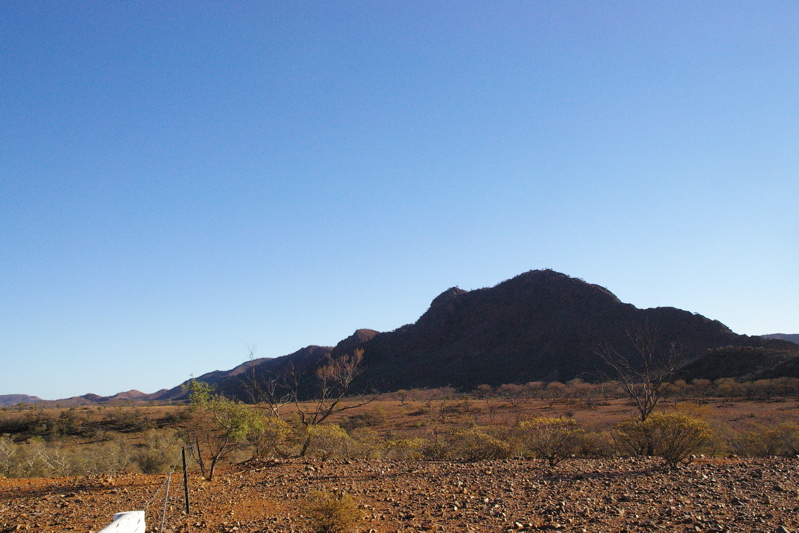
Mount McTaggart

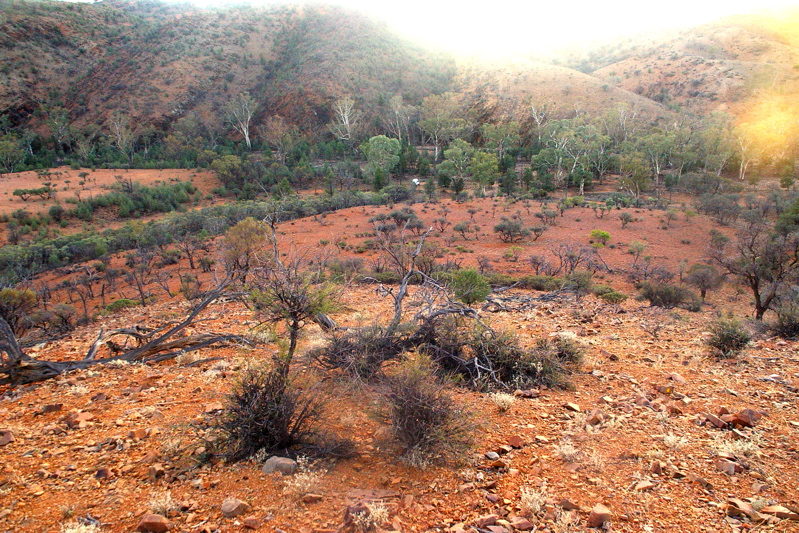
Loch Ness Well

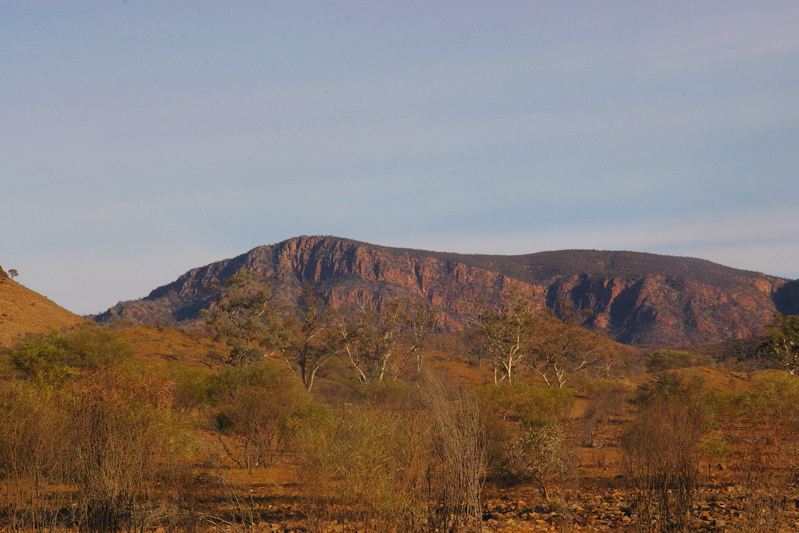
Mount John Roberts

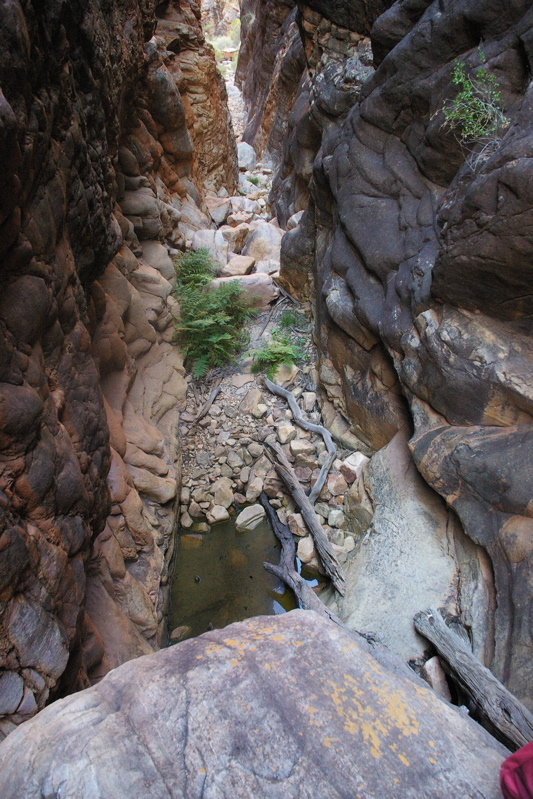
Entrance to Bunyip Chasm

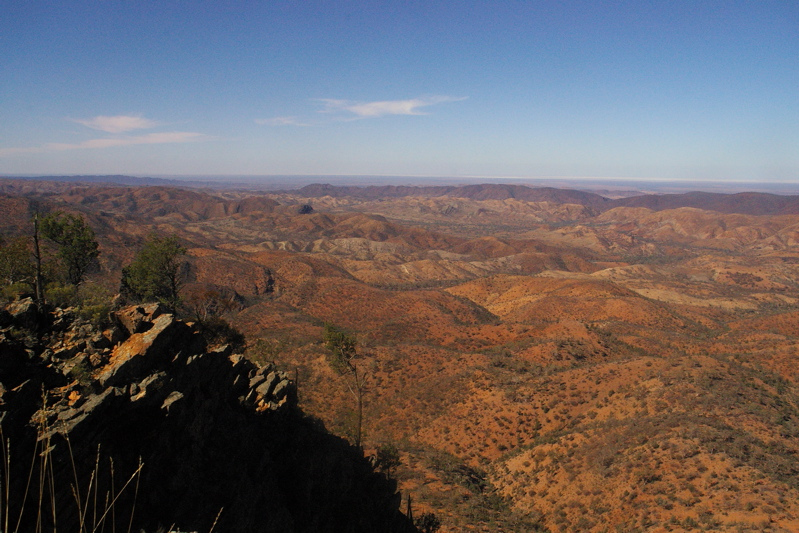
Illinawortina Pound

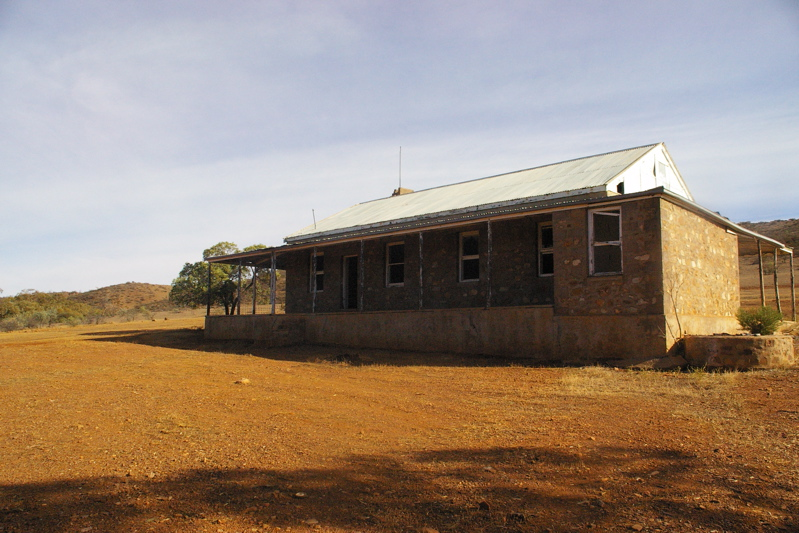
Idnina Hut (formerly Yadnina Station)

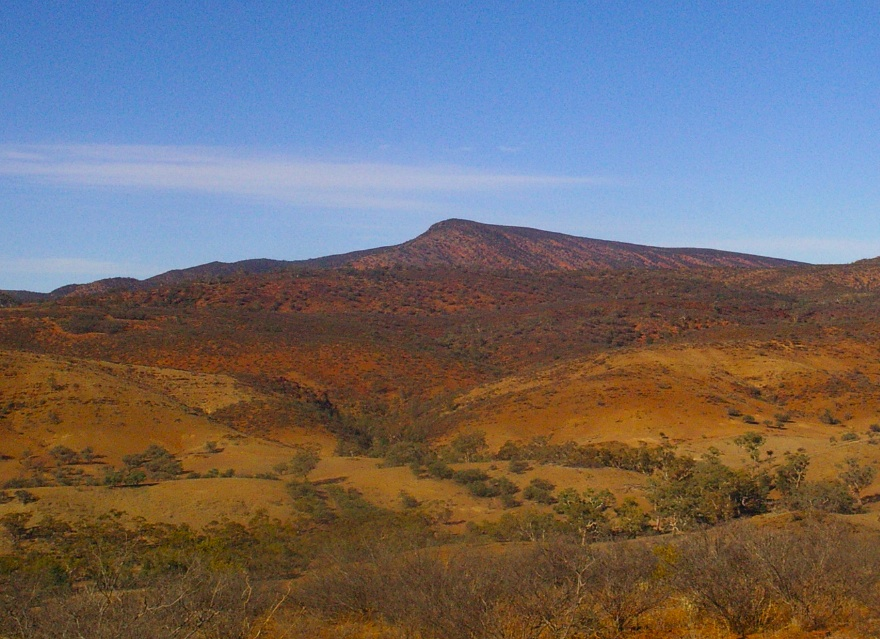
Benbonyathe Hill from Yadnina

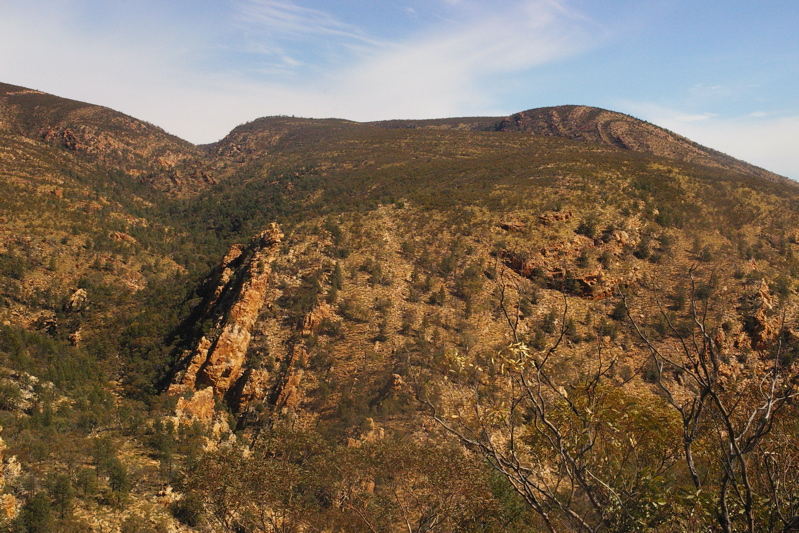
Gammon Waterfall and Gammon Hill

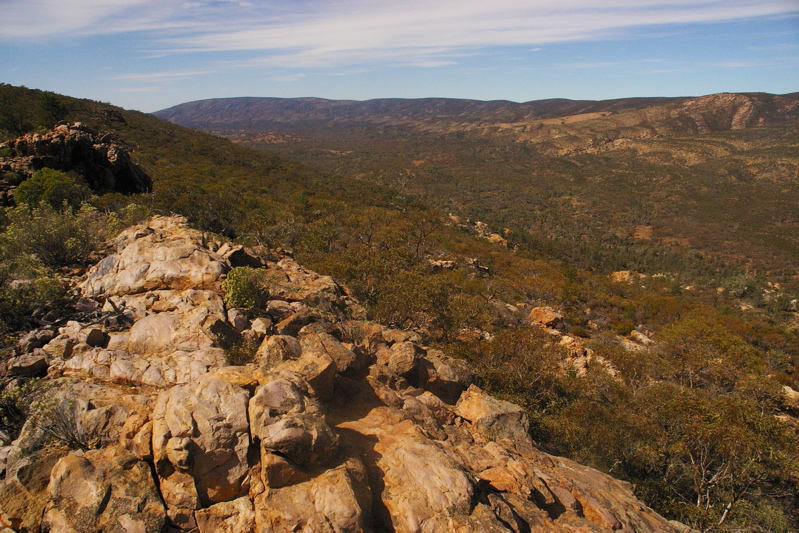
Benbonyathe Hill and Mainwater Pound

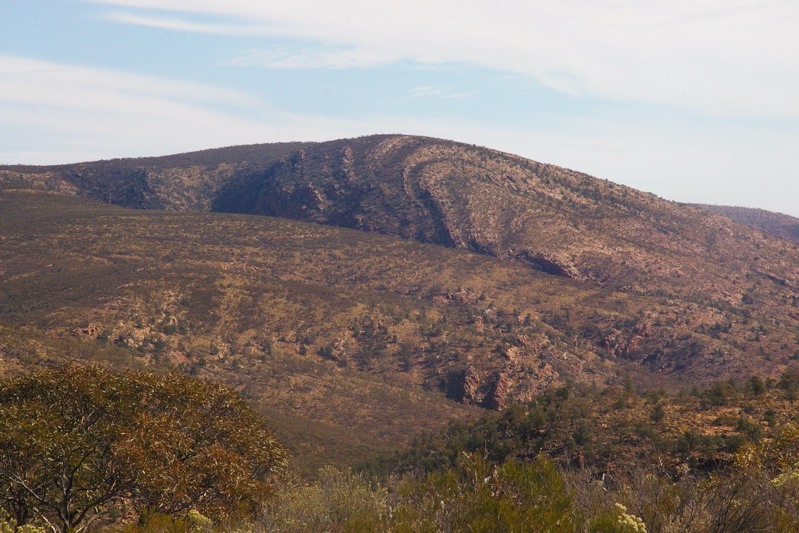
Gammon Hill

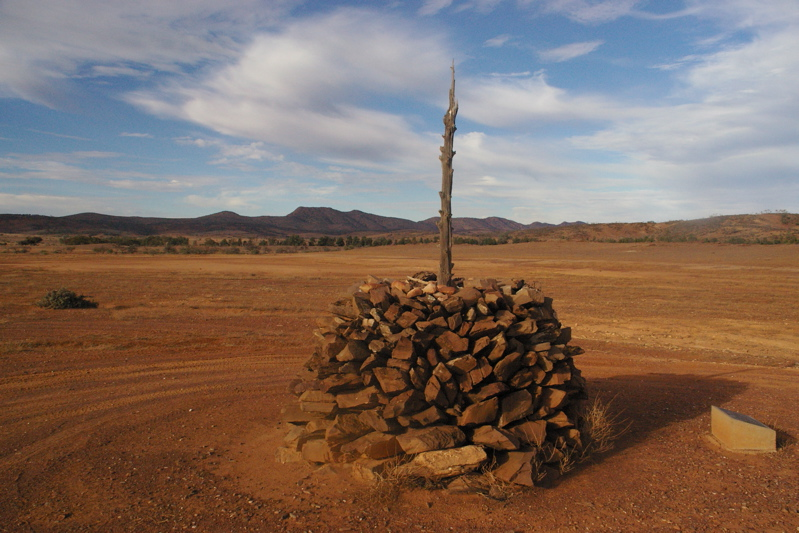
J.M. Painter's surveying cairn on western margin of ranges

== See also ==
- Protected areas of South Australia
- Mount Chambers
- Lake Frome Regional Reserve
