= Arkaroola Protection Area =

Protected area in South Australia

- IUCN category II (national park)
- Location within South Australia
- Location: South Australia
- Nearest city: Arkaroola
- Coordinates: 30°18′42″S 139°20′10″E
- Area: 590 km^{2} (230 sq mi)
- Established: 26 April 2012
- Governing body: Department for Environment and Water
- Website: https://www.environment.sa.gov.au/our-places/arkaroola

Arkaroola Protection Area is a protected area located about 600 km (370 mi) north of the Adelaide city centre in the Australian state of South Australia, in the Flinders Ranges. The protected area was established in 2012. It includes the Arkaroola Wilderness Sanctuary (formerly a pastoral lease) and the Mawson Plateau part of the Mount Freeling pastoral lease, and is one of a group of seven geographically separate areas included in a nomination to become a World Heritage Site.

== History ==
Following the public outcry that resulted from Marathon Resources' misconduct in the Arkaroola Wilderness Sanctuary—including the illegal dumping of many tonnes of exploration waste in shallow pits—the South Australian Government promised to introduce legislation to ban all mining activities in the sanctuary, with the Premier stating that "we have decided to give the region unprecedented protection".

The protected area was established in 2012 by the Arkaroola Protection Act 2012 "to provide for the proper management and care of the area; and to prohibit mining activities in the area". The protection area is reported as satisfying the definition of a "category II National Park".

The protection enacted by the South Australian Government prohibits any and all mining within an area roughly coincident with the Arkaroola pastoral lease on which the Arkaroola Wilderness Sanctuary is located. This area includes Mount Gee and the Mount Painter inlier.

== Description ==
Arkaroola Protection Area is located about 600 km (370 mi) north of the Adelaide city centre, in South Australia. Arkaroola was described by geologist and Antarctic explorer Sir Douglas Mawson as "one great open-air museum".

The protection area, which consists of the majority of the Arkaroola pastoral lease (as of 2013 leased by Marg and Doug Sprigg (Note: Doug is the son of Reg Sprigg, and named after his mentor Douglas Mawson.)) and the Mawson Plateau part of the Mount Freeling pastoral lease (as of 2013 leased by GJB Nominees Pty Ltd), covers an area of about 590 square kilometres (230 square miles). The former of the two leases, which has not been stocked since the mid-1980s, is operated for the purpose of conservation and tourism under the name Arkaroola Wilderness Sanctuary. Mount Freeling station is to the north of Arkaroola.

Distinctive geographic features within the Arkaroola Protection Area include:

- Arkaroola Waterhole
- Mawson Plateau (600 m (2,000 ft) average elevation), named after Sir Douglas Mawson
- Mawson Valley, named after Sir Douglas Mawson
- The Pinnacles (448 m (1,470 ft)), located 4 km (2.5 mi) north of Arkaroola Village along the Mawson Valley, and described as "two prominent alkaline to peralkaline granitic pegmatite outcrops occurring in the Neoproterozoic sedimentary rocks"
- "Sitting Bull" (370 m (1,210 ft)), a granite outcrop in Mawson Valley, named by Mawson in 1945
- Freeling Heights (944 m (3,097 ft))
- The Armchair (700 m (2,300 ft))
- Sillers Lookout (680 m (2,230 ft))
- Mount Painter (750 m (2,460 ft))
- Mount Gee (640 m (2,100 ft))

== Geological and paleontological significance ==
The Arkaroola Protection Area is part of the Flinders Ranges geological successions where abundant and diverse arrays of fossils show how animal life began on Earth over a period of 350 million years. The Akaroola Fossil Reef is around 650 million years old, and is one of five of the oldest Neoproterozoic reefs known on Earth. It is the best preserved of all of these reefs for recently-discovered fossil reef-building organisms. These fossils may be the oldest animals known on Earth. The oldest rocks of the Adelaide Rift Complex, as well as the oldest example of complex life, a type of marine sponge that lived in deep water, are in the Arkaroola Reef.

The Sturt Tillite is an outcrop of rock formed by tillite (rocks of assorted sizes and fine sediment deposited by a melting glacier) during the Sturtian glaciation, that later compacted. Tillite Gorge in the Arkaroola Protection Area contains the greatest thickness of Sturt glacial debris known on Earth, as reported by Douglas Mawson in 1949. As the Earth warmed in the period after the Sturt glaciation, barrier reefs were formed offshore by microorganisms at Kingsmill Creek Gorge. The ancient reefs at Arkaroola and in the Vulkathunha-Gammon Ranges National Park are some of the earliest barrier reefs on the planet, and pre-date the Ediacaran biota by around 90 million years. The Arkaroola Reef and Oodnaminta Reef may have been part of a single large platform, later split by the Paralana Fault.

=== Paralana Hot Springs ===
The melting of Mesoproterozoic rocks created a huge granite body, as well as a unique Phanerozoic fossil "plumbing system" at Mount Gee which once had hot geysers similar to Yellowstone National Park in the US. The Paralana Hot Springs, on the eastern boundary with Wooltana Station, are a remnant of this geothermal system, and is the most recent manifestation of hydrothermal activity in the region. The spring contains radon, and so is not a safe area for swimming or camping.

It is home to many bacteria, notable for their survival in very high temperatures (57-59 °C) as well as ionising radiation from the radon gas. A 2002 study found about 180 different kinds of bacteria, many described for the first time. The springs are also of interest for their parallels to what has been found on Mars.

=== Research ===
The glacial deposits at Arkaroola were first studied by Douglas Mawson in 1905, when he was a lecturer at the University of Adelaide, and research continued through the 1920s and 1930s. In 1926 Mawson described the sequence below Mount Jacob (south of Stubbs Waterhole), and his former student, Reg Sprigg, later described "essentially unmodified and very thick exposures of Sturtian glacial tillites" at Stubbs Waterhole. Many research institutions continue their research at Arkaroola, including the South Australian Museum, and training in economic geology by the University of Adelaide and the Geological Survey of South Australia.

=== World Heritage bid ===
Arkaroola Protection Area is one of a group of seven geographically separate areas that were submitted to the UNESCO World Heritage Centre for consideration as a World Heritage Site under criterion (viii) on 15 April 2021, and as of August 2025 remain on the tentative list. The nomination will be voted on in 2026.

== See also ==
- Vulkathunha-Gammon Ranges National Park
