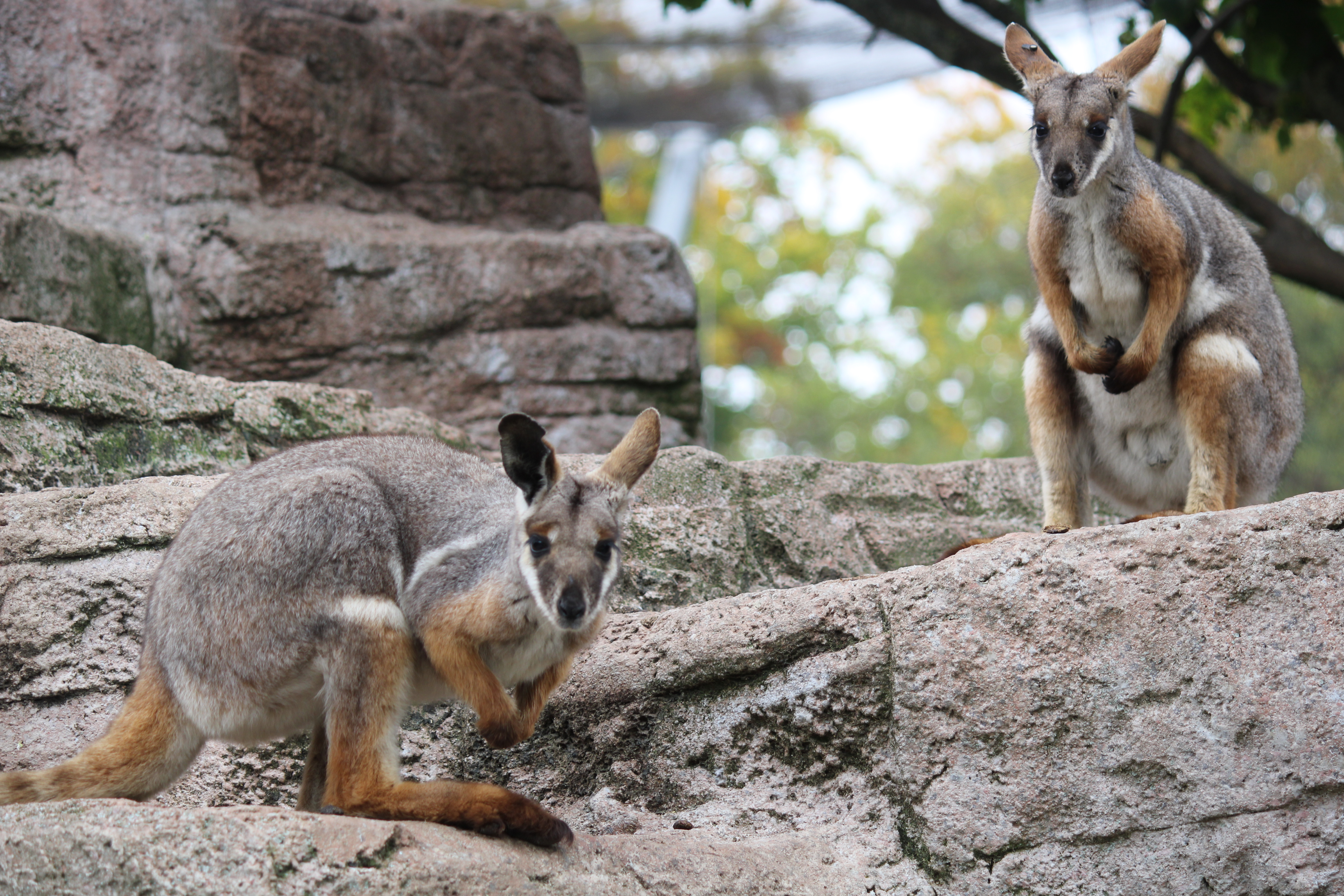

Conservation status
- Near Threatened (IUCN 3.1)

Scientific classification
- Kingdom: Animalia
- Phylum: Chordata
- Class: Mammalia
- Infraclass: Marsupialia
- Order: Diprotodontia
- Family: Macropodidae
- Genus: Petrogale
- Species: P. xanthopus

Binomial name
- Petrogale xanthopus J. E. Gray, 1855
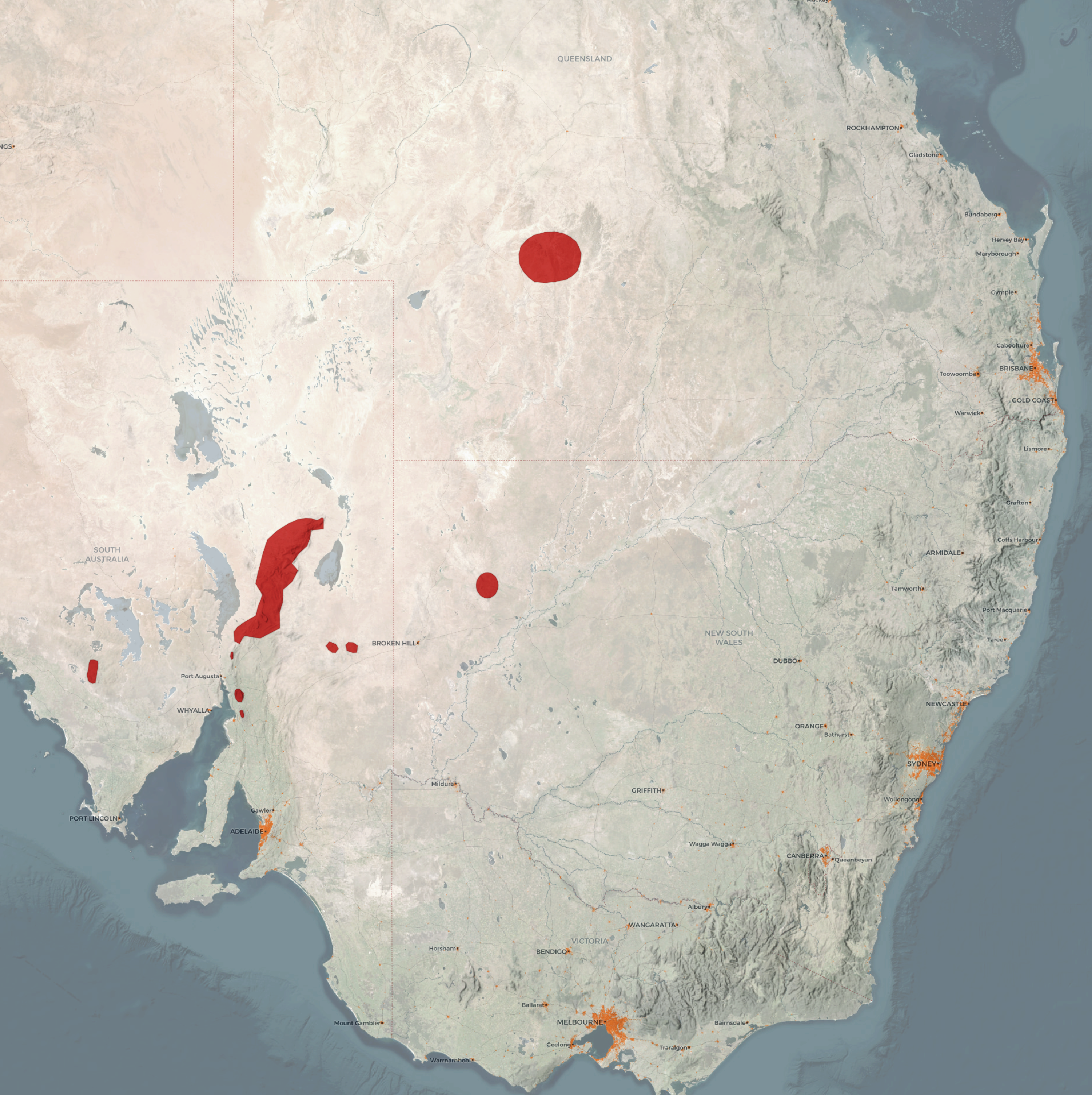
- native range (IUCN data)

= Yellow-footed rock-wallaby =

Species of marsupial

The yellow-footed rock-wallaby (Petrogale xanthopus), formerly known as the ring-tailed rock-wallaby, is a member of the macropod family (the marsupial family that includes the kangaroos, wallabies, tree-kangaroos, and wallaroos).

== Taxonomy ==
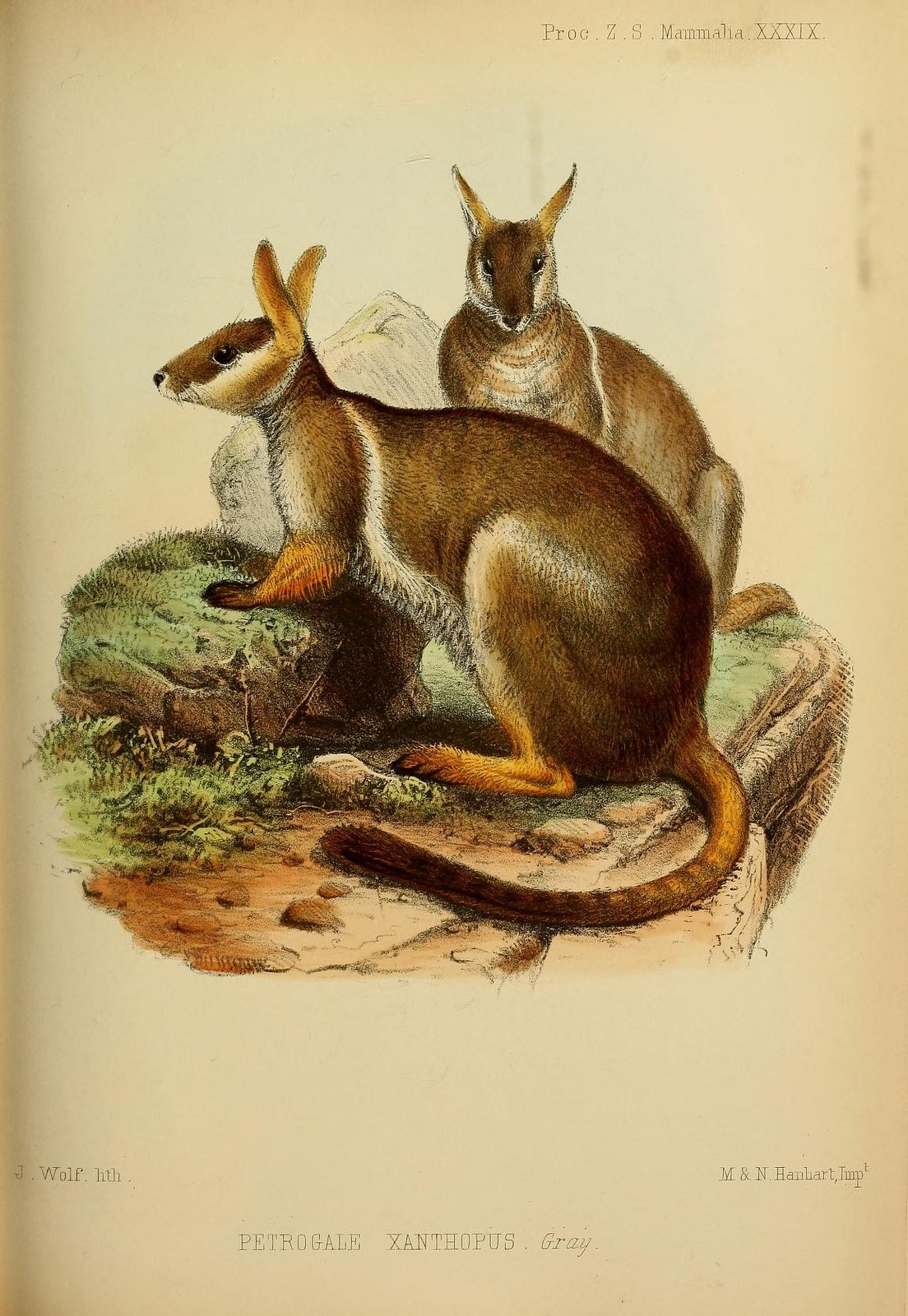
Yellow-footed rock wallabies illustrated by Joseph Wolf, 1855

This species was first described by John Edward Grey in 1855 in the Proceedings of the Zoological Society of London. The description was based on two specimens (a male and a female), which were possibly collected from the Richmond River. The illustration that accompanied the published description was produced by Joseph Wolf.

== Description ==
The yellow-footed rock-wallaby is grey to fawn-grey above and light-coloured below with a black mid-dorsal stripe from the crown of the head to the centre of the back. There is a distinct white cheek stripe, with ears ranging in colour from orange to grey-brown. The forearms and hind legs are bright yellow to rich orange to a light orange-brown. The tail is orange-brown irregularly ringed with dark brown and golden-brown, with the colour of the tip variable from dark brown to white. The head and body length is 480–650 mm (usually 600 mm), with tail length 570–700 mm (usually 690 mm), and weight 6–11 kg.

== Distribution and habitat ==
This species of rock-wallaby is found in western New South Wales, eastern South Australia and isolated portions of Queensland. It is not typically found near human habitation, instead preferring rough terrain and rock outcroppings.

== Subspecies ==
There are two recognised subspecies. There are no observable differences between the two subspecies, but genetic analysis of DNA samples from the different populations found them to be genetically distinct. The genetic divergence between the subspecies is greater than that between some other rock-wallaby species, reinforcing the subspecies status.

The two subspecies are:

=== P. x. xanthopus ===
P. x. xanthopus is listed as vulnerable under the Environment Protection and Biodiversity Conservation Act 1999 by the Australian government. Colonies persist in South Australia, within the Gawler Ranges, the Flinders Ranges and the Olary Ranges. The population is SA is estimated at 2,000 to 6,500 animals, with great uncertainty and likely large fluctuations. Due to conservation efforts by sanctuaries in the Flinders Ranges and pastoralists in the Olary Ranges, populations there have increased in recent years.

In NSW, colonies have been found at three sites in the Gap Range and seven sites in the Coturaundee Range, with a population of between 170 and 215 animals. Threats include competition from introduced herbivores (in particular feral goats and rabbits), predation by foxes and feral cats, isolation of populations, and habitat destruction through mineral exploration.

=== P. x. celeris ===
P. x. celeris is listed as vulnerable under the Environment Protection and Biodiversity Conservation Act 1999 by the Australian government. It has a restricted distribution in the rocky ranges of central-western Queensland. Threats include fox predation, competition with domestic and wild introduced species (particularly goats and cattle), climate change, reduced access to water sources, habitat loss and fragmentation, and increase in bushfires. The population of P. x. celeris was estimated to be 5,000-10,000 individuals in 1993, but is now considered unknown.

== Conservation ==
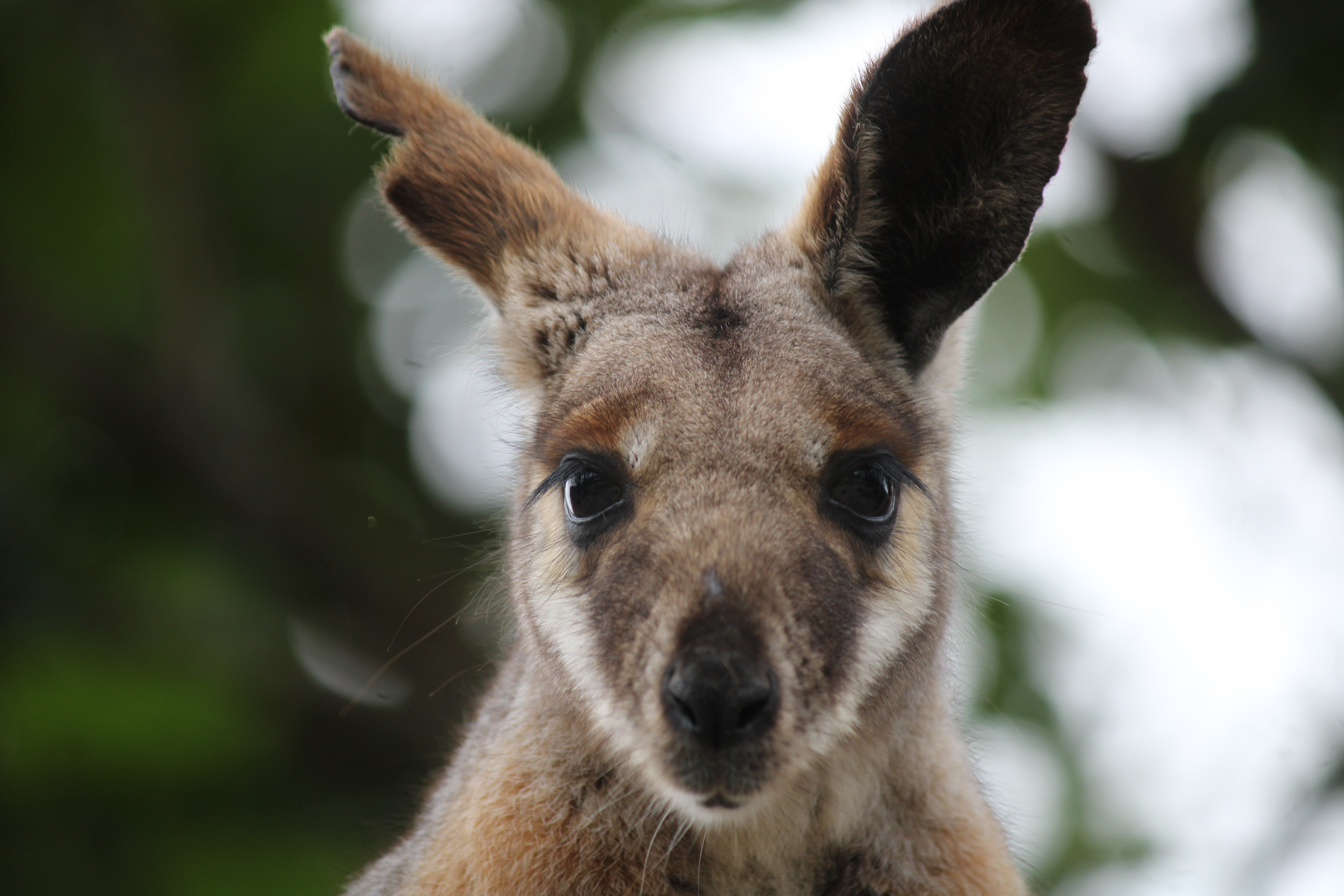
Head, close-up

Previously the species has been killed in large numbers for its pelt, primarily through the period between the 1880s and 1920s.

The yellow-footed rock-wallaby was originally known and described from specimens from South Australia. The species was subsequently discovered in New South Wales (and Queensland) where it was first recorded in 1964 in the Coturaundee Ranges, now part of Mutawintji National Park. The two small mountain ranges in the far west of the state are still the only known places where the species survives in New South Wales.

In 1968, the Arkaroola Wilderness Sanctuary was established on the 610-square-kilometre (240 sq mi) Arkaroola pastoral lease, with a specific goal of protecting the yellow footed rock wallaby. Conservation activities include extensive fox baiting, and the control of feral cats and goats, as well as occasional hand-rearing of abandoned joeys.

In 1979, the Foundation for National Parks & Wildlife purchased 100 square kilometres of this land, which then became Coturaundee Nature Reserve, for the conservation and protection of the yellow-footed rock-wallaby. Further funds were allocated to fox and goat eradication. Annual surveys of the area, which is now part of Mutawintji National Park, indicate that the population is now recovering, seemingly having grown progressively since 1995, with at least one large fluctuation due to rainfall changes noted. The recovery strategy that saved the yellow-footed rock-wallaby initially served as a model to preserve other rock-wallabies, including the brush-tailed rock-wallaby, from extinction.

From 1998, when the first Indigenous Protected Area was set up adjacent to the southern boundary of the Gammon Ranges National Park, near Nepabunna, the Adnyamathanha people have been helping to protect the rock wallaby at Nantawarrina IPA. The Adnyamathanha people call the animal andu.

== Gallery ==
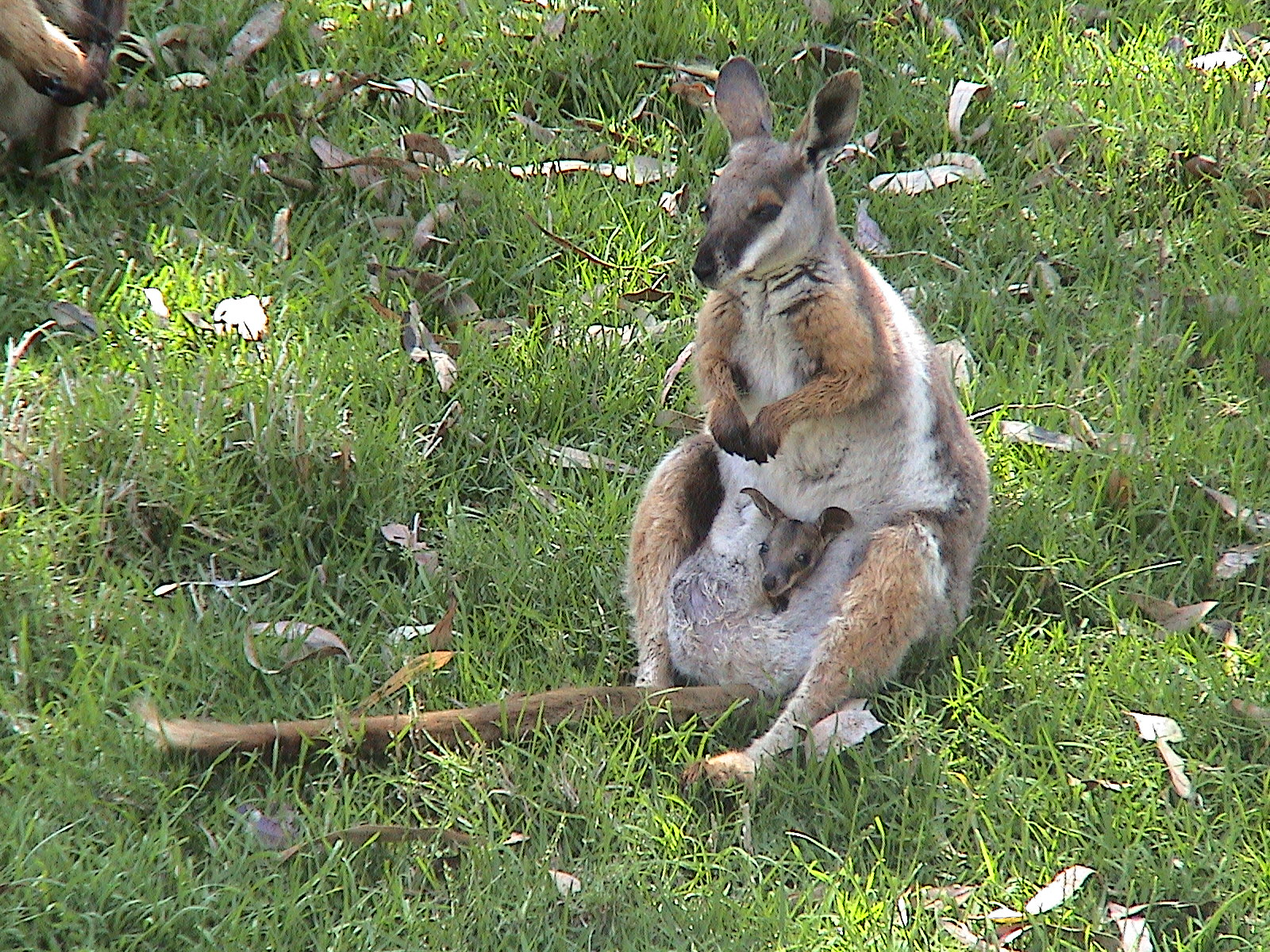
A female yellow-footed rock-wallaby with joey, the Adelaide Zoo

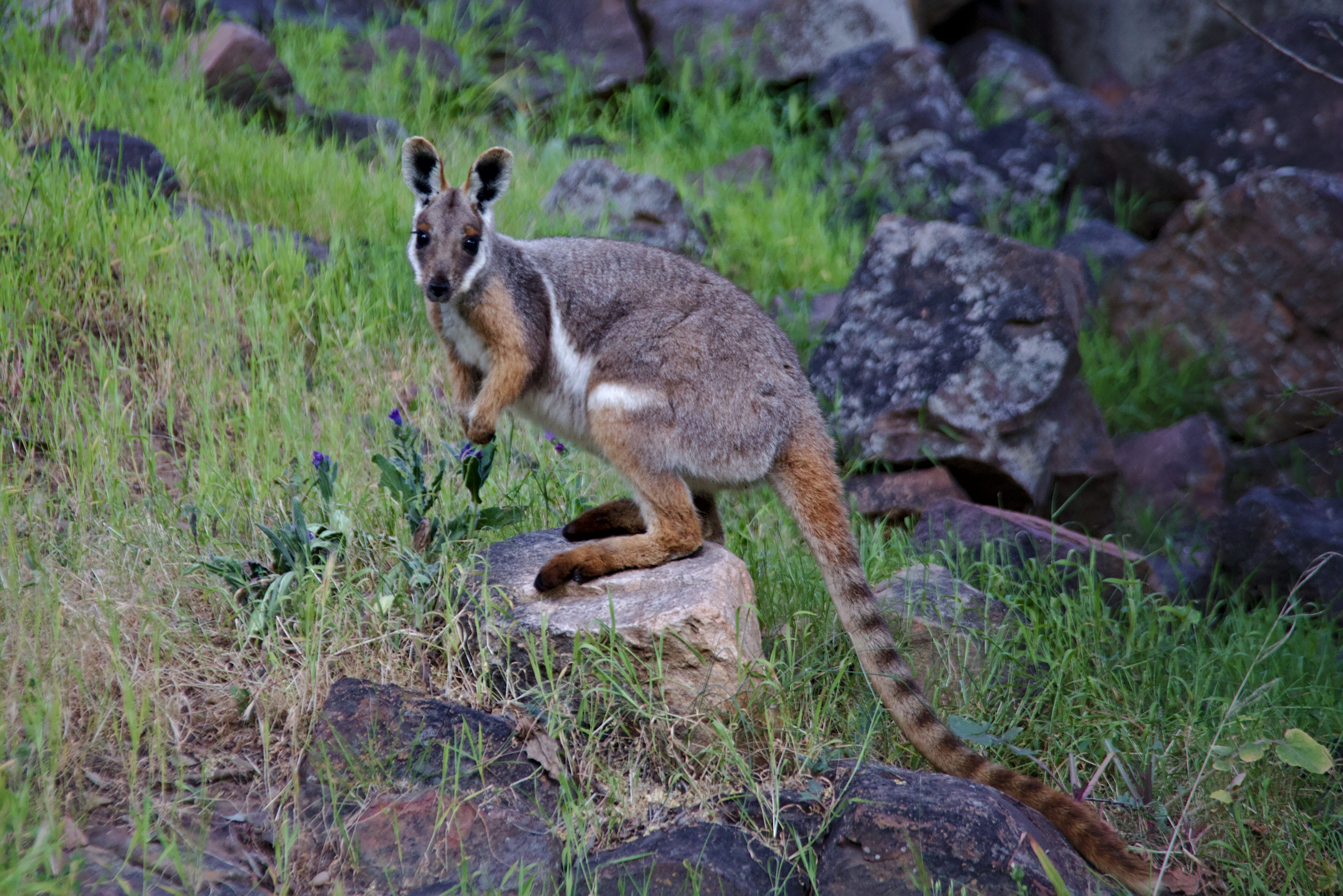
A yellow-footed rock-wallaby in the wild at Warren gorge in the Flinders Ranges

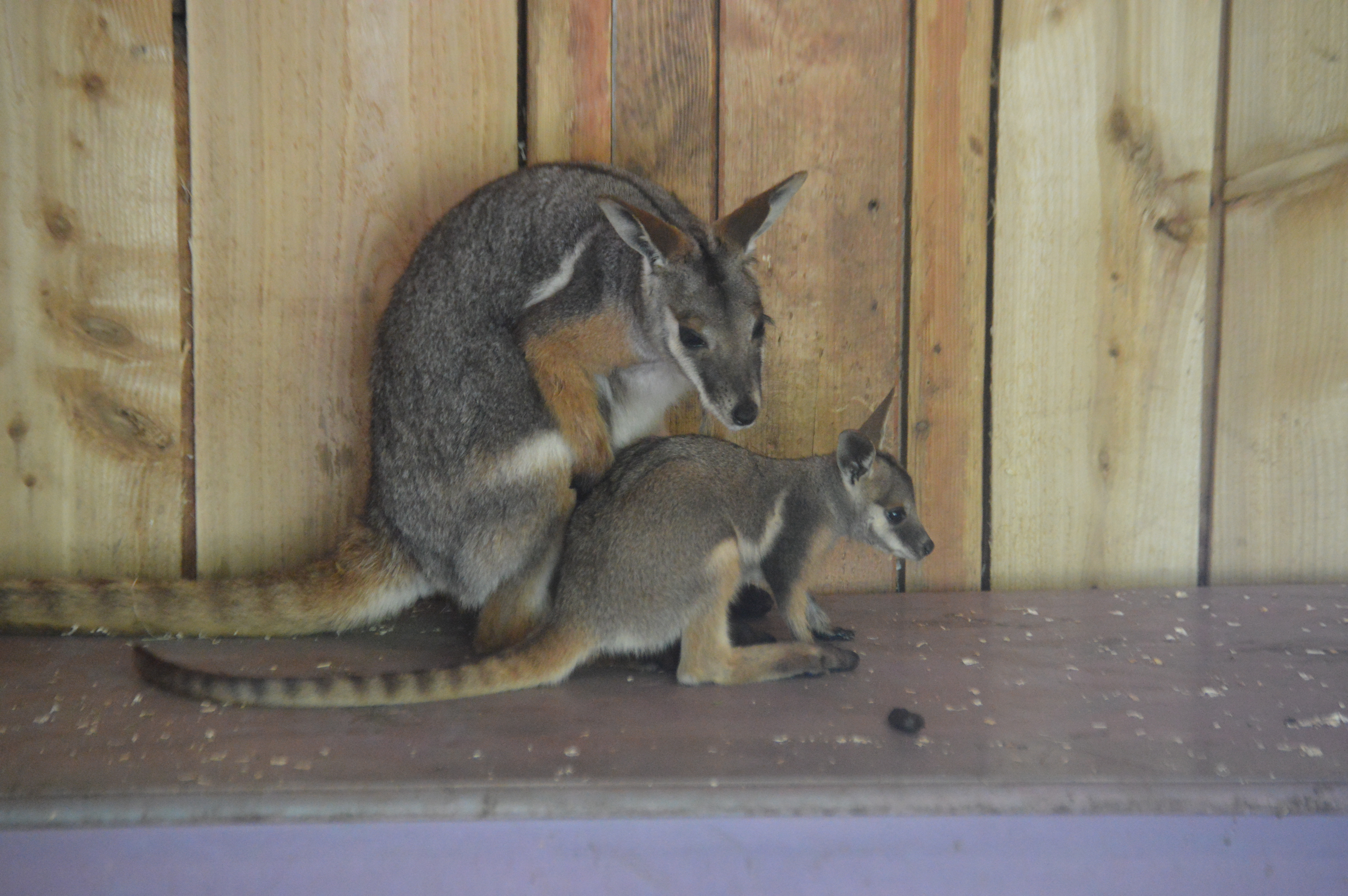
A female yellow-footed rock-wallaby with joey just out of the pouch, the Bristol Zoo

== See also ==
- Arkaroola Wilderness Sanctuary
- Aroona Sanctuary
- Bunkers Conservation Reserve
- Telowie Gorge Conservation Park
- Wapma Thura–Southern Flinders Ranges National Park
