= Balcanoona Airport =

Airport in South Australia

- IATA: LCN; ICAO: YBLC

Summary
- Airport type: Private
- Location: Vulkathunha-Gammon Ranges, South Australia
- Elevation AMSL: 449 ft / 137 m
- Coordinates: 30°32′6″S 139°20′13″E

Map
- Location in South Australia

Runways
Direction	Length		Surface
Direction	ft	m	Surface
05/23	4,199	1,280	Asphalt

Balcanoona Airport (IATA: LCN, ICAO: YBLC) is a small private airport in Vulkathunha-Gammon Ranges National Park, South Australia.

== Facilities ==
There is one runway made of asphalt, with a heading of 05/23, and a length of 4,199 ft (1,280 m).

== See also ==
- List of airports in South Australia
