= Revivalistics =

2020 book by Ghil'ad Zuckermann

Revivalistics: From the Genesis of Israeli to Language Reclamation in Australia and Beyond
- Revivalistics: From the Genesis of Israeli to Language Reclamation in Australia and Beyond, Oxford University Press, 2020
- Language: English
- Publisher: Oxford University Press
- Publication date: 2020

Revivalistics: From the Genesis of Israeli to Language Reclamation in Australia and Beyond is a book written by linguist Ghil'ad Zuckermann. It was published in 2020 by Oxford University Press. The book introduces revivalistics, a trans-disciplinary field of enquiry exploring "the dynamics and problematics inherent in spoken language reclamation, revitalization, and reinvigoration".

== Summary ==
The book is divided into two main parts that match the book subtitle: From the Genesis of Israeli (Part One) to Language Reclamation in Australia and Beyond (Part Two). These parts reflect the author's “journey into language revival from the ‘Promised Land’ to the ‘Lucky Country’”. "Applying lessons from the Hebrew revival of the late nineteenth and early twentieth centuries to contemporary endangered languages, Zuckermann takes readers along a fascinating and multifaceted journey into language revival and provides new insights into language genesis."

=== Part one ===
The first part of the book provides a radical analysis of the most famous case of language revival: the revival of Hebrew, which took place between the 1880s and the 1930s. This analysis contradicts the conventional accounts that the language of the Hebrew Bible is now miraculously re-spoken by modern Israelis. As Rokhl Kafrissen, the New York-based cultural critic and playwright, puts it: "Rather than being a continuation of ancient and mishnaic Hebrew", the result of the Hebrew reclamation according to Zuckermann is "a new language, one whose intrinsic character reflects the mother tongues of its creators."

This part consists of Chapters One to Five:

- Chapter One argues that the language emerging from the Hebrew reclamation should be called Israeli (otherwise known as Modern Hebrew). According to this chapter, Israeli is a hybridic revival language resulting from cross-fertilization between Hebrew and Yiddish, as well as with other languages that – like Yiddish – were spoken by the Hebrew revivalists. In Zuckermann's terms, Israeli is “a mosaic rather than Mosaic tout court”. According to Kafrissen, "one of the most interesting aspects is how Zuckermann explores (and conceptualizes) the Yiddish substrata of ‘Israeli.’ Not just Yiddish words that have been brought into the language, but the innumerable direct translations (calques) from Yiddish to ‘Israeli’, as well as carried over linguistic forms."
- Chapter Two demonstrates in detail that grammatical “cross-fertilization” between the language being revived and the revivalists’ first languages is inevitable even in the case of successful “revival languages”. According to Zuckermann, “revival languages” contradict the tree model in historical linguistics. A tree model implies that a language has only one parent, but Zuckermann argues that successful “revival languages” follow the congruence principle, which is statistical and feature-based. According to Timothy Haines, "Zuckermann advocates acceptance of 'hybridism' rather than 'purism', with a recognition that to be reclaimed and remain a living, accreting language, loanwords and grammatical cross‐fertilizations are unavoidable, particularly from the revivalists' mother tongues." "Zuckermann's revivalistics 'discards any imprisoning purism prism … Hybridization results in new diversity, which is beautiful.' (p. 209 [of Revivalistics])."
- Chapter Three focusses on language as a useful tool for nationhood and vice versa. It provides examples of semantic secularization involving ideological “lexical engineering”, as exemplified by deliberate, subversive processes of extreme semantic shifting, pejoration, amelioration, trivialization and allusion.
- Chapter Four proposes that language academies are useful for a revival language – but only until the revival language becomes a “fully-fledged, alive and kicking” tongue.
- Chapter Five, entitled “Shift Happens: Tarbutomics, Israeli Culturomics”, explores culturomics as a useful quantitative tool for revivalistics and linguistics. Culturomics is described in this chapter as a trans-disciplinary form of computational lexicology that studies human behaviour, language, and cultural and historical trends through the quantitative analysis of texts. Zuckermann's term tarbutomics is based on תרבות (tarbút), which means 'culture'.

=== Part two ===
The second part of the book applies lessons from the Hebrew reclamation to language revival movements in Australia and globally. It describes systematically the why of language revival by proposing ethical, aesthetic and utilitarian reasons for language revival. It also describes the how of language revival, offering practical methods for reviving tongues.

According to Professor Joseph Lo Bianco: "Zuckermann expands from the often celebrated case of the revival of the Hebrew in the late nineteenth and early twentieth centuries to discuss what can be learned and applied, and what does not lend itself to such cross-context application, for other endangered languages." "Revivalistics expands the scope of what is aimed for in reversing language shift to contemplating questions beyond revival potential to compensation for acts of historic linguicide and contemporary neglect."

According to the Māori language Professor Hēmi Whaanga: “there are many insightful lessons that can be garnered from this book to assist and guide our Māori language communities. For individuals and groups involved in language planning, language revitalisation, Māori-medium education contexts, I would definitely recommend the second part of this book. In particular the concept of native tongue title and the notion of seeking compensation for linguicide, and the correlation between language revival and wellbeing, are two areas worthy of further exploration in an Aotearoa New Zealand context. As noted in many places throughout this fascinating book, language is the vehicle that carries our deepest thoughts, our ideas, customs, genealogy, history, mythology, songs, prayers, dreams, hopes, desires, frustrations, anger, knowledge, and identity. It is at the core of our existence.”

This part consists of Chapters Six to Nine:

- Chapter Six proposes “revivalistics” as a beneficial global, comparative, trans-disciplinary field of enquiry. The chapter outlines the history of linguicide (language killing) during colonization in Australia. The chapter also introduces a practical tool: the "Language Revival Diamond", featuring four core revivalistic quadrants: (1) language owners, (2) linguistics, (3) education and (4) the public sphere.
- Chapter Seven puts forward that technology and "talknology" are double-edged swords: they are not only language killers but can also be used to reverse language shift. The chapter describes the development of the Barngarla Dictionary App, and demonstrates two examples of language revival:
1. A book written in 1844 to assist a Lutheran German missionary to introduce the “Christian light” to Aboriginal people is used 170 years later by a secular Jew to assist the Barngarla people to reconnect with their own Aboriginal heritage, which was subject to linguicide conducted by Anglo-Celtic Australians.
2. Technology that was used for colonization, such as ships and weapons, and Stolen Generations, such as governmental black cars kidnapping mixed-race (“half-caste”) Aboriginal children from their mothers to forcibly assimilate them, is used in the form of a mobile app to assist the Barngarla to reconnect with their cultural autonomy, intellectual sovereignty and spirituality.
- Chapter Eight recommends that people whose language was subject to linguicide should be compensated for language loss. Zuckermann terms this compensation “Native Tongue Title”, modelled upon native title to land.
- Chapter Nine considers the relationship between language revival and mental health. Zuckermann first describes research which shows a correlation between Aboriginal Canadian language loss and youth suicide. Zuckermann posits a correlation in the other direction; just as language loss increases suicidal ideation and reduces well-being, language revival reduces suicidal ideation and improves well-being.

== Reception ==
The volume has received a mixed reception from linguists, other academics and the public. The book has been summarized by linguist Bernard Spolsky as a "brilliant but at times irritating book" which provides "an original understanding of the use and history of [Hebrew and Yiddish]" but, at the same time, can be likened to "a teacher trying to keep a large undergraduate class amused rather than an academic work." Patrick Heinrich concludes his Linguist List review by stating that "book does not [...] suggest itself as a new textbook for teaching the subject at hand [because it] is too fragmented, does not give a state-of-the-art overview, is anecdotal over large parts, and does not introduce or define key concepts and research methodologies."

Commentary from journalists and commentators from outside linguistics has been positive, with the book praised for its humor and described variously as a "masterpiece that is both scholarly and social‐minded," "an ambitious volume," "very important", "groundbreaking", "magnificent", "bold", "exuberant" "milestone book", “which will be referred to for many years to come".

The book was listed as No. 7 in The Australian's ranking of "Australia’s top 10 academic books" for 2021, a list based on the number of citations that year: Revivalistics received 16 citations in 2021 including self-citations.

== Bibliography ==
- Zuckermann, Ghil'ad (2003). Language Contact and Lexical Enrichment in Israeli Hebrew. Palgrave Macmillan. ISBN 9781403917232.
- Zuckermann, Ghil'ad (2020). Revivalistics: From the Genesis of Israeli to Language Reclamation in Australia and Beyond. Oxford University Press. ISBN 9780199812790. ISBN 9780199812776 (hardback)
