= Native tongue title =

Linguistic revivalistic term

Native tongue title is a revivalistic term that refers to compensation for linguicide (language killing). Native tongue title is the enactment of a statute-based, ex gratia financial compensation scheme, to cover efforts to resuscitate a heritage tongue that was killed (for example, due to colonisation), or to empower an endangered one.

== Origin ==
The term was coined by linguist and language revivalist Ghil'ad Zuckermann. He modelled it on the Australian term, native title, which refers to the common law doctrine according to which the land rights of Indigenous peoples persist after the assumption of sovereignty under settler colonialism.

== Native tongue title vs native title ==
Zuckermann argues that despite native title, and although some Australian states have enacted ex gratia compensation schemes for the victims of the Stolen Generations policies, the victims of linguicide are overlooked. He proposes that existing competitive grant schemes by the Australian government to support Australian Aboriginal languages should be complemented with compensation schemes, which are based on a claim of right rather than on competition.

Anthropologist Timothy Haines wrote that Zuckermann's "remarkable achievement" of reclaiming the Barngarla language in South Australia may have "assisted in the process of the recognition of the Barngarla people's native title". The presiding Federal Court judge, Justice John Mansfield, had commented that their active pursuit of language revival, assisted by Zuckermann, showed evidence of the people's continued connection with their land and culture "despite the separation that many had endured as 'Stolen Generation' children of the 1960s and '70s, when they were forcibly removed by the State to homes in Adelaide, far distant from their native Eyre Peninsula in South Australia's west".
