= Phraseology =

Linguistic study of phrases

In linguistics, phraseology is the study of set or fixed expressions, such as idioms, phrasal verbs, and other types of multi-word lexical units (often collectively referred to as phrasemes), in which the component parts of the expression take on a meaning more specific than, or otherwise not predictable from, the sum of their meanings when used independently. For example, ‘Dutch auction’ is composed of the words Dutch ‘of or pertaining to the Netherlands’ and auction ‘a public sale in which goods are sold to the highest bidder’, but its meaning is not ‘a sale in the Netherlands where goods are sold to the highest bidder’; instead, the phrase has a conventionalized meaning referring to any auction where, instead of rising, the prices fall.

== History ==
Phraseology (from Greek φράσις phrasis, "way of speaking" and -λογία -logia, "study of") is a scholarly approach to language which developed in the twentieth century. It took its start when Charles Bally's notion of locutions phraseologiques entered Russian lexicology and lexicography in the 1930s and 1940s and was subsequently developed in the former Soviet Union and other Eastern European countries. From the late 1960s on it established itself in (East) German linguistics but was also sporadically approached in English linguistics. The earliest English adaptations of phraseology are by Weinreich (1969) within the approach of transformational grammar, Arnold (1973), and Lipka (1992 [1974]). In Great Britain as well as other Western European countries, phraseology has steadily been developed over the last twenty years. The activities of the European Society of Phraseology (EUROPHRAS) and the European Association for Lexicography (EURALEX) with their regular conventions and publications attest to the prolific European interest in phraseology. European scholarship in phraseology is more active than in North America. Bibliographies of recent studies on English and general phraseology are included in Welte (1990) and specially collected in Cowie & Howarth (1996) whose bibliography is reproduced and continued on the internet and provides a rich source of the most recent publications in the field.

== Phraseological units ==
The basic units of analysis in phraseology are often referred to as phrasemes or phraseological units. Phraseological units are (according to Prof. Kunin A.V.) stable word-groups with partially or fully transferred meanings ("to kick the bucket", “Greek gift”, “drink till all's blue”, “drunk as a fiddler (drunk as a lord, as a boiled owl)”, “as mad as a hatter (as a march hare)”). According to Rosemarie Gläser, a phraseological unit is a lexicalized, reproducible bilexemic or polylexemic word group in common use, which has relative syntactic and semantic stability, may be idiomatized, may carry connotations, and may have an emphatic or intensifying function in a text.

== Bibliography ==
- Altenberg, Bengt. 1998. ‘On the Phraseology of Spoken English: The Evidence of Recurrent Word-Combinations’, in Phraseology. Ed. A.P. Cowie. Oxford: Clarendon.
- Álvarez de la Granja, María, ed. 2008. Fixed Expressions in Cross-Linguistic Perspective. A Multilingual and Multidisciplinary Approach. Hamburg: Verlag Dr. Kovac.
- Amosova, N.N. 1963. Osnovi angliyskoy frazeologii. Leningrad.
- Anscombre, Jean-Claude & Salah Mejri, eds. 2011. Le figement linguistique : la parole entravée. Paris: Honoré Champion.
- Arsentieva, E.F. 2006. Frazeologiya i frazeografija v sopostavitel’nom aspekte (na materiale angliyskogo i russkogo yazikov). Kazan’.
- Burger, Harald, Dobrovol´skij, Dmitrij, Kuhn, Peter, & Norrrick, Neal, eds. 2007. Phraseology: An International Handbook of Contemporary Research. 2 vols. Berlin: de Gruyter.
- Cowie, A.P. 1998. Phraseology: Theory, Analysis, and Applications. Oxford: Oxford University Press.
- Cherdantseva, T.Z. 2007. Jazik I ego obrazi: Ocherki po italyanskoy frazeologii. Moscow: URSS.
- Everaert, Martin, Erik-Jan van der Linden, André Schenk, & Rob Schreuder, eds. 1995. Idioms: Structural and Psychological perspective. Hillsdale, NJ: Lawrence Erlbaum.
- Gläser, Rosemarie. 1998. ‘The Stylistic Potential of Phraselological Units in the Light of Genre Analysis’, in Phraseology. Ed. A.P. Cowie. Oxford: Clarendon.
- Häusermann, Jürg. 1977. Phraseologie: Hauptprobleme der deutschen Phraseologie auf der Basis sowjetischer Forschungsergebnisse. Berlin/Boston: de Gruyter.
- Knappe, Gabriele. 2004. Idioms and Fixed Expressions in English Language Study before 1800. Frankfort: Peter Lang.
- Kunin, A.V. 1967. ‘Osnovnie ponjatija angliyskoy frazeologii kak lingvisticheskoy disciplini’, in Anglo-russkiy frazeologicheskiy slovar. Moscow. pp. 1233–1264.
- Kunin, A.V. 1970. Angliyskaya frazeologiya. Moscow.
- Kunin, A.V. 1972. Frazeologija sovremennogo angliyskogo yazika. Moscow.
- Kunin, A.V. 1996. Kurs fraseologii sovremennogo angliyskogo yazika. 2-e izd. pererab. Moscow: Visshaya Shkola.
- Mel’čuk I.A. 1995. ‘Phrasemes in Language and Phraseology in Linguistics’, in Idioms: Structural and Psychological perspectives. Eds. Martin Everaert, Erik-Jan van der Linden, André Schenk, & Rob Schreuder. Hillsdale, NJ: Lawrence Erlbaum, pp. 167–232.
- Mokienko, V.M. 1989. Slavjanskaya frazeologiya. Moscow: Visshaya Shkola.
- Molotkov, A.I. 1977. Osnovi frazeologii russkogo jazika. Leningrad: Nauka.
- Nazaryan, A.G. 1987. Frazeologiya sovremennogo frantsuzkogo jazika. Moscow.
- Raichshtein, A.D. 1980. Sopostavitelniy analiz nemetskoy I russkoy frazeologii. Moscow: Visshaya Shkola.
- Shanskiy, N.M. 1985. Frazeologiya sovremennogo russkogo yazika. Moscow: Visshaya Shkola.
- Soloduho, E.M. 1982. Problemi internazional'noy frazeoologii. Kazan’.
- Zhukov, V.P. 1978. Semantika frazeologicheskih oborotov. Moscow: Prosveshenie.
- Zuckermann, Ghil'ad. 2003. Language Contact and Lexical Enrichment in Israeli Hebrew. Palgrave Macmillan.
