= Max Wehrli =

Swiss literary scholar and Germanist

- Born: 17 September 1909; Zurich
- Died: 18 December 1998 (aged 89); Zurich
- Education: University of Zurich
- Scientific career
- Fields: German studies
- Workplaces: University of Zurich
- Doctoral advisor: Emil Ermatinger
- Doctoral students: Harald Burger

Max Wehrli (17 September 1909 – 18 December 1998) was a Swiss literary scholar and Germanist. Wehrli studied from 1928 till 1935 about Germanic and Greek at the Universities of Zurich and Berlin. Among his teachers were Emil Ermatinger, Ernst Howald and Nicolai Hartmann. In 1936, he wrote his Ph.D. thesis at the University of Zurich.

Since 1953, Max Wehrli was tenured professor for the history of German literature at Zurich. In 1955, he was visiting professor at the Columbia University in New York City.

== Awards ==
- 1979 Prix Gottfried Keller

== Works ==
- Johann Jakob Bodmer und die Geschichte der Literatur. Zürich, Phil. I Sekt., Diss. Frauenfeld, Leipzig 1936.
- Das barocke Geschichtsbild in Lohensteins Arminius. Frauenfeld, Leipzig 1938.
- Allgemeine Literaturwissenschaft. Bern 1951.
- Gottfried Kellers Verhältnis zum eigenen Schaffen. Basel 1963.
- Formen mittelalterlicher Erzählung: Aufsätze. Zürich 1969.
- Geschichte der deutschen Literatur von den Anfängen bis zum Ende des 16. Jahrhunderts. Stuttgart 1980.
- Literatur im deutschen Mittelalter: eine poetologische Einführung. Stuttgart 1984.
