= Häusermann =

Häusermann is a surname. Notable people with the surname include:

- Jürg Häusermann (born 1951), Swiss-German media scholar
- Ruedi Häusermann (born 1948), Swiss composer and director
- Silja Häusermann (born 1977), Swiss political scientist
