= Cultureme =

Aspect of cultural behavior

A cultureme is any portion of cultural behavior apprehended in signs of symbolic value that can be broken down into smaller units or amalgamated into larger ones. A cultureme is a "cultural information-bearing unit", the contents of which are recognizable by a group of people. Culturemes are the bridge between linguistic units and culture.

Their usage can be seen in cultural expressions, phraseologisms, jokes, slogans, literature, religion, folklore, sociology, anthropology, etc. All of which are subcultures in a culture system. Culturemes of this nature have historical relevance that when translated or explained results in miscommunication and misunderstanding.

The notion of cultureme is being increasingly used in translation studies and other disciplines. It is a recently used concept that is yet to be defined and distinguished from others, such as phraseme, idiom, symbol, cultural word, etc.

== Phases of a cultureme ==
Fernando Poyatos breaks down the features of a cultureme into four phases. These phases analysis the broadest of culturemes to the most particular aspects of culturemes.

=== Phase One: Basic Culturemes ===
Basic culturemes are the broadest of culturemes. They characterize the initial semblance of a culture. Basic culturemes are separated into two cultural "realms," urban and rural, and two domains: exterior and interior. Basic culturemes begin with urban and rural realms because of their dichotomy in cultural identity and displays of social interactions. Within either culture, there are exteriors (what is observed from the outside) and interiors (what is observed from the inside of buildings or establishments that are not seen from an outdoor perspective). The main divisions of culturemes are: urban-exterior, urban-interior, rural-exterior, and rural-interior.

The significance of basic culturemes is to give a general sense of surroundings. For instance,

"in North America (United States and Canada): the larger size of many automobiles, the summery sound and smell of lawn mowing, the smell of city bus exhausts, the basic separation of the 'downtown' business and residential areas in the small town or village, the sirens of their police cars, the smell of hamburger and French fries of many eating establishments, the unique drugstore smell, the 'Licensed' signs in many second-rate restaurants (indicating a cultural attitude towards drinking"

=== Phase Two: Primary Culturemes ===
Primary culturemes exist in the phase when acculturation occurs, in which one's culture is becoming more complex. The four basic culturemes are subcategorized into environmental (cultural settings) and behavioral (behaviors of people and their interactions). These culturemes are a result of recognizing cultural patterns and "experiencing it through mere observation or systemic learning."

=== Phase Three: Secondary Culturemes ===
Culturemes are further broken down into settings, in which a specific culture is exemplified. This includes cultures in the school, the park, the bar, etc. These are secondary culturemes. Phase three is the point where the cultures identified in phase two begin to interact. Interrelationships are seen among different cultural systems and values.

=== Phase Four: Tertiary Culturemes ===
Phase four delves deeper into human senses, analyzing to the fullest extent possible. The completion of phase four allows one to identify the cultureme's cultural system and subculture. Knowing the cultural system and subculture are important as it helps to navigate through other identifiable systems within the culture.

== Translation ==
Translating a cultureme can be challenging, as connotations are sometimes very strong. For instance: the Spanish word alcázar means "the castle", "palace" or "fortress", but, as it is of Arabic origin, it recalls eight centuries of history (Al Andalus), which cannot be easily translated into English, so the translator must adopt a crucial decision: either choose the English word "fortress" and lose all the historical and cultural connotations, or use the loan word alcazar.

A language may have various cultures and various languages may share the same culture. Cultures may differ in conceptualization that may in turn affect how thoughts are conveyed in their languages. The asymmetry of language complicates the matter of providing a linguistically and culturally sound equivalent of a cultureme in another language. The complex relationship of language and culture is significant in giving culturemes their intended value. Dictionaries further complicate cross-cultural gaps of meaning because without the collaborative effort of all cultures, it is impossible to define the significance of words that may be culturemes in the dictionary. Though, slowly, interactive and multimedia dictionaries have become extensive in information that lessen the bridge across languages and cultures.

Culturemes are translated in several ways:

- Literal translation: Language of the cultureme is rendered in another language in attempts to convey the same core meaning.
- Functional equivalence: Translating meaning without the inclusion of its cultural association.
- Near-synonymy: A translation has a similar meaning to the cultureme without being identical.
- Under-specification: A space-saving technique that give a short and manageable definition.
- Distortion: A translation that does not preserve the same meaning as the cultureme.
- Explanation: A translator uses this technique in their efforts to get the audience to fully understand the meaning. This can involve lengthy and overly detailed descriptions.
- Category change: In the instance that the cultureme is obsolete or no longer relevant, a modern-day equivalent is provided.
- Glossary: A given text provides a definition at the end.
- Over-specification: More information is given than required.
- No translation: Some culturemes are kept in their original language. This applies mainly to Roman script languages, though other languages may have their culturemes romanized.
- Omission: The translator may omit what they judge to be peripheral in what is meant to be said.

=== Culture: Norms, Ideas, and Materials ===
In translating, the inability to convey cultural meaning strips a cultureme of its "cultureme" title and it simply becomes an ambiguous word. Culture is classified into three categories: Norms, Ideas, and Materials.

- Norms refer to the habits and traditions of a societal group. A culture with a foundation of politeness that uses honorific terms of address, such as in the Korean language, has very intricate forms of pronouns that have nonequivalence in other languages, e.g. English. Different cultures and languages have different interpretations of politeness that affects how successful a cultureme is translated. Traditional holidays are norms in a culture. The Vietnamese New Year Tết is a cultureme of the Vietnamese language and culture. Tết signifies the start of the new year on the Lunar calendar. It is a day of being home with family and cheerful celebration. A literal translation of Tết to English would be "New Year." But, anyone who had no knowledge of the cultureme would think the traditions and practices of "New Year's" all the same.
- Ideas refer to "scientific truths, religious beliefs, myths, legends, works of literature, superstitions, aphorisms, proverbs, and folklore." These culturemes are deep rooted in shared, personal history that outsiders of a culture are unfamiliar with knowing. Culturemes pertaining to cultural ideas do not need explained in the present, their meanings and significance are cemented in the people's knowledge.
- Materials refer to physical culture. Food, for instance, is an important example of tangible culture; it can illustrate dietary culture/lifestyle. Certain dishes are staples of the culture and can be a product of the local surroundings. The existence of a food or dish may have historical relevance to a culture. Translation in recipes that involve food cultureme can result in the wrong ingredients being introduced.

== See also ==
- Chronotope
- Lexicography
- Linguistic morphology
- Proxemics
