= Adelaide Language Festival =

The Adelaide Language Festival is a language festival that celebrates linguistic diversity and encourages people to learn about the cognitive and cultural advantages of multilingualism. It consists of keynote presentations, musical performances, Welcome to Country by a local Aboriginal Australian, and intensive sessions in dozens of languages.

The Festival was founded in 2014 by Ghil'ad Zuckermann, Professor of Linguistics and Endangered Languages at the University of Adelaide. It is held at Bonython Hall, University of Adelaide.

Each Adelaide Language Festival attracts approximately 500 people.

== Languages represented ==
The Adelaide Language Festival is known for its representation of revived, engineered, endangered and other Less Commonly Taught Languages. It has included intensive sessions of more than 40 languages:

- Australian Aboriginal languages: Pitjantjatjara, Yolngu matha, Flinders Island Language (Queensland) (the latter taught by Peter Sutton).
- revived languages: Revived Hebrew, Hawaiian, Kaurna (Aboriginal), Gamilaraay (Aboriginal), Revived Sanskrit.
- sign languages: Auslan.
- creoles: Norf'k, Bislama.
- international auxiliary languages (auxlangs): Esperanto.
- artistic languages (artlangs): Klingon, Vulcan.
- African languages: Dinka, Swahili.
- Asian languages: Standard Chinese, Japanese, Korean, Vietnamese, Indonesian, Solor Lamaholot.
- Indo-Iranian languages: Hindi, Kalasha (Pakistan), Persian.
- Romance languages: Italian, Latin, French, Brazilian Portuguese, Spanish.
- Slavonic languages: Russian.
- Germanic languages: German, Barossa German, Yiddish, English as a foreign language.
- Uralic languages: Hungarian, Udmurt (Russia).
- Semitic languages: Arabic.

== Language session structure ==
Each language session, a.k.a. "crash course", provides the audience with the following:

- background about the language (e.g. number of speakers, endangerment, related languages),
- basic knowledge in language (e.g. greetings, counting, alphabet),
- a unique characteristic of the language, and
- information about where it might be possible to continue to learn the language (including online resources).

== Keynote speeches ==
Keynote speakers have included Roland Sussex (Winning the LOTEry. Why Learning Languages Gives You a Healthier Mind in a Healthier Body, and Makes You Popular, Attractive and Successful), Lynn Arnold (The Virus of Language), Ghil'ad Zuckermann (Should We Reclaim Killed Languages?), Christopher Pyne (then Federal Minister for Education) and Jeffrey Shandler (Wanted Dead or Alive: Yiddish after WW2).
