= Mordechai Hillel Kroshnitz =

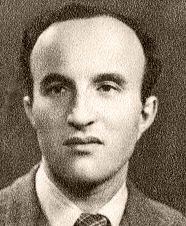

Mordechai Hillel Kroshnitz (Baranowice, Belarus 1915 – Nahariya, Israel 1998) was a Yiddish writer, editor, essayist and journalist. A Zionist, and an Israel Labor Party activist.

== Early life ==
Mordechai Hillel Kroshnitz was born in Baranowice, Russian Empire 1915. He received a traditional Jewish education. From a young age, he was active in the Zionist-Socialistic youth movement Frayheyt (freedom). By the age of 17 he served as the official of the district council, organized the Vilna branch and joined the ‘Shachariya’ kibbutz in Vilna where he met Mina-Tamar, whom he married in 1936. During World War II, he escaped from the Nazis first to Lubcha, and then to the home front of U.S.S.R until he reached Samarkand – Uzbekistan. He fought in the Red Army and was wounded in the battle of Leningrad. At the end of the war returned to Poland and was sent by the Zionist Party to organize the activities in Upper Silesia district. Was the kibbutz manager of Bytom, in which Jewish survivors (Sheerit Hapleyta) were assembled. Was one of the leaders of the survivors in Germany, delegate and lecturer in congresses of the survivors, of Poland Jewry and in the World Jewish Congress in Switzerland (1948). During the War of Independence was active in organizing both illegal immigration to Palestine, and ‘Gachal’ – overseas volunteers for the Israeli Defense Forces. Also was active in raising funds. 1949 made aliyah to Israel with his wife and two children. Worked as secretary of the Clerical Union in Haifa until pension. Afterwards volunteered as an advisor of labor laws in the Israeli workers’ union, until the age of 80.

== Literary and journalist work ==
During all his life was engaged in literary and in journalistic writing in Yiddish. Published regularly in newspapers like Der Morgen. Edited and published books and newspapers in Yiddish, including ‘Bafrayung’ – the labor party's journal of the survivors in Germany, and the assembly ‘Haifa’ (Yearbook for literature and art). Edited and published Yizkor books for Krasnobrod, Lubtch and Delatich. Was from the founders of the member of the Hebrew Writers Association in Israel Wrote four books in Yiddish: Doyres; Erd; Eygns; Natur un Mentsh.

Kroshnitz was awarded the Rubinlicht Prize in 1982.
