= Rubinlicht Prize =

Prize for outstanding contribution to Yiddish literature and scholarship

The Rubinlicht Prize for outstanding contribution to Yiddish literature and scholarship was established to honour Yiddish poet Leib Rubinlicht (1899, Warsaw – 1985, Tel Aviv) by his wife Anna in 1977.

== List of recipients ==
- 2024
  - Boris Sandler
  - Daniel Galay
- 2023
  - Ghil'ad Zuckermann
- 2020
  - Dovid Katz
- 2019
  - Karen Alkalay-Gut
- 2015
  - Velvl Chernin
  - Moshe Sahar
- 2006
  - Dov-Ber Kerler
- 2004
  - Yente Mash
- 1982
  - Mordechai Hillel Kroshnitz
