= Ex gratia =

Legal term

Ex gratia (/ˌɛks ˈɡreɪʃ(i)ə/; also spelled ex-gratia) is Latin for "by favor", and is most often used in a legal context. When something has been done ex gratia, it has been done voluntarily, out of kindness or grace. In law, an ex gratia payment is a payment made without the giver recognising any liability or legal obligation.

== Examples ==
Compensation payments are often made ex gratia if a government or organization is prepared to compensate victims of an event such as an accident or similar but not to admit liability to pay compensation or for causing the event.

- A company conducting layoffs may make an ex gratia payment to the affected employees that is greater than the statutory payment required by the law, perhaps if those employees had a long and well-performing service with the company.
- An insurance company may make an ex gratia payment to customers if a claim does not meet the terms and conditions but the company chooses to make a voluntary payment out of kindness or compassion, without recognizing any obligation to make such a payment.
- When the USS Vincennes fired upon Iran Air Flight 655 in 1988, killing some 290 people, US President Ronald Reagan decided that the United States would offer compensation, on an ex gratia basis, to the families of the victims.
- In a more routine context, Suffolk County Council's document "Ex-Gratia Payments for Loss of or Damage to Personal Property" shows how an education authority compensates victims for damage but without accepting a liability to do so.
- Following the 1994 Black Hawk shootdown incident, on 26 August 1994, the US Department of Defense announced that it would pay $100,000 in compensation to the families of each of the non-US personnel killed in the friendly-fire incident.
- Maharashtra Chief Minister Vilasrao Deshmukh announced ex gratia payments of 100,000 rupees (about US$2,000) to the next of kin of those who died in the 11 July 2006 Mumbai train bombings. Those injured would be given ₹50,000 (about US$1,000) each.
- The prime minister of Malaysia, Datuk Seri Abdullah Haji Ahmad Badawi, announced in June 2008 undisclosed ex gratia payments to the judges who were affected during the 1988 Malaysian constitutional crisis.
- Malaysia Airlines offered an ex gratia condolence payment of US$50,000 to the families of each passenger aboard the missing (assumed crashed) flight MH370, but those affected have considered the conditions unacceptable and have asked the airline to review them.
- In 2016, the New Zealand government awarded David Bain an ex gratia payment of NZ$925,000. While Bain had been acquitted of murdering his family in a retrial held in 2009, the defence had failed to prove his innocence.

== See also ==
Native Tongue Title
