= Otto Jahn =

German philologist, archaeologist, and musicologist (1813–1869)

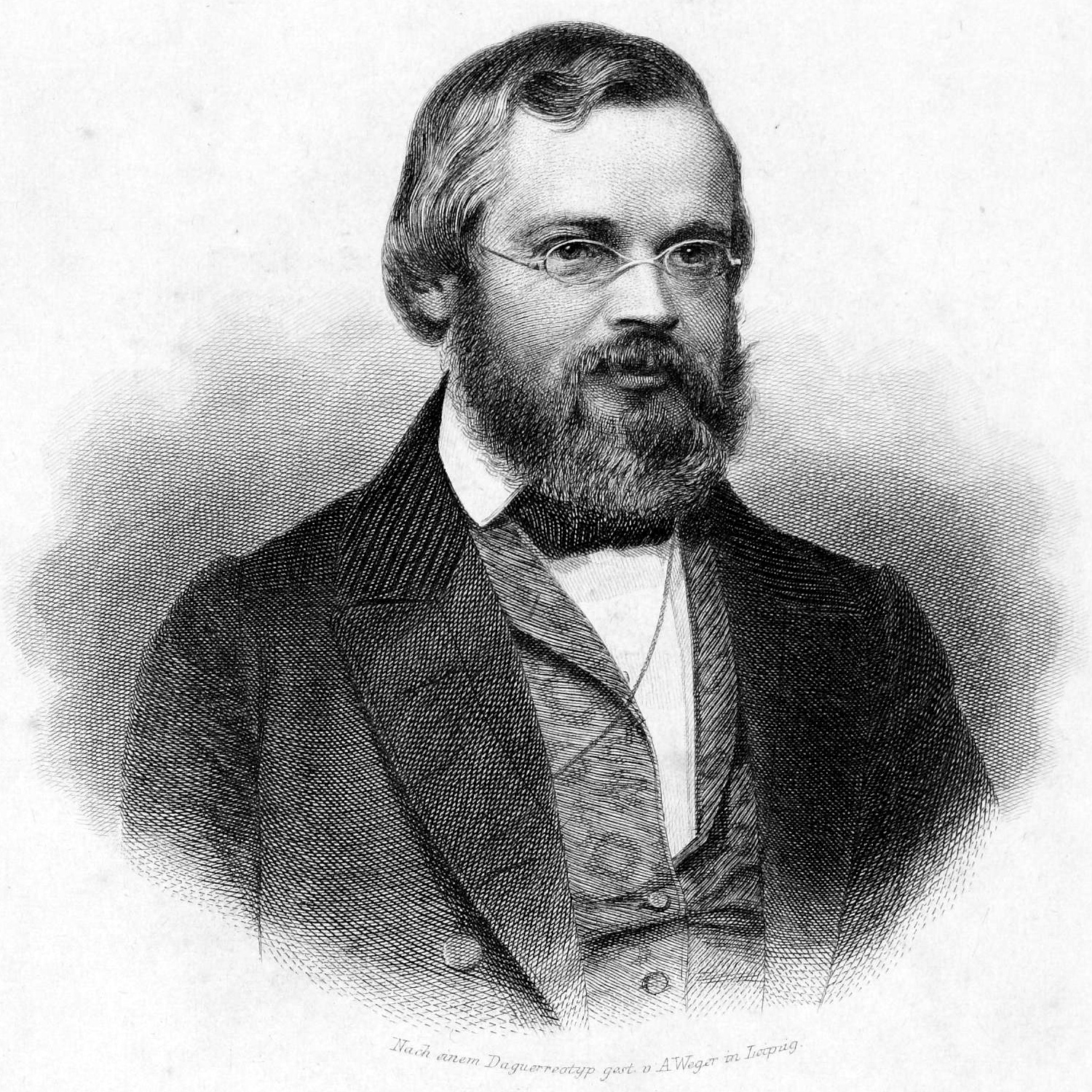
Otto Jahn in 1850s.

Otto Jahn (German: [jaːn]; 16 June 1813, in Kiel – 9 September 1869, in Göttingen) was a German archaeologist, philologist, and writer on art and music.

== Biography ==
After the completion of his university studies at Christian-Albrechts-Universität in Kiel, the University of Leipzig and Humboldt University, Berlin, he traveled for three years in France and Italy. In Rome, he was greatly influenced by the work of August Emil Braun (1809–1856). In 1839 he became privatdozent at Kiel, and in 1842 professor-extraordinary of archaeology and philology at the University of Greifswald (ordinary professor 1845).

In 1847 he accepted the chair of archaeology at Leipzig, however, he along with Theodor Mommsen (1817–1903) and Moritz Haupt (1808–1874) were dismissed from the university in 1851 for having taken part in the political movements of 1848-1849. In 1855 he was appointed professor of the science of antiquity, and director of the academic art museum at Bonn. While here, he turned down an offer as successor to Eduard Gerhard (1795–1867) at Berlin.

His biography of Wolfgang Amadeus Mozart appeared in 1856, the centenary of Mozart's birth. From 1852 Jahn collected as many Mozart manuscripts and letters as he could and copied many others. On learning of the Mozart catalogue being written by Köchel he turned this material over to him. Jahn's work is admired for its scholarly approach (at the time, novel in Mozart biography); and in versions revised by Hermann Abert and Cliff Eisen, continues in use today.

Among Jahn's notable students was the classical archaeologist and philologist Hugo Blümner.

== List of most important works ==
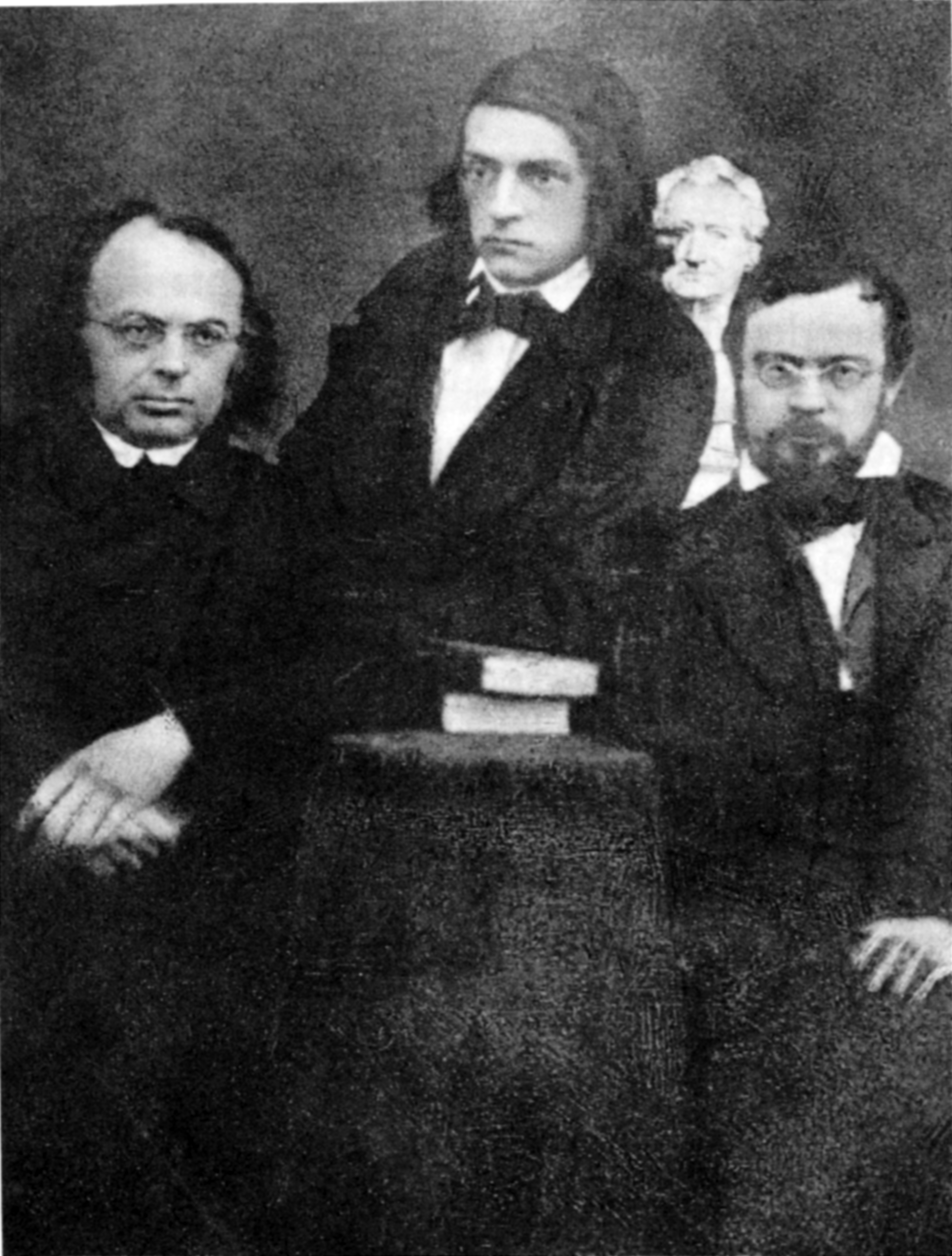
Haupt, Mommsen and Jahn in front of a Goethe bust. Leipzig 1848.

- Archaeological:
  - Palamedes (1836)
  - Telephos und Troilos (1841)
  - Die Gemälde des Polygnot (1841)
  - Pentheus und die Mänaden (1841)
  - Paris und Oinone (1844)
  - Die hellenische Kunst (1846)
  - Peitho, die Göttin der Überredung (1847)
  - Über einige Darstellungen des Paris-Urteils (1849)
  - Die Ficoronische Cista (1852)
  - Pausaniae descriptio arcis Athenarum (3rd ed., 1901)
  - Darstellungen griechischer Dichter auf Vasenbildern (1861)
- Philological:
  - Critical editions of Juvenal, Persius and Sulpicia (3rd ed. by F. Bücheler, 1893)
  - Censorinus (1845)
  - Florus (1852)
  - Cicero's Brutus (4th ed., 1877) and Orator (3rd ed., 1869)
  - the Periochae of Livy (1853)
  - the Psyche et Cupido of Apuleius (3rd ed., 1884; 5th ed., 1905)
  - Longinus (1867; edited. by J. Vahlen, 1905)
- Biographical and aesthetic:
  - Ueber Mendelssohn's Paulus (1842)
  - Biographie Mozarts. The 11th edition of Encyclopædia Britannica called this "a work of extraordinary labour, and of great importance for the history of music" (3rd ed. by Hermann Deiters, 1889–1891; Eng. trans. by P. D. Townsend, 1891)
  - Ludwig Uhland (1863)
  - Gesammelte Aufsätze über Musik (1866)
  - Biographische Aufsätze (1866).

His Griechische Bilderchroniken was published after his death, by his nephew Adolf Michaelis, who has written an exhaustive biography in Allgemeine Deutsche Biographie: Adolf Michaelis (1881). "Jahn, Otto" . Allgemeine Deutsche Biographie (in German). Vol. 13. Leipzig: Duncker & Humblot. pp. 668–686..
