= Hugo Blümner =

German classical scholar

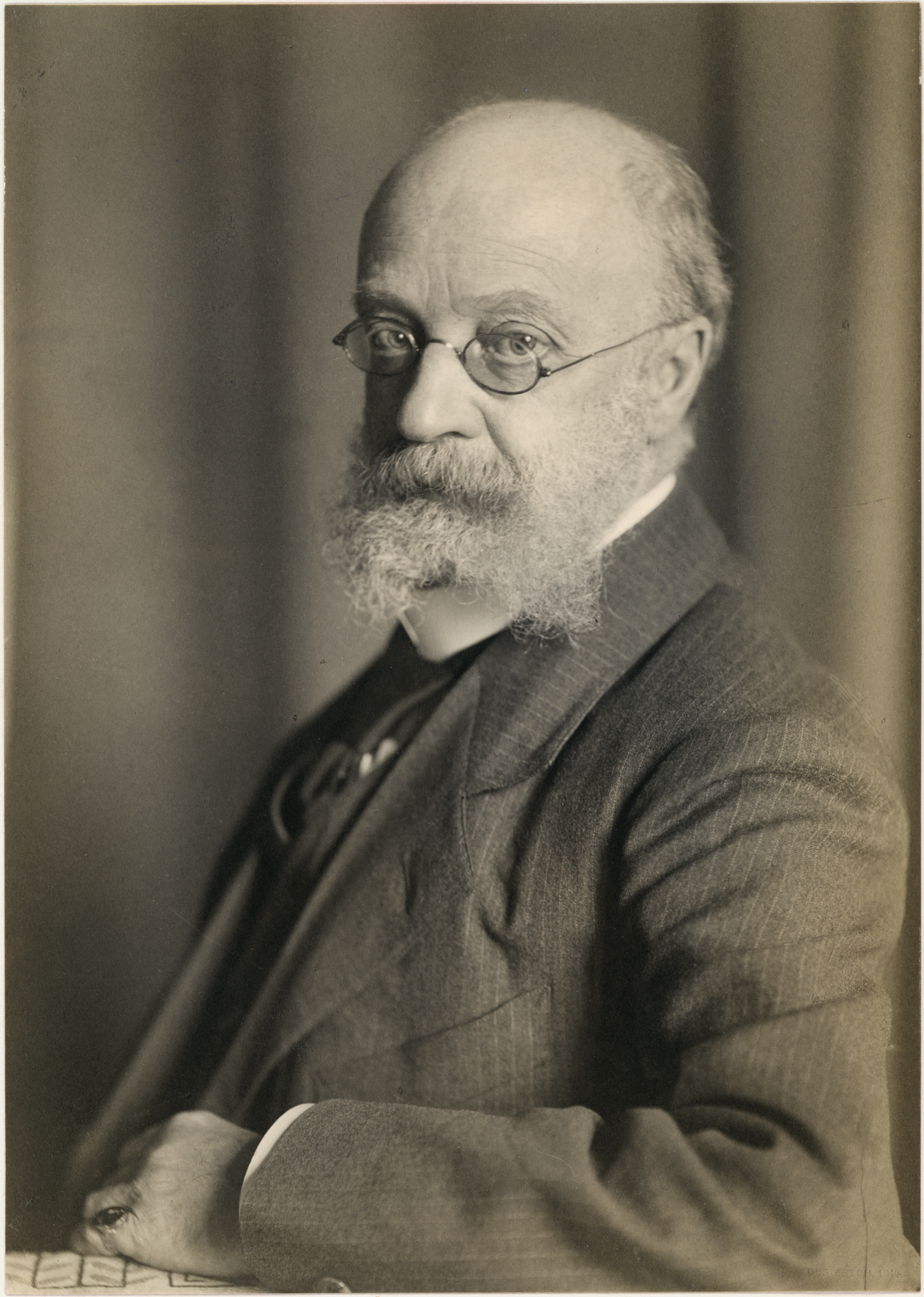
- Born: 9 August 1844
- Died: 1 January 1919 (aged 74)
- Education: University of Bonn, Friedrich-Wilhelms-Universität (Berlin)
- Scientific career
- Workplaces: Schlesische Friedrich-Wilhelms-Universität, University of Königsberg, University of Zurich
- Thesis: De locis Luciani ad artem spectantibus: particula prima (1866)

Signature
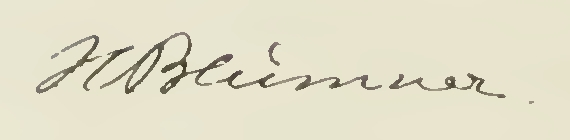

Hugo Blümner (9 August 1844, in Berlin – 1 January 1919, in Zürich) was a German classical archaeologist and philologist.

== Biography ==
Blümner studied with Otto Jahn in Bonn and wrote his doctoral thesis 1866 in Berlin on Lucian. He taught in the universities of Breslau and Königsberg, and after 1877 was professor in the University of Zürich. He is author and editor of many philological and archaeological works, of which the most important are: Die gewerbliche Thätigkeit der Völker des klassischen Altertums (The commercial activities of the peoples of classical history; 1869), Technologie und Terminologie der Gewerbe und Künste bei Griechen und Römern (Technology and terminology of trade and the arts in Greece and Rome; 4 vols., 1874–88), Leben und Sitten der Griechen (Life and customs of the Greeks; 1887), Der Maximaltarif des Diokletian, with Theodor Mommsen (1893) and Pausaniæ Græciæ Descriptio (1896). He revised Hermann's Griechische Privataltertümer (1881) as well.

Among Blümner's doctoral students was the literary scholar and Germanist Emil Ermatinger.
