= Modern Hebrew =

Standard form of the Hebrew language

- Hebrew; Israeli Hebrew
- עברית חדשה 'Ivrit ḥadasha
- The common greeting "Shalom" written in the Hebrew alphabet, including vowel diacritics
- Pronunciation: [ivˈʁit]
- Native to: Israel
- Region: Southern Levant
- Ethnicity: Israeli Jews
- Speakers: 10.6 million (2014): L1: 6.6 million; L2: 4 million
- Language family: Afro-Asiatic: Semitic; West; Central; Northwest; Canaanite; South; Hebrew; Modern Hebrew
- Early forms: Biblical Hebrew: Mishnaic Hebrew; Medieval Hebrew
- Writing system: Hebrew alphabet Hebrew Braille

Official status
- Official language in: Israel
- Regulated by: Academy of the Hebrew Language

Language codes
- ISO 639-1: he
- ISO 639-2: heb
- ISO 639-3: heb
- Glottolog: hebr1245
- Linguasphere: 12-AAB-ab
- IETF: he-IL
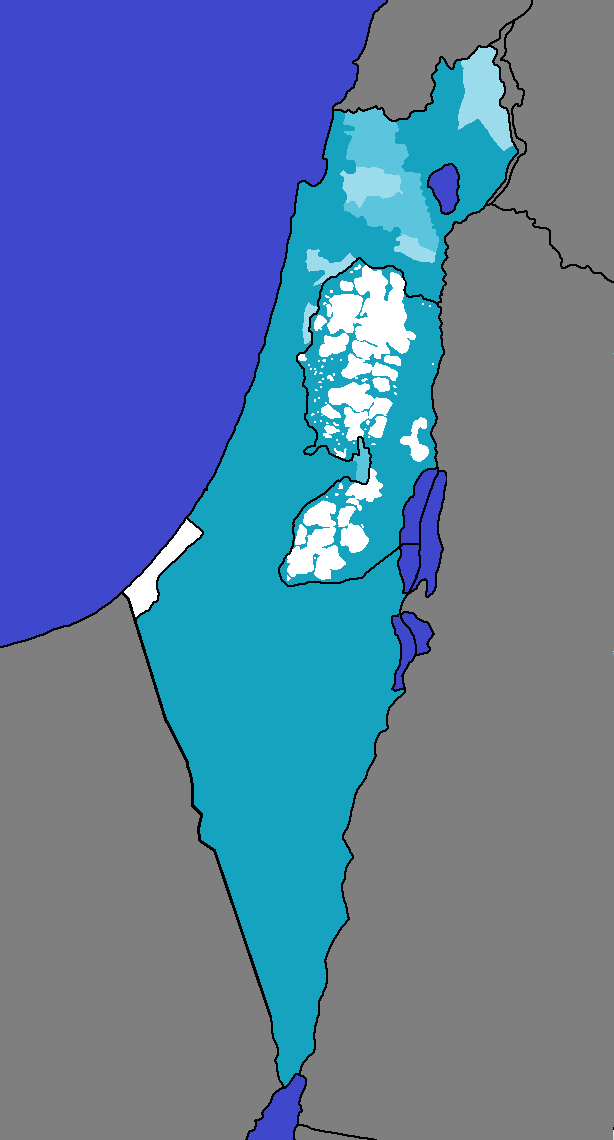
- The Hebrew-speaking world: >50% of the population speaks Hebrew 25–50% of the population speaks Hebrew <25% of the population speaks Hebrew

Modern Hebrew (endonym: עִבְרִית חֲדָשָׁה, romanized: 'Ivrit ḥadasha, IPA: [ivˈʁit χadaˈʃa] or [ʕivˈrit ħadaˈʃa]), also known as Israeli Hebrew or simply Hebrew, is the standard form of the Hebrew language spoken today. It is the only extant Canaanite language of the Semitic branch of the Afroasiatic language family, as well as one of the oldest attested languages to be spoken as a first language in the modern day, on account of Hebrew being attested since the 2nd millennium BC. It uses the Hebrew Alphabet, an abjad script written from right-to-left. The current standard was codified as part of the revival of Hebrew in the late 19th and early 20th centuries, and now serves as the official and national language of the State of Israel, where it is predominantly spoken by its over 10 million people. Thus, Modern Hebrew is nearly universally regarded as the most successful instance of language revitalization in history.

A Northwest Semitic language within the Afroasiatic language family, Hebrew was spoken since antiquity as the vernacular of the Israelites until around the 3rd century BCE, when it was supplanted in the Levant by a western dialect of the Aramaic language and elsewhere by the local or dominant languages of the regions Jews migrated to, and later by Judeo-Arabic, Judaeo-Spanish, Yiddish, and other Jewish languages. Although Hebrew continued to be used for Jewish liturgy, poetry and literature, and written correspondence, it became extinct as a natively spoken language.

By the late 19th century, Russian-Jewish linguist Eliezer Ben-Yehuda had begun a popular movement to revive Hebrew as an everyday language, motivated by his desire to preserve Hebrew literature and establish a distinct Jewish nationality and nationalism in the context of Zionism. Soon after, a large number of Yiddish and Judaeo-Spanish speakers were murdered in the Holocaust or fled to Israel, and many speakers of Judeo-Arabic emigrated to Israel in the Jewish exodus from the Muslim world, where many would adapt to Modern Hebrew.

Currently, Hebrew is spoken by over 10 million people, counting native, fluent, and non-fluent speakers. Over 6.5 million of these speak it as their native language, the overwhelming majority of whom are Jews who were born in Israel. The rest is split: 2 million are immigrants to Israel; 1.5 million are Israeli Arabs, whose first language is usually Arabic; and half a million are expatriate Israelis or diaspora Jews.

Under Israeli law, the organization that officially directs the development of Modern Hebrew is the Academy of the Hebrew Language, headquartered at the Hebrew University of Jerusalem.

== Name ==
The most common scholarly term for the language is "Modern Hebrew" (עברית חדשה). Most people refer to it simply as "Hebrew" (עברית Hebrew pronunciation: [ivˈʁit]).

The term "Modern Hebrew" has been described as "somewhat problematic" as it implies unambiguous periodization from Biblical Hebrew. Haiim B. Rosén (חיים רוזן) supported the now widely used term "Israeli Hebrew" on the basis that it "represented the non-chronological nature of Hebrew". In 1999, Israeli linguist Ghil'ad Zuckermann proposed the term "Israeli" to represent the multiple origins of the language.

== Background ==
The history of the Hebrew language can be divided into four major periods:

- Biblical Hebrew, until about the 3rd century BCE; the language of most of the Hebrew Bible
- Mishnaic Hebrew, the language of the Mishnah and Talmud
- Medieval Hebrew, from about the 6th to the 18th century CE
- Modern Hebrew, from the 19th century to the present, the language of the modern State of Israel

Jewish contemporary sources describe Hebrew flourishing as a spoken language in the kingdoms of Israel and Judah, during about 1200 to 586 BCE. Scholars debate the degree to which Hebrew remained a spoken vernacular following the Babylonian captivity, when Old Aramaic became the predominant international language in the region.

Hebrew died out as a vernacular language somewhere between 200 and 400 CE, declining after the Bar Kokhba revolt of 132–136 CE, which devastated the population of Judea. After the exile, Hebrew became restricted to liturgical and literary use.

== Revival ==
Hebrew had been spoken at various times and for many purposes throughout the Diaspora. During the Old Yishuv, it had developed into a spoken lingua franca among Palestinian Jews. Eliezer Ben-Yehuda then led a revival of the Hebrew language as a mother tongue in the late 19th century and early 20th century.

Modern Hebrew used Biblical Hebrew morphemes, Mishnaic spelling and grammar, and Sephardic pronunciation. Its acceptance by the early Jewish immigrants to Ottoman Palestine was caused primarily by support from the organisations of Edmond James de Rothschild in the 1880s and the official status it received in the 1922 constitution of the British Mandate for Palestine. Ben-Yehuda codified and planned Modern Hebrew using 8,000 words from the Bible and 20,000 words from rabbinical commentaries. Many new words were borrowed from Arabic, due to the language's common Semitic roots with Hebrew, but changed to fit Hebrew phonology and grammar, for example the words gerev (sing.) and garbayim (pl.) are now applied to 'socks', a diminutive of the Arabic ğuwārib ('socks'). In addition, early Jewish immigrants, borrowing from the local Arabs, and later immigrants from Arab lands introduced many nouns as loanwords from Arabic (such as nana, zaatar, mishmish, kusbara, ḥilba, lubiya, hummus, gezer, rayḥan, etc.), as well as much of Modern Hebrew's slang. Despite Ben-Yehuda's fame as the renewer of Hebrew, the most productive renewer of Hebrew words was poet Haim Nahman Bialik.

One of the phenomena seen with the revival of the Hebrew language is that old meanings of nouns were occasionally changed for altogether different meanings, such as bardelas (ברדלס, a loanword from Koine Greek: πάρδαλις, romanized: párdalis, lit. 'leopard, panther'), which in Mishnaic Hebrew meant 'hyena', but in Modern Hebrew it now means 'cheetah'; or shezīf (שזיף) which is now used for 'plum', but formerly meant 'jujube'. The word kishū’īm (formerly 'cucumbers') is now applied to a variety of summer squash (Cucurbita pepo var. cylindrica), a plant native to the New World. Another example is the word kǝvīsh (כביש), which now denotes a street or a road, but is actually an Aramaic adjective meaning 'trodden down' or 'blazed', rather than a common noun. It was originally used to describe a blazed trail. The flower Anemone coronaria, called in Modern Hebrew kalanit (כלנית), was formerly called in Hebrew shoshanat ha-melekh ('the king's flower').

== Classification ==
Modern Hebrew is classified as an Afroasiatic language of the Semitic family, within the Canaanite branch of the Northwest Semitic subgroup. While Modern Hebrew is largely based on Mishnaic and Biblical Hebrew as well as Sephardi and Ashkenazi liturgical and literary tradition from the Medieval and Haskalah eras and retains its Semitic character in its morphology and in much of its syntax, some scholars posit that Modern Hebrew represents a fundamentally new linguistic system, not directly continuing any previous linguistic state, though this is not the consensus among scholars.

The linguists Haiim Rosén and Haim Blanc describe Modern Hebrew to be a koiné language incorporating elements from older periods of Hebrew, early speakers' native languages, as well as new elements created by speakers through natural linguistic evolution. A minority of scholars argue that the revived language had been so influenced by various substrate languages that it is genealogically a hybrid with Indo-European. These theories are controversial and have not been met with general acceptance, and the consensus among a majority of scholars is that Modern Hebrew, despite its non-Semitic influences, can correctly be classified as a Semitic language.

== Alphabet ==
Modern Hebrew is written from right to left using the Hebrew alphabet, which is an abjad, a consonant-only script of 22 letters, based on the "square" letter form known as Ashurit (Assyrian), which was developed from the Aramaic script. A cursive script is used in handwriting. When necessary, vowels are indicated by diacritic marks above or below the letters known as niqqud, or by use of matres lectionis, which are consonantal letters used as vowels. Further diacritics like Dagesh and Sin and Shin dots are used to indicate variations in the pronunciation of the consonants (e.g. bet/vet, shin/sin). The letters "צ׳", "ג׳", "ז׳", each modified with a Geresh, represent the consonants [t͡ʃ], [d͡ʒ], [ʒ]. The consonant [t͡ʃ] may also be written as "תש" and "טש". [w] is represented interchangeably by a simple vav "ו", non-standard double vav "וו" and sometimes by non-standard geresh modified vav "ו׳".

Name	Alef	Bet	Gimel	Dalet	He	Vav	Zayin	Chet	Tet	Yod	Kaf	Lamed	Mem	Nun	Samech	Ayin	Pe	Tzadi	Qof	Resh	Shin	Tav
Printed letter	א	ב	ג	ד	ה	ו	ז	ח	ט	י	כ ך	ל	מ ם	נ ן	ס	ע	פ ף	צ ץ	ק	ר	ש	ת
Cursive letter																						
Pronunciation	/ʔ/, /∅/	/b/, /v/	/g/	/d/	/h/	/v/ /u/, /o/, /w/	/z/	/χ~ħ/	/t/	/j/, /i/, /e(i̯)/	/k/, /χ/	/l/	/m/	/n/	/s/	/ʔ~ʕ/, /∅/	/p/, /f/	/t͡s/	/k/	/ʁ~r/	/ʃ/, /s/	/t/
Transliteration	', ∅	b, v	g	d	h	v, u, o, w	z	kh, ch, h	t	y, i, e, ei	k, kh	l	m	n	s	', ∅	p, f	ts, tz	k	r	sh, s	t

== Phonology ==
Modern Hebrew has fewer phonemes than Biblical Hebrew but it has developed its own phonological complexity. Israeli Hebrew has 25 to 27 consonants, depending on whether the speaker has pharyngeals. It has 5 to 10 vowels, depending on whether diphthongs and vowels are counted, varying with the speaker and the analysis.

== Morphology ==
Modern Hebrew morphology (formation, structure, and interrelationship of words in a language) is essentially that of Biblical Hebrew. Modern Hebrew showcases much of the inflectional morphology of the classical upon which it was based. In the formation of new words, all verbs and the majority of nouns and adjectives are formed by the classically Semitic devices of triconsonantal roots (shoresh) with affixed patterns (mishkal). Mishnaic attributive patterns are often used to create nouns, and Classical patterns are often used to create adjectives. Blended words are created by merging two bound stems or parts of words.

== Syntax ==
The syntax of Modern Hebrew is mainly Mishnaic but also shows the influence of different contact languages to which its speakers have been exposed during the revival period and over the past century.

=== Word order ===
The word order of Modern Hebrew is predominately SVO (subject–verb–object). Biblical Hebrew was originally VSO (verb–subject–object), but drifted into SVO. In the modern language, a sentence may correctly be arranged in any order but its meaning might be hard to understand unless אֶת is used. Modern Hebrew maintains classical syntactic properties associated with VSO languages: it is prepositional, rather than postpositional, in marking case and adverbial relations, auxiliary verbs precede main verbs; main verbs precede their complements, and noun modifiers (adjectives, determiners other than the definite article ה- (ha), and noun adjuncts) follow the head noun; and in genitive constructions, the possessee noun precedes the possessor. Moreover, Modern Hebrew allows and sometimes requires sentences with a predicate initial.

== Sample text ==
From Article 1 of the Universal Declaration of Human Rights
Modern Hebrew	Transliteration	English
כׇּל בְּנֵי הָאָדָם נוֹלְדוּ בְּנֵי חוֹרִין וְשָׁוִים בְּעֶרְכָּם וּבִזְכֻיּוֹתֵיהֶם. כֻּלָּם חוֹנְנוּ בִּתְבוּנָה וְּבְמַצְפּוּן, לְפִיכָךְ חוֹבָה עֲלֵיהֶם לִנְהֹג אִישׁ בְּרֵעֵהוּ בְּרוּחַ שֶׁל אַחֲוָה.	Kol bnei ha'adam noldu bnei chorin veshavim be'erkam uvizchuyoteihem. Kulam chonenu bitvunah uvematzpun, lefichach chovah 'alehem linhog 'ish bere'ehu beruach shel achavah.	All human beings are born free and equal in dignity and rights. They are endowed with reason and conscience and should act towards one another in a spirit of brotherhood.

== Lexicon ==
Modern Hebrew has expanded its vocabulary effectively to meet the needs of casual vernacular, of science and technology, of journalism and belles-lettres. According to Ghil'ad Zuckermann:

The number of attested Biblical Hebrew words is 8198, of which some 2000 are hapax legomena (the number of Biblical Hebrew roots, on which many of these words are based, is 2099). The number of attested Rabbinic Hebrew words is less than 20,000, of which (i) 7879 are Rabbinic par excellence, i.e. they did not appear in the Old Testament (the number of new Rabbinic Hebrew roots is 805); (ii) around 6000 are a subset of Biblical Hebrew; and (iii) several thousand are Aramaic words which can have a Hebrew form. Medieval Hebrew added 6421 words to (Modern) Hebrew. The approximate number of new lexical items in Israeli is 17,000 (cf. 14,762 in Even-Shoshan 1970 [...]). With the inclusion of foreign and technical terms [...], the total number of Israeli words, including words of biblical, rabbinic and medieval descent, is more than 60,000.

=== Loanwords ===
Modern Hebrew has loanwords from Arabic (both from the local Palestinian dialect and from the dialects of Jewish immigrants from Arab countries), Aramaic, Yiddish, Judaeo-Spanish, German, Polish, Russian, English and other languages. Simultaneously, Israeli Hebrew makes use of words that were originally loanwords from the languages of surrounding nations from ancient times: Canaanite languages as well as Akkadian. Mishnaic Hebrew borrowed many nouns from Aramaic (including Persian words borrowed by Aramaic), as well as from Greek and to a lesser extent Latin. In the Middle Ages, Hebrew made heavy semantic borrowing from Arabic, especially in the fields of science and philosophy. Here are typical examples of Hebrew loanwords:

loanword			derivatives			origin		
Hebrew	IPA	meaning	Hebrew	IPA	meaning	language	spelling	meaning
בַּי	/baj/	goodbye				English	bye	
אֶגְזוֹז	/eɡˈzoz/	exhaust system				English	exhaust system	
דיג׳יי	/ˈdidʒej/	DJ	דיג׳ה	/diˈdʒe/	to DJ	English	to DJ	
וַאלְלָה	/ˈwala/	really!?				Arabic	والله	really!?
כֵּיף	/kef/	fun	כִּיֵּף	/kiˈjef/	to have fun	Arabic	كيف	pleasure
תַּאֲרִיךְ	/taʔaˈʁiχ/	date	תִּאֲרֵךְ	/tiʔaˈʁeχ/	to date (establish the age of)	Arabic	تاريخ	date, history
חְנוּן	/χnun/	geek, wimp, nerd, "square"				Moroccan Arabic	خنونة	snot
אַבָּא	/ˈaba/	dad				Aramaic	אבא	the father/my father
דוּגרִי	/ˈdugʁi/	forthright				Ottoman Turkish	طوغری doğrı	correct
פַּרְדֵּס	/paʁˈdes/	orchard				Avestan	𐬞𐬀𐬌𐬭𐬌⸱𐬛𐬀𐬉𐬰𐬀	garden
אֲלַכְסוֹן	/alaχˈson/	diagonal				Greek	λοξός	slope
וִילוֹן	/viˈlon/	curtain				Latin	vēlum	veil, curtain
חַלְטוּרָה	/χalˈtuʁa/	shoddy job	חִלְטֵר	/χilˈteʁ/	to moonlight	Russian	халтура	shoddy work
בָּלָגָן	/balaˈɡan/	mess	בִּלְגֵּן	/bilˈɡen/	to make a mess	Russian	балаган	chaos
תַּכְלֶ׳ס	/ˈtaχles/	directly/ essentially				Yiddish from Hebrew	תכלית	purpose, goal (Hebrew word, only pronunciation is Yiddish)
חְרוֹפּ	/χʁop/	deep sleep	חָרַפּ	/χaˈʁap/	to sleep deeply	Yiddish	כראָפ	snore
שְׁפַּכְטֵל	/ˈʃpaχtel/	putty knife				German	Spachtel	putty knife
גּוּמִי	/ˈɡumi/	rubber	גּוּמִיָּה	/ɡumiˈja/	rubber band	German	Gummi	rubber
גָּזוֹז	/ɡaˈzoz/	carbonated beverage				Turkish from French	gazoz from eau gazeuse	carbonated beverage
פּוּסְטֵמָה	/pusˈtema/	stupid woman				Ladino	פּוֹשׂטֵימה postema	inflamed wound
אַדְרִיכָל	/adʁiˈχal/	architect	אַדְרִיכָלוּת	/adʁiχaˈlut/	architecture	Akkadian	𒀵𒂍𒃲	temple servant
צִי	/t͡si/	fleet				Ancient Egyptian	ḏꜣy	ship

== See also ==
- Biblical Hebrew

== Bibliography ==
- Choueka, Yaakov (1997). Rav-Milim: A comprehensive dictionary of Modern Hebrew. Tel Aviv: CET. ISBN 978-965-448-323-0.
- Ben-Ḥayyim, Ze'ev (1992). The Struggle for a Language. Jerusalem: The Academy of the Hebrew Language.
- Dekel, Nurit (2014). Colloquial Israeli Hebrew: A Corpus-based Survey. De Gruyter. ISBN 978-3-11-037725-5.
- Gila Freedman Cohen; Carmia Shoval (2011). Easing Into Modern Hebrew Grammar: A User-friendly Reference and Exercise Book. Magnes Press. ISBN 978-965-493-601-9.
- Shlomo Izreʾel; Shlomo Raz (1996). Studies in Modern Semitic Languages. BRILL. ISBN 978-90-04-10646-8.
- Matras, Yaron; Schiff, Leora (2005). "Spoken Israeli Hebrew revisited: Structures and variation" (PDF). Studia Semitica. 16: 145–193.
- Ornan, Uzzi (2003). "The Final Word: Mechanism for Hebrew Word Generation". Hebrew Studies. 45. Haifa University: 285–287. JSTOR 27913706.
- Bergsträsser, Gotthelf (1983). Peter T. Daniels (ed.). Introduction to the Semitic Languages: Text Specimens and Grammatical Sketches. Eisenbrauns. ISBN 978-0-931464-10-2.
- Haiim B. Rosén [in Hebrew] (1962). A Textbook of Israeli Hebrew. University of Chicago Press. ISBN 978-0-226-72603-8.
- Stefan Weninger (23 December 2011). The Semitic Languages: An International Handbook. Walter de Gruyter. ISBN 978-3-11-025158-6.
- Wexler, Paul (1990). The Schizoid Nature of Modern Hebrew: A Slavic Language in Search of a Semitic Past. Otto Harrassowitz Verlag. ISBN 978-3-447-03063-2.
- Zuckermann, Ghil'ad (2003). Language Contact and Lexical Enrichment in Israeli Hebrew. UK: Palgrave Macmillan. ISBN 978-1403917232.
