= Ghil'ad Zuckermann =

Language revivalist and linguist (born 1971)

- גלעד צוקרמן
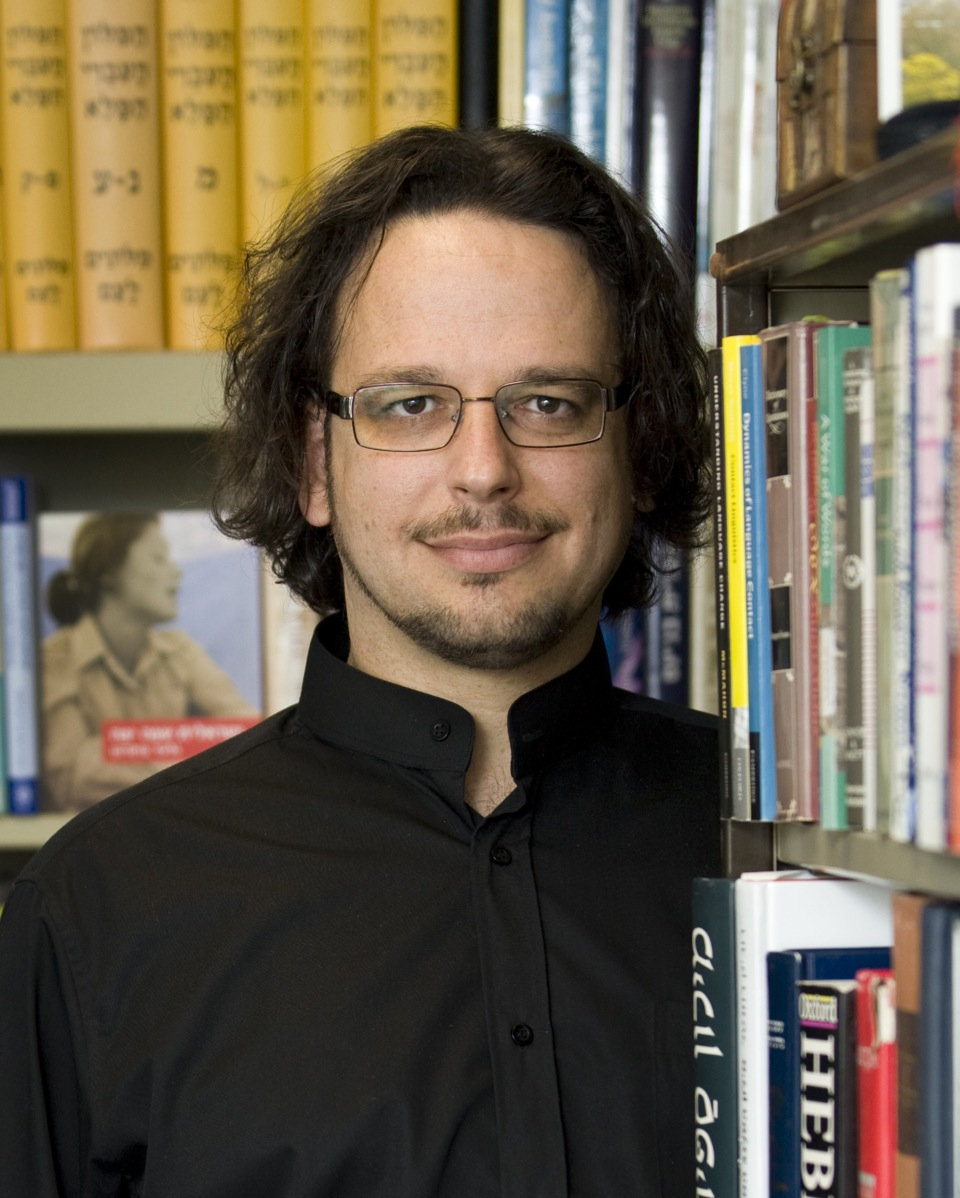
- Zuckermann in 2011
- Born: 1 June 1971 (age 55); Tel Aviv, Israel
- Education: University of Oxford (DPhil); University of Cambridge (PhD); Tel Aviv University (MA); United World College of the Adriatic
- Known for: Hybridic theory of Israeli Hebrew, Classification of camouflaged borrowing, Phono-semantic matching, Revivalistics, Language reclamation and mental health
- Awards: Rubinlicht Prize (2023), President of the Australian Association for Jewish Studies (since 2017), Chair of the Jury for the Jeonju International Awards for Promoting Intangible Cultural Heritage (since 2024)
- Scientific career
- Fields: Linguistics, Revivalistics
- Workplaces: Churchill College, Cambridge; The University of Queensland; The University of Adelaide; Flinders University

Ghil'ad Zuckermann (Hebrew: גלעד צוקרמן, pronounced [ɡilˈ(ʔ)ad ˈt͡sukeʁman]; 1 June 1971) is an Israeli language revivalist and linguist who works in contact linguistics, lexicology and the study of language, culture and identity.

Zuckermann was awarded the Rubinlicht Prize (2023) "for his research on the profound influence of Yiddish on modern Hebrew", and listed among Australia's top 30 "living legends of research" (2024) by The Australian.

He is the Chair of the Jury for the Jeonju International Awards for Promoting Intangible Cultural Heritage (since 2024).

== Overview ==
Zuckermann was born in Tel Aviv in 1971, was raised in Eilat, and attended the United World College (UWC) of the Adriatic in 1987–1989. In 1997 he received an M.A. in Linguistics from the Adi Lautman Program at Tel Aviv University. In 1997–2000 he was Scatcherd European Scholar of the University of Oxford and Denise Skinner Graduate Scholar at St Hugh's College, receiving a D.Phil. (Oxon.) in 2000. While at Oxford, he served as president of the Jewish student group L'Chaim Society. As Gulbenkian research fellow at Churchill College (2000–2004), he was affiliated with the Department of Linguistics, Faculty of Modern and Medieval Studies, University of Cambridge. He received a titular Ph.D. (Cantab.) in 2003.

Zuckermann is a hyperpolyglot, with his past professorships ranging across universities in England, China, Australia, Singapore, Slovakia, Israel, and the United States. In 2010–2015 he was China's Ivy League Project 211 "Distinguished Visiting Professor", and "Shanghai Oriental Scholar" professorial fellow, at Shanghai International Studies University.

He was Australian Research Council (ARC) Discovery Fellow in 2007–2011, and National Health and Medical Research Council (NHMRC) grant holder in 2017–2021, studying the effects of Indigenous language reclamation on wellbeing. He was awarded a British Academy Research Grant, Memorial Foundation of Jewish Culture Postdoctoral Fellowship, Harold Hyam Wingate Scholarship and Chevening Scholarship.

He is elected member of the Australian Institute of Aboriginal and Torres Strait Islander Studies (AIATSIS) and the Foundation for Endangered Languages. He serves as editorial board member of the Journal of Language Contact (Brill), International Academic Board Advisor of the Institute for the Study of Global Antisemitism and Policy, board member of the Online Museum of Jewish Theatre, and expert witness in trademarks and forensic linguistics.

Since February 2017 Zuckermann has been President of the Australian Association for Jewish Studies (AAJS). In 2013–2015 he was President of the Australasian Association of Lexicography (AustraLex). In 2011–2024 he was Professor of Linguistics and Chair of Endangered Languages at the University of Adelaide, and has since moved to Flinders University. He is also Adjunct Professor at the Australian Catholic University.

=== Research ===
Zuckermann applies insights from the Hebrew revival to the revitalization of Aboriginal languages in Australia. According to Yuval Rotem, the Israeli Ambassador to Australia, Zuckermann's "passion for the reclamation, maintenance and empowerment of Aboriginal languages and culture inspired [him] and was indeed the driving motivator of" the establishment of the Allira Aboriginal Knowledge IT Centre in Dubbo, New South Wales, Australia, on 2 September 2010.

He proposes Native Tongue Title, compensation for language loss, because "linguicide" results in "loss of cultural autonomy, loss of spiritual and intellectual sovereignty, loss of soul". He uses the term sleeping beauty to refer to a no-longer spoken language and urges Australia "to define the 330 Aboriginal languages, most of them sleeping beauties, as the official languages of their region", and to introduce bilingual signs and thus change the linguistic landscape of the country. "So, for example, Port Lincoln should also be referred to as Galinyala, which is its original Barngarla name."

Zuckermann proposes a controversial hybrid theory of the emergence of Israeli Hebrew according to which Hebrew and Yiddish "acted equally" as the "primary contributors" to Modern Hebrew. Scholars including Yiddish linguist Dovid Katz (who refers to Zuckermann as a "fresh-thinking Israeli scholar") adopt Zuckermann's term "Israeli" and accept his notion of hybridity. Others, for example author and translator Hillel Halkin, oppose Zuckermann's model. In an article published on 24 December 2004 in The Jewish Daily Forward, pseudonymous column "Philologos", Halkin accused Zuckermann of a political agenda. Zuckermann's response was published on 28 December 2004 in The Mendele Review: Yiddish Literature and Language.

=== Reclamation of Barngarla ===
On 14 September 2011 Zuckermann started working with the Barngarla community to reclaim the Barngarla language, based on the documentation of German Lutheran pastor Clamor Wilhelm Schürmann, who had worked at a mission in 1844 and created a Barngarla dictionary. This led to ongoing language revival workshops being held in Port Augusta, Whyalla, and Port Lincoln several times each year, with funding from the federal government's Indigenous Languages Support program.

Zuckermann co-developed a Barngarla Dictionary app and co-authored a Barngarla trilogy: Barngarlidhi Manoo ("Speaking Barngarla Together": Barngarla Alphabet & Picture Book; with the Barngarla community, 2019); Mangiri Yarda ("Healthy Country": Barngarla Wellbeing and Nature; with Barngarla woman Emmalene Richards, 2021); and Wardlada Mardinidhi ("Bush Healing": Barngarla Plant Medicines; with Barngarla woman Evelyn Walker, 2023).

He has been involved in the revival of other Aboriginal languages such as Bayoongoo, Western Australia, and has been the founder and convener of the Adelaide Language Festival.

== Contributions to linguistics ==
Zuckermann's research focuses on contact linguistics, lexicology, revivalistics, Jewish languages, and the study of language, culture and identity.

He argues that Israeli Hebrew, which he calls "Israeli", is a hybrid language that is genetically both Indo-European (Germanic, Slavic and Romance) and Afro-Asiatic (Semitic). He suggests that "Israeli" is the continuation not only of literary Hebrew(s) but also of Yiddish, as well as Polish, Russian, German, English, Ladino, Arabic and other languages spoken by Hebrew revivalists. His hybridic synthesis is in contrast to both the traditional revival thesis (i.e. that "Israeli" is Hebrew) and the relexification antithesis (i.e. that "Israeli" is Yiddish with Hebrew words).

Zuckermann introduces revivalistics as a new transdisciplinary field of enquiry surrounding language reclamation (e.g. Barngarla), revitalization (e.g. Adnyamathanha) and reinvigoration (e.g. Irish).

His analysis of multisourced neologization (the coinage of words deriving from two or more sources at the same time) challenges Einar Haugen's classic typology of lexical borrowing. Whereas Haugen categorizes borrowing into either substitution or importation, Zuckermann explores cases of "simultaneous substitution and importation" in the form of camouflaged borrowing. He proposes a new classification of multisourced neologisms such as phono-semantic matching.

Zuckermann's exploration of phono-semantic matching in Standard Mandarin and Meiji period Japanese concludes that the Chinese writing system is multifunctional: pleremic ("full" of meaning, e.g. logographic), cenemic ("empty" of meaning, e.g. phonographic – like a syllabary) and simultaneously cenemic and pleremic (phono-logographic). He argues that Leonard Bloomfield's assertion that "a language is the same no matter what system of writing may be used" is inaccurate. "If Chinese had been written using roman letters, thousands of Chinese words would not have been coined, or would have been coined with completely different forms".

== Selected publications ==
=== Books authored ===
- 多源造词研究 (Multisourced Neologization). Shanghai: East China Normal University Press. 2021. ISBN 9787567598935.
- Revivalistics: From the Genesis of Israeli to Language Reclamation in Australia and Beyond. New York: Oxford University Press, 2020. ISBN 9780199812790 / ISBN 9780199812776.
- ישראלית שפה יפה (Israeli – A Beautiful Language). Tel Aviv: Am Oved. 2008. ISBN 9789651319631. (Israelit Safa Yafa)
- Language Contact and Lexical Enrichment in Israeli Hebrew. Palgrave Macmillan, 2003. ISBN 9781403917232 / ISBN 9781403938695.

=== Books edited ===
- Jewish Language Contact (Special Issue of the International Journal of the Sociology of Language, Vol. 226), 2014.
- Burning Issues in Afro-Asiatic Linguistics, 2012. ISBN 144384070X / ISBN 9781443840705.

=== Journal articles and book chapters ===
- Næssan, P; Zuckermann, G (2022). "Barngarla place names and regions in South Australia". Australian Journal of Linguistics. 42 (1): 24–56. doi:10.1080/07268602.2022.2052015.
- ""Language Breathes Life": Barngarla Community Perspectives on the Wellbeing Impacts of Reclaiming a Dormant Australian Aboriginal Language" (PDF). International Journal of Environmental Research and Public Health. 16 (3918): 1–17. 2019.
- Zuckermann, Ghil'ad (2003). "Language Contact and Globalisation: The Camouflaged Influence of English on the World's Languages – with special attention to Israeli (sic) and Mandarin" (PDF). Cambridge Review of International Affairs. 16 (2): 287–307. doi:10.1080/09557570302045. S2CID 11791518.
- "Cultural Hybridity: Multisourced Neologization in "Reinvented" Languages and in Languages with "Phono-Logographic" Script" (PDF). Languages in Contrast. 4: 281–318. 2004. doi:10.1075/lic.4.2.06zuc.
- "A New Vision for "Israeli Hebrew": Theoretical and Practical Implications of Analysing Israel's Main Language as a Semi-Engineered Semito-European Hybrid Language" (PDF). Journal of Modern Jewish Studies. 5: 57–71. 2006. doi:10.1080/14725880500511175. S2CID 14682166.
- Zuckermann, Ghil'ad (2009). "Hybridity versus Revivability: Multiple Causation, Forms and Patterns" (PDF). Journal of Language Contact. 2 (2): 40–67. doi:10.1163/000000009792497788.
- Zuckermann, Ghil'ad; Walsh, Michael (2011). "Stop, Revive, Survive: Lessons from the Hebrew Revival Applicable to the Reclamation, Maintenance and Empowerment of Aboriginal Languages and Cultures" (PDF). Australian Journal of Linguistics. 31: 111–127. doi:10.1080/07268602.2011.532859. S2CID 145627187.
- Zuckermann, Ghil'ad; Quer, Giovanni; Shakuto, Shiori (2014). "Native Tongue Title: Proposed Compensation for the Loss of Aboriginal Languages". Australian Aboriginal Studies. 2014/1: 55–71.
- Zuckermann, Ghil'ad; Walsh, Michael (2014). ""Our Ancestors Are Happy!": Revivalistics in the Service of Indigenous Wellbeing". Foundation for Endangered Languages. XVIII: 113–119.
- Zuckermann, Ghil'ad (2006). ""Etymythological Othering" and the Power of "Lexical Engineering" in Judaism, Islam and Christianity. A Socio-Philo(sopho)logical Perspective" (PDF). In Tope Omoniyi; Joshua A Fishman (eds.). Explorations in the Sociology of Language and Religion. Amsterdam: John Benjamins. pp. 237–258.

=== Other publications ===
- Online Dictionary of the Barngarla Aboriginal Language, 2018.
- Engaging – A Guide to Interacting Respectfully and Reciprocally with Aboriginal and Torres Strait Islander People, and their Arts Practices and Intellectual Property, 2015.

== Filmography ==
- Fry's Planet Word, Stephen Fry interviews Zuckermann about the revival of Hebrew
- The Politics of Language, Stephen Fry interviews Zuckermann about language
- SBS: Living Black: S18 Ep9 - Linguicide
- Babbel: Why Revive A Dead Language? - Interview with Ghil'ad Zuckermann
- edX MOOC: Language Revival: Securing the Future of Endangered Languages
- The Israeli Language: Hebrew Revived or Yiddish Survived? PART 1
- The Israeli Language: Hebrew Revived or Yiddish Survived? PART 2
- The Israeli Language: Hebrew Revived or Yiddish Survived? PART 3
