= Harald Burger =

Swiss-German linguist

- Born: 1940 (age 85–86); Duisburg
- Education: University of Zurich
- Scientific career
- Fields: Linguistics
- Workplaces: University of Zurich
- Doctoral advisor: Max Wehrli
- Doctoral students: Jürg Häusermann

Harald Burger (born 1940 in Duisburg) is a Swiss-German linguist. He received his Ph.D. in 1964 at the University of Zurich. (His dissertation Belisarius: Edition und Versuch einer Deutung is a study about the baroque author Jacob Bidermann). In 1975 Burger was appointed full professor of Germanic philology.

In 1990 Harald Burger was naturalized in Switzerland. In 2006 he became professor emeritus.

== Works ==
- Mediensprache. Eine Einführung in Sprache und Kommunikationsformen der Massenmedien. 3rd edition. De Gruyter, Berlin/New York 2005, ISBN 3-11-017353-0,
- Phraseologie. Eine Einführung am Beispiel des Deutschen. 4th edition. Erich Schmidt, Berlin 2010, ISBN 978-3-503-12204-2.
