= Barngarla people =

Aboriginal people of Australia

Barngarla
Barngarlidi

Regions with significant populations
- South Australia: unknown

Languages
- Barngarla; English (Australian English, Australian Aboriginal English)

Religion
- Traditional, Christianity

Related ethnic groups
- Nauo, Adnyamathanha

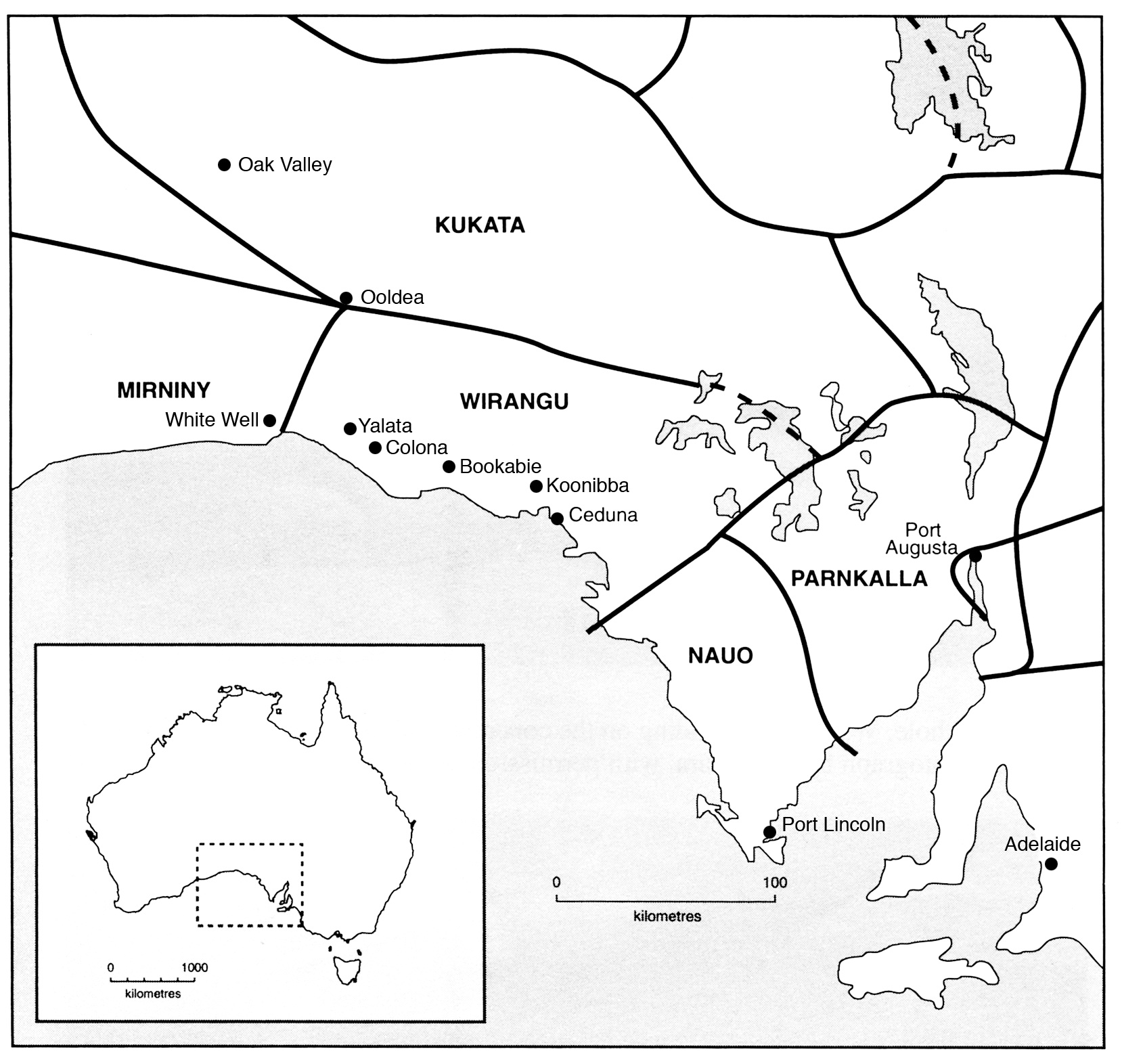
Aboriginal languages of South Australia. (Note: Tribal boundaries, after Tindale (1974), adapted from Hercus (1999).)

The Barngarla (historically also spelled as Parnkalla or Pangkala) are an Indigenous people of South Australia and the traditional owners of much of Eyre Peninsula. Their language, Barngarla is a Yura language and part of a revival effort by the University of Adelaide.

Their traditional land encompassed much of the upper Eyre peninsula, including Port Lincoln, Whyalla and the lands west of Port Augusta. The Barngarla people traditionally lived by the coast and visited inland seasonally and for ceremonial and special purposes. The Barngarla native title claim compromises 44,481 square km, or about two-thirds of the Eyre peninsula. In 2015 this claim was upheld and in 2023 the Barngarla people won a federal court decision to prevent a nuclear waste disposal facility from being built on their land.

Barngarla people traditionally wore cloaks made from kangaroo skin and mainly hunted for seafood, but also caught kangaroo, emu, snakes and various lizards depending on seasonality. Nondo beans (thought to be Acacia sophorae seeds) and pigface (carpobrotus modestus) were especially prized food items. a book entitled Wardlada Mardinidhi documents the location and names of Barngarla medical plants.

Barngarla Dreaming is heavily centred on a large mythic complex known as the Seven Sisters. The primary male spiritual figure in that narrative is named Yulanya from which the Uley, Yeelanna, Yallunda Flat, along with the smaller localities of Yallunna, Yulina, and Palanna Fountain on the Eyre Peninsula derive their names.

A practice known as "singing to the sharks" was an important ritual in Barngarla culture. The performance consisted of men lining the cliffs of bays in the Eyre peninsula and singing out, while their chants were accompanied by women dancing on the beach. The aim was to enlist sharks and dolphins in driving shoals of fish towards the shore where fishers in the shallows could make their catch.

Just prior to invasion by the English settlers, the Barngarla were under pressure from the Kokatha, who were on the move southwards, forcing the Barngarla to retreat from their traditional northern boundaries. One effect was to cut off their access to certain woods used in spear-making, so that they finally had to forage as far as Tumby Bay to get supplies of whipstick mallee ash.

The Barngarla and Nauo people were engaged in more clashes with European settlers then any other people in South Australia following the colonisation of the state. During the decade following the establishment of Port Lincoln in 1839 the Barngarla attacked pastoral stations with local settlers conducting vigilante killings and police retaliating indiscriminately. This undeclared war between white sellers and the Barngarla people continued until at least 1862. Barngarla people are one of the many indigenous groups which contain an oral-history of the Waterloo Bay massacre, where up to 260 Barngarla, Nauo, Kokatha and Wirangu may have been driven off cliffs into the sea.

In 1850 both the Barngarla School, operated by Clamor Wilhelm Schürmann, and the first Anglican mission were set up at Poonindie on the Tod River within Barngarla land. Living conditions at Pooninidie were basic with no running water, over-crowding and a lack of food and medicine. In 1894, the mission had closed and the majority of residents were moved onto Point Pearce and Point McLeay missions, although some stayed on their land. The Barngarla community was deeply affected by the Aborigines Act 1911 which led to the Stolen Generations and the loss of Barngarla as a first language.

== Language ==
Barngarla was the dominant language of the Eyre Peninsula prior to European settlement. the last fluent speaker was reported to have died in the 1960s, although some Barngarla members of the Stolen Generation retained knowledge of their language through lyrics in songs.

Israeli linguist Professor Ghil'ad Zuckermann contacted the Barngarla community in 2011 proposing to revive it, the project of reclamation being accepted enthusiastically by people of Barngarla descent. Workshops to this end were started in Port Lincoln, Whyalla and Port Augusta in 2012. The reclamation is based on 170-year-old documents.

== Country ==
In Tindale's estimation, the Barngarla's traditional lands covered some 17,500 square miles (45,000 km^{2}), around the eastern side of Lake Torrens south of Edeowie and west of Hookina and Port Augusta. The western reaches extended as far as Island Lagoon and Yardea. Woorakimba, Hesso, Yudnapinna, and the Gawler Ranges are formed part of Barngarla lands. The southern frontier lay around Kimba, Darke Peak, Cleve, and Franklin Harbour.

== Social organisation ==
The Barngarla had two tribal divisions: the northern Wartabanggala ranged from north of Port Augusta to Ogden Hill and the vicinity of Quorn and Beltana; a southern branch, the Malkaripangala, lived down the western side of the Spencer Gulf. Referred to as Pangkala, the Barngarla have also been included in the grouping currently known as the Adnyamathanha people.

In 1844 the missionary C. W. Schürmann stated that the Barngarla were divided into two classes, the Mattiri and Karraru. This was criticized by the ethnographer R. H. Mathews, who, surveying South Australian tribes, argued that Schürmann had mixed them up, and that the proper divisions, which he called phratries shared by all these tribes was as follows:

Phratry	Husband	Wife	Offspring
A	Kirrarroo	Matturri	Matturri
B	Matturri	Kirraroo	Kirraroo

The Barngarla practised both circumcision and subincision.

== Barngarla native title ==
On 22 January 2015 the Barngarla people were granted native title over much of Eyre Peninsula. They had applied for 44,500 square kilometres (11,000,000 acres) and received most of it. (Note: Judge Mansfield wrote:'The fact that Barngarla language is now being relearnt by some claimants, due to the work of Adelaide University academic Ghil'ad Zuckermann, is not evidence of continuity of the Barngarla language, although it is evidence of continuity of a notion of Barngarla identity, a notion that clearly existed amongst the Barngarla community at 1846, when Barngarla people told Schürmann of the "Barngarla matta", and which can thus be inferred to have existed at sovereignty.' (Mansfield 2015))

On 24 September 2021 they were granted native title over the city of Port Augusta, after a protracted 25-year old battle. Justice Natalie Charlesworth presided over the sitting.

== Alternative names ==
- Arkaba-tura (men of Arkaba, a toponym)
- Bangala, Bungela
- Banggala, Bahngala
- Bungeha
- Jadliaura people
- Kooapidna
- Kooapudna (Franklin Harbour horde)
- Kortabina (toponym)
- Pamkala
- Pankalla, Parnkalla, Parn-kal-la, Pankarla
- Punkalla
- Punkirla
- Wanbirujurari ("men of the seacoast", northern tribal term for southern hordes)
- Willara
- Willeuroo ("west"/ "westerner")

== Some words ==
- babi "father"
- gadalyili, goonya, walgara "shark" (Note: These three distinct terms for the one species are thought to have designated nuances whose differential meanings are no longer known (Goldsworthy 2014).)
- goordnidi "native dog"
- ngami "mother"
- yangkunnu "Pink cockatoo"
- wilga "domesticated dog"

Barngarla has four grammatical numbers: singular, dual, plural and superplural. For instance:

- wárraidya "emu" (singular)
- wárraidyailyarranha "a lot of emus", "heaps of emus" (superplural)
- wárraidyalbili "two emus" (dual)
- wárraidyarri "emus" (plural)

== Sources ==
- Anderson, Lainie (6 May 2012). "Australia's unspeakable indigenous tragedy". The Punch.
- Angas, George French (1847). Savage life and scenes in Australia and New Zealand: being an artist's impressions of countries and people at the Antipodes (PDF). Vol. 1, 2. London: Smith, Elder & Co – via Internet Archive.
- Atkinson, Stephen (20 September 2013). "Language lost and regained". The Australian. Archived from the original on 20 September 2013.
- Bryant, James (1879). "Gawler Ranges". In Taplin, George (ed.). Folklore, manners, customs and languages of the South Australian aborigines (PDF). Adelaide: E Spiller, Acting Government Printer. p. 103 – via Internet Archive.
- Clendon, Mark (2015). Clamor Schürmann's Barngarla grammar: A commentary on the first section of A vocabulary of the Parnkalla language. University of Adelaide Press. ISBN 978-1-925-26111-0.
- Eylmann, Erhard (1908). Die Eingeborenen der Kolonie Südaustralien (PDF). Berlin: D.Reimer – via Internet Archive.
- Gage, Nicola; Whiting, Natalie (28 January 2015). "Barngarla people granted partial native title over large area of SA Eyre Peninsula". ABC News.
- Goldsworthy, Anna (September 2014). "In Port Augusta, an Israeli linguist is helping the Barngarla people reclaim their language". The Monthly.
- Green, W. M. (1886). "Eastern Shore of Lake Torrens". In Curr, Edward Micklethwaite (ed.). The Australian race: its origin, languages, customs, place of landing in Australia and the routes by which it spread itself over the continent (PDF). Vol. 2. Melbourne: J. Ferres. pp. 126–127 – via Internet Archive.
- Howitt, Alfred William (1904). The native tribes of south-east Australia (PDF). Macmillan.
- Le Souef, A. A. C; Holden, R.W. (1886). "Port Lincoln" (PDF). In Curr, Edward Micklethwaite (ed.). The Australian race: its origin, languages, customs, place of landing in Australia and the routes by which it spread itself over the continent. Vol. 2. Melbourne: J. Ferres. pp. 8–9 – via Internet Archive.
- Mansfield, John (2015). "Croft on behalf of the Barngarla Native Title Claim Group v State of South Australia". Federal Court of Australia.
- "map of Indigenous Australia". AIATSIS. 10 January 2021.
- Mathews, R. H. (January 1900). "Divisions of the South Australian Aborigines". Proceedings of the American Philosophical Society. 39 (161): 78–91+93. JSTOR 983545.
- "Our Story". Nepabunna.
- Prichard, James Cowles (1847). Researches into the physical history of mankind (PDF). Vol. 5 (3rd ed.). Sherwood, Gilbert & Piper – via Internet Archive.
- Roberts, Georgia; Gooch, Declan (24 September 2021). "Barngarla people granted native title over Port Augusta after 25-year fight". ABC News.
- Schürmann, Clamor Wilhelm (1879). "The Aboriginal Tribes of Port Lincoln" (PDF). In Woods, James Dominick (ed.). The Native Tribes of South Australia. Adelaide: E.S. Wigg & Son. pp. 207–252 – via Internet Archive.
- Strehlow, C. (1910). Leonhardi, Moritz von (ed.). Die Aranda- und Loritja-Stämme in Zentral-Australien Part 3 (PDF). Joseph Baer & Co.
- Tindale, Norman Barnett (1974). "Pangkala(SA)". Aboriginal Tribes of Australia: Their Terrain, Environmental Controls, Distribution, Limits, and Proper Names. Australian National University Press. ISBN 978-0-708-10741-6. Archived from the original on 14 March 2018.
- Zuckermann, Ghil'ad; Walsh, Michael (2014). Heinrich, Patrick; Ostler, Nicholas (eds.). "Our Ancestors Are Happy!": Revivalistics in the Service of Indigenous Wellbeing. FEL XVIII Ockinawa: Indigenous Languages: their Value to the Community. Foundation for Endangered Languages and Ryukyuan Heritage Language Society. pp. 113–119 – via professorzuckermann.com.
