= Emil Ermatinger =

Swiss professor for Germanic philology

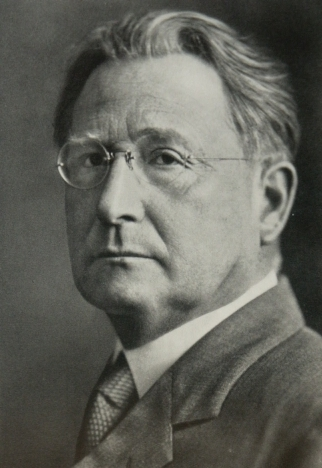
- Emil Ermatinger
- Born: May 21, 1873; Schaffhausen, Switzerland
- Died: September 17, 1953; Zurich, Switzerland
- Education: University of Zurich, University of Berlin
- Alma mater: University of Zurich
- Occupation: Professor of Germanic philology
- Employer(s): ETH Zurich, University of Zurich, Columbia University
- Notable work: Die deutsche Lyrik, Das dichterische Kunstwerk, Deutsche Dichter 1700–1900

Emil Ermatinger (21 May 1873 in Schaffhausen, Switzerland – 17 September 1953 in Zurich) was a Swiss professor for Germanic philology.

Ermatinger studied classical philology in Zurich and Berlin. 1897 he wrote his Ph.D. thesis at the University of Zurich. His doctoral advisor was the classical archaeologist and philologist Hugo Blümner. 1909 Ermatinger became a professor for Germanic philology at ETH Zurich. 1912 till 1943 he was professor at the University of Zurich. 1939 he was visiting professor at the Columbia University in New York City.

== Works ==
- Gottfried Kellers Leben, Briefe und Tagebücher. Aufgrund der Biographie Jakob Baechtolds dargestellt, 3 vol., 1915–18.
- Die deutsche Lyrik in ihrer geschichtlichen Entwicklung von Herder bis zur Gegenwart, 2 vol., 1921.
- Das dichterische Kunstwerk. Grundbegriffe der Urteilsbildung in der Literaturgeschichte, 1921.
- Weltdeutung in Grimmelshausens Simplicius Simplizissimus, 1925.
- Barock und Rokoko in der deutschen Dichtung, 1926.
- Dichtung und Geistesleben der deutschen Schweiz, 1933.
- Deutsche Kultur im Zeitalter der Aufklärung, 1935.
- Richte des Lebens und Jahre des Wirkens. Autobiography in two volumes, 1943/45.
- Deutsche Dichter 1700–1900. Eine Geistesgeschichte in Lebensbildern, 2 vol., 1948/49.
