= Barngarla language =

Revived Aboriginal language of South Australia

Barngarla
- Parnkalla
- Native to: Australia
- Region: South Australia
- Ethnicity: Barngarla
- Extinct: 1964, with the death of Moonie Davis
- Revival: from 2012
- Language family: Pama–Nyungan: Thura-Yura; Yura; Barngarla

Language codes
- ISO 639-3: bjb
- Glottolog: bang1339
- AIATSIS: L6
- ELP: Barngarla
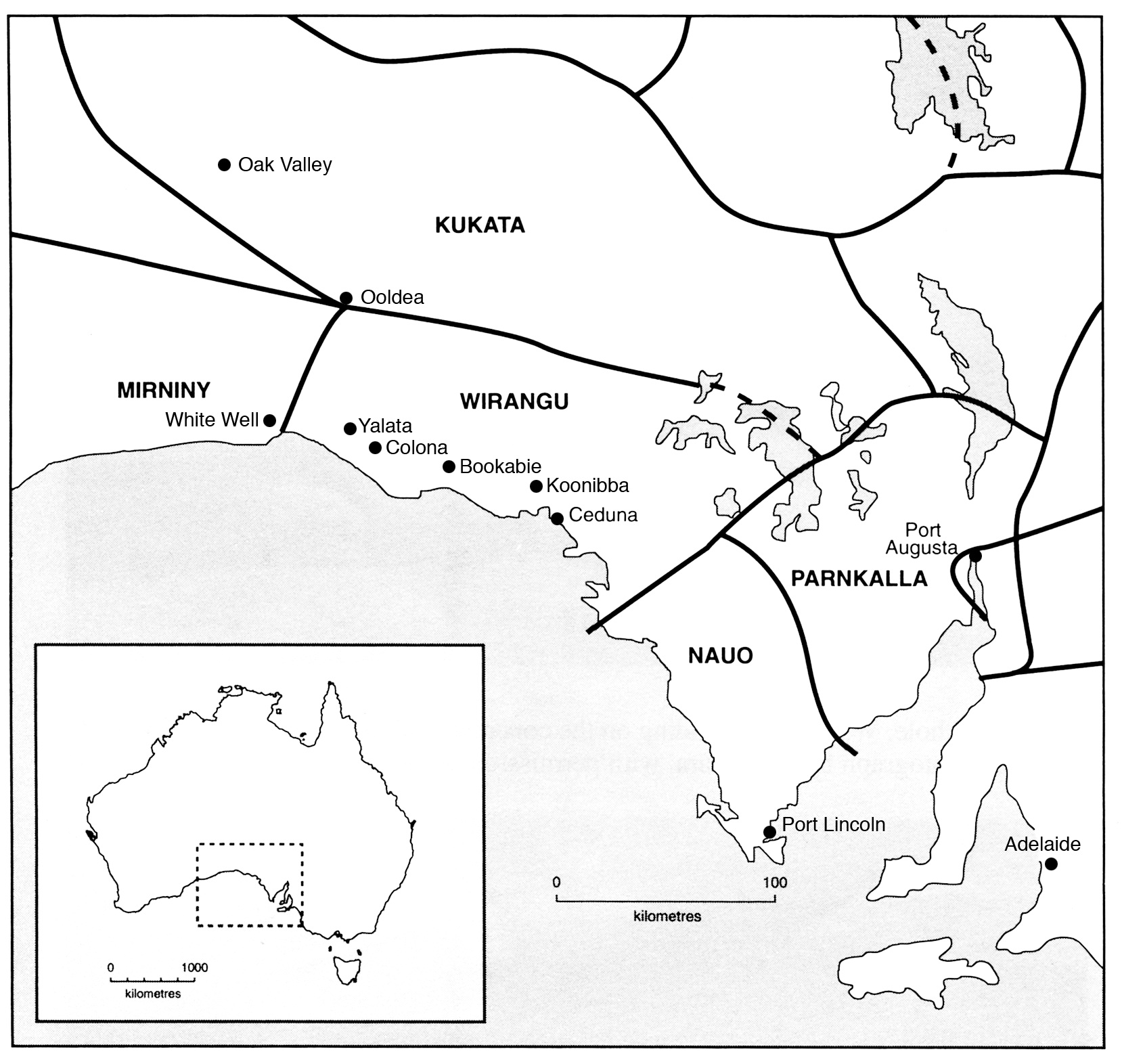
- Aboriginal languages of South Australia

Barngarla, formerly known as Parnkalla, is an Aboriginal language of Eyre Peninsula, South Australia. It was formerly extinct, but has undergone a process of revival since 2012.

== Language revival ==
The last native speaker of the language died in 1964. However, the language has been revived thanks to the work of a German Lutheran pastor Clamor Wilhelm Schürmann, who worked at a mission in 1844 and recorded 3,500 (or 2000?) words to form a Barngarla dictionary, entitled A Vocabulary of the Parnkalla [Barngarla] Language, Spoken by the Natives Inhabiting the Western Shores of Spencer's Gulf.

In 2012 the chair of linguistics and endangered languages at the University of Adelaide, Ghil'ad Zuckermann, started working with the Barngarla community to revive and reclaim the Barngarla language, based on Schürmann's work. Language revival workshops are held in Port Augusta, Whyalla, and Port Lincoln several times each year, with funding from the federal government's Indigenous Languages Support program.

In 2015, linguist Mark Clendon produced a detailed analysis of Schürmann's 1844 grammar of Barngarla (later revised in 2018). This work would expand greatly on Schürmann's documentation by contrasting his work with other Barngarla documentation (such as that of Luise Hercus and Harry Crawford) as well as using comparative linguistics to fill in grammatical gaps within the language thanks to the documentation of other Thura-Yura languages. Notably, this work conflicts both in grammar and orthography with the "revived" form of Barngarla developed by Zuckermann in conjunction with the modern Barngarla community.

In October 2016, a mobile app featuring a dictionary of over 3,000 Barngarla words was publicly released.

Wardlada Mardinidhi / Barngarla Bush Medicines, a 24-page book, was published in July 2023. It is the third book co-written by Zuckermann and members of the Richards family of Port Lincoln, this time represented by Evelyn Walker. It records the names a number of native plants from around Port Lincoln in Barngarla, Latin, and English, and describes their use as bush medicine. Walker hopes that the book will form part of a program to help youth and others affected by the Stolen Generations to reconnect with their culture and language, improving their mental health.

== Phonology ==
=== Consonants ===
Barngarla has the following consonant phonemes:

		Peripheral		Laminal		Coronal	
		Labial	Velar	Dental	Palatal	Alveolar	Retroflex
Plosive		b	ɡ	d̪	ɟ	d	ɖ
Nasal		m ~ ^{b}m	ŋ	n̪ ~ ^{d̪}n̪	ɲ ~ ^{ɟ}ɲ	n ~ ^{d}n	ɳ ~ ^{ɖ}ɳ
Lateral				l̪ ~ ^{d̪}l̪	ʎ ~ ^{ɟ}ʎ	l ~ ^{d}l	ɭ ~ ^{ɖ}ɭ
Rhotic	trill					r	
Rhotic	tap					ɾ	
Approximant		w			j		ɻ

- All non-velar, nasal and lateral sounds can be prestopped when they occur at the start of a second syllable in a word.
- The plosive /ɟ/ is usually realised as an affricate [ɟʝ] or as a plosive with approximant release [ɟj] when followed by a vowel.

=== Vowels ===
Barngarla has the following vowel phonemes:

	Front	Back
Close	i iː	u
Open	a aː	

=== Stress ===
The stress always falls on the first syllable of each word.

== Orthography ==
Barngarla is written phonetically using an alphabet of 27 letters, consisting of both single characters and digraphs from the English alphabet.

Letter	IPA	Pronunciation Guide
a	/a/	As in the English words "papa", "visa"
aa	/aː/	As in the English words "father"
ai	/ai/	As in the English words "pie", "sky"
aw	/aw/	As in the English words "power", "town"
b	/b/	A normal English "b"
d	/d/	A normal English "d"
dh	/d̪/	A "d" pronounced with the tongue between the teeth, as in between the sound of the English words "this" and "dust"
dy	/ɟ/	As in the English word "judge", except with the tongue against the roof of the mouth
g	/ɡ/	A normal English "g"
i	/i/	As in the English words "bit", "sit", "pit"
ii	/iː/	As in the English words "tea", "key", "ski"
l	/l/	A normal English "l"
lh	/l̪/	A normal English "l" but with the tongue between the teeth
ly	/ʎ/	As in the English words "million", "will-you", with the tongue against the roof of the mouth
m	/m/	A normal English "m"
n	/n/	A normal English "n"
ng	/ŋ/	As in the English words "ringing", "singing", "Long Island"
nh	/n̪/	As in the English word "tenth", with the tongue between the teeth
ny	/ɲ/	As in the English word "onion", with the tongue against the roof of the mouth
oo	/u/	As in the English words "put", "butcher"
r	/ɾ/	The tap/flap of Japanese "r", which is also heard in the Australian pronunciation of the "t" in "water".
rd	/ɖ/	A "d" pronounced with the tongue tip curled back behind the teeth
rh	/ɻ/	As in the English word "roaring"
rl	/ɭ/	An "l" pronounced with the tongue tip curled back behind the teeth
rn	/ɳ/	An "n" pronounced with the tongue tip curled back behind the teeth
rr	/r/	Alternatively, when spoken slowly or for emphasis, rr is pronounced as a rolled "r" trill as in Italian or Spanish.
w	/w/	A normal English "w"
y	/j/	A normal English "y"

Despite being considered letters of Barngarla, "ai" and "aw”, do not denote distinct phonemes. On the contrary, they are in fact nothing more than the sum of their parts. The sound of "ai" is literally just the sound of "a" followed by the sound of "i"; similarly with "aw".

when there is a sequence of two dental phonemes ("dh", "nh"), the "h" is only written once rather than twice. That is, the sequence /d̪n̪/ is written "dnh" and not "dhnh". Similarly with palatal phonemes ("dy", "ny", "ly") with the "y", ("dny" instead of "dyny"), and with retroflex phonemes ("rd", "rl", "rn") with the "r", ("rdn" instead of "rdrn").

== Grammar ==
=== Grammatical number ===
Barngarla has four grammatical numbers: singular, dual, plural and superplural. For example:

- wárraidya 'one emu (singular)'
- wárraidyalbili 'two emus (dual)'
- wárraidyarri 'several emus (plural)'
- wárraidyailyarranha 'a lot of emus, heaps of emus (superplural)'

=== Matrilineal and patrilineal distinction ===
Barngarla is characterised by a matrilineal and patrilineal distinction. For example, the matrilineal ergative case first person dual pronoun ngadlaga ("we two") would be used by a mother and her child, or by a man and his sister's child, while the patrilineal form ngarrrinyi would be used by a father and his child, or by a woman with her brother's child.

== Naming children according to their birth order ==
In traditional Barngarla, birth order was so important that each child within the family was named according to the order in which they were born. Barngarla has nine male birth order names and nine female birth order names, as following:

Male: Biri (1st), Warri (2nd), Gooni (3rd), Mooni (4th), Mari (5th), Yari (6th), Mili (7th), Wanggooyoo (8th) and Ngalai (9th).
Female: Gardanya (1st), Wayooroo (2nd), Goonda (3rd), Moonaga (4th), Maroogoo (5th), Yaranda (6th), Milaga (7th), Wanggoordoo (8th) and Ngalaga (9th).

To determine the suitable name for the newborn Barngarla child, the parents first found out the number of the newborn within the family, and only then selected the male/female name, according to the gender of the newborn. So, for example, if a baby girl was born after three boys, her name would have been Moonaga (4th born, female) as she was the fourth child within the family.
