= Jürg Häusermann =

Swiss-German media scholar

- Born: 1951 (age 74–75); Winterthur
- Education: University of Zurich
- Scientific career
- Fields: Media studies
- Workplaces: University of Tübingen
- Doctoral advisor: Harald Burger

Jürg Häusermann (born 1951) is a Swiss-German media scholar and emeritus professor. He studied Germanic, Russian language and literature and French linguistics at the University of Zurich and the Moscow State Linguistic University. Häusermann received his doctorate in 1977 in Zurich. 1985 to 1989 he was visiting professor at the University of Trieste in Italy. From 1993 to 2017, Häusermann was professor of media analysis and production at the University of Tübingen. He was the director of the German seminar at Tübingen. From 2009 to 2012 Häusermann was part of the jury for the LBS Wegweiser-Preis.

== Works ==
- Journalistisches Texten. 3rd edition. Konstanz: UVK, 2011. ISBN 978-3-86764-000-8
- Radio. Tübingen: Niemeyer, 1998. ISBN 3-484-37106-4
