= Language Contact and Lexical Enrichment in Israeli Hebrew =

Book about Israeli Hebrew linguistics

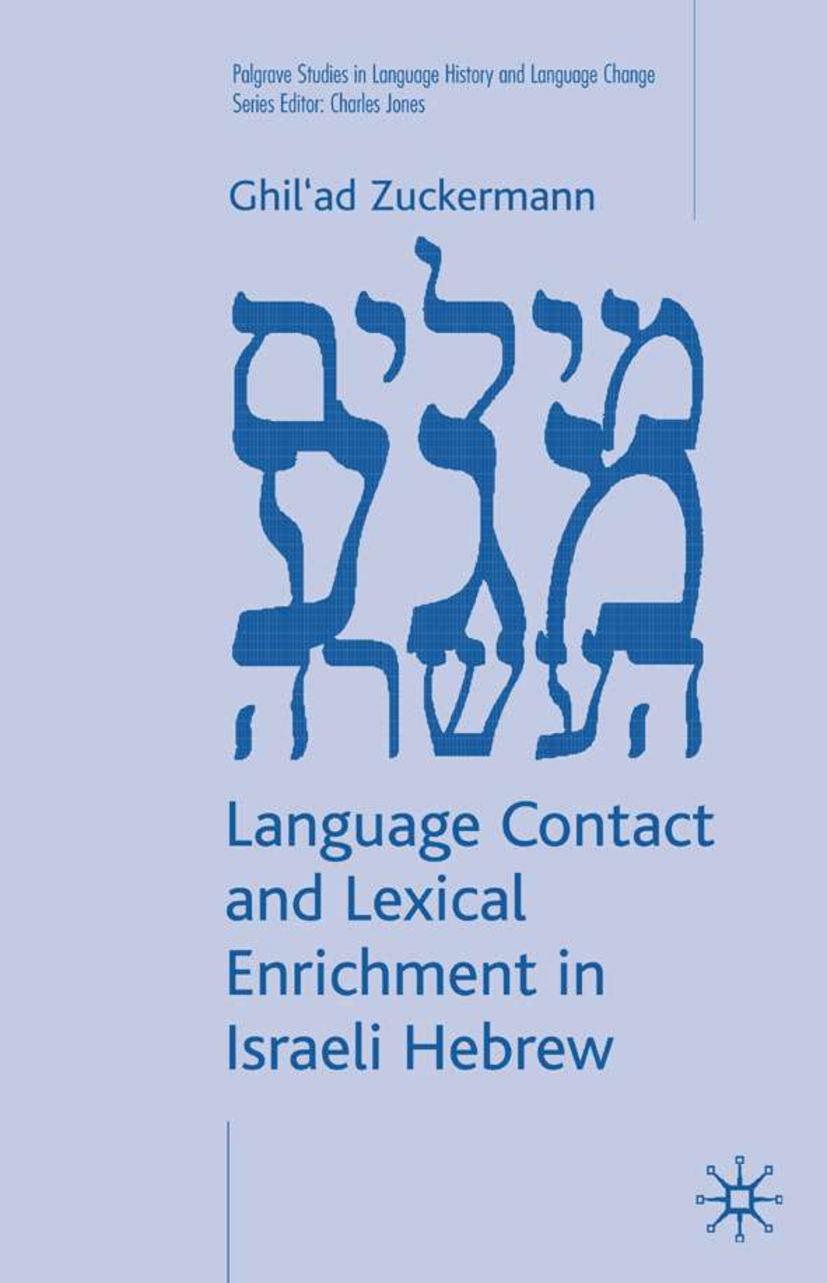
- Author: Ghil'ad Zuckermann
- Publisher: Palgrave Macmillan
- Publication date: 2003

Language Contact and Lexical Enrichment in Israeli Hebrew is a scholarly book written in the English language by linguist Ghil'ad Zuckermann, published in 2003 by Palgrave Macmillan. The book proposes a socio-philological framework for the analysis of "camouflaged borrowing" such as phono-semantic matching. It introduces for the first time a classification for "multisourced neologisms", new words that are based on two or more sources at the same time.

== Overview ==
The book was the first monograph published within the series Palgrave Studies in Language History and Language Change.

It provides new perspectives on etymology, word formation, language change, loanwords and contact linguistics. It establishes a principled classification of neologisms, their semantic fields, the roles of source languages, and the attitudes of purists and ordinary native speakers towards multi-factorial coinage. It analyses the tension between linguistic creativity and cultural flirting on the one hand, and the preservation of a distinct language identity on the other hand.

The analysis presented in this book challenges Einar Haugen's classic typology of lexical borrowing. Whereas Haugen categorizes borrowing into either substitution or importation, this book explores cases of "simultaneous substitution and importation" in the form of camouflaged borrowing. Examples of such mechanisms are phonetic matching, semanticized phonetic matching, phono-semantic matching and calquing.

The book examines words and phrases in Israeli (Modern Hebrew), Revolutionized Turkish, Mandarin Chinese, Japanese, Arabic, Yiddish, Estonian, Swahili, pidgins and creoles.

== Format ==
The book has two ISBNs: ISBN 978-1-4039-3869-5 and ISBN 1-4039-1723-X. It consists of 304 pages, including an index. The cover of the book features three Israeli Hebrew words:

- מילים milím means "words".
- מגע magá means "contact".
- העשרה ha'ashará means "enrichment".

== Reviews ==
The book was commended by Geoffrey Lewis (University of Oxford), James A. Matisoff (University of California, Berkeley), Jeffrey Heath (University of Michigan), and Shmuel Bolozky (University of Massachusetts).

According to Joseph T. Farquharson (Linguistlist):

The book is an outstanding piece of scholarship which undoubtedly represents a milestone in the field of lexicology. Zuckermann's attention to details has made the work a mini-encyclopaedia, much in the tradition of Jewish scholarship. Generally, his etymologies are well thought out and set a standard for current and future research [...] It would be foolhardy for any lexicographer, lexicologist, etymologist, language planner, morphologist not to have a copy of this book handy. The work is accessible to a general audience though. Zuckermann set himself an ambitious task which he has achieved with astounding brilliance.

=== Book reviews ===
- Fang, Xinxin (方欣欣) (2004). "Review of 'Language Contact and Lexical Enrichment in Israeli Hebrew'", Foreign Language Teaching and Research 36 (1), pp. 71–72.
- Farquharson, Joseph T. (2005). "Review of 'Language Contact and Lexical Enrichment in Israeli Hebrew'", Linguist List 16.1399: Book Review.
- Kaye, Alan S. (2004). "Review of 'Language Contact and Lexical Enrichment in Israeli Hebrew'", California Linguistics XXIX (1).
- Yadin, Azzan (2005). "Review of 'Language Contact and Lexical Enrichment in Israeli Hebrew'", Journal of Modern Jewish Studies 4 (2), pp. 243–245.
