= Language death =

Process in which a language loses all its native speakers

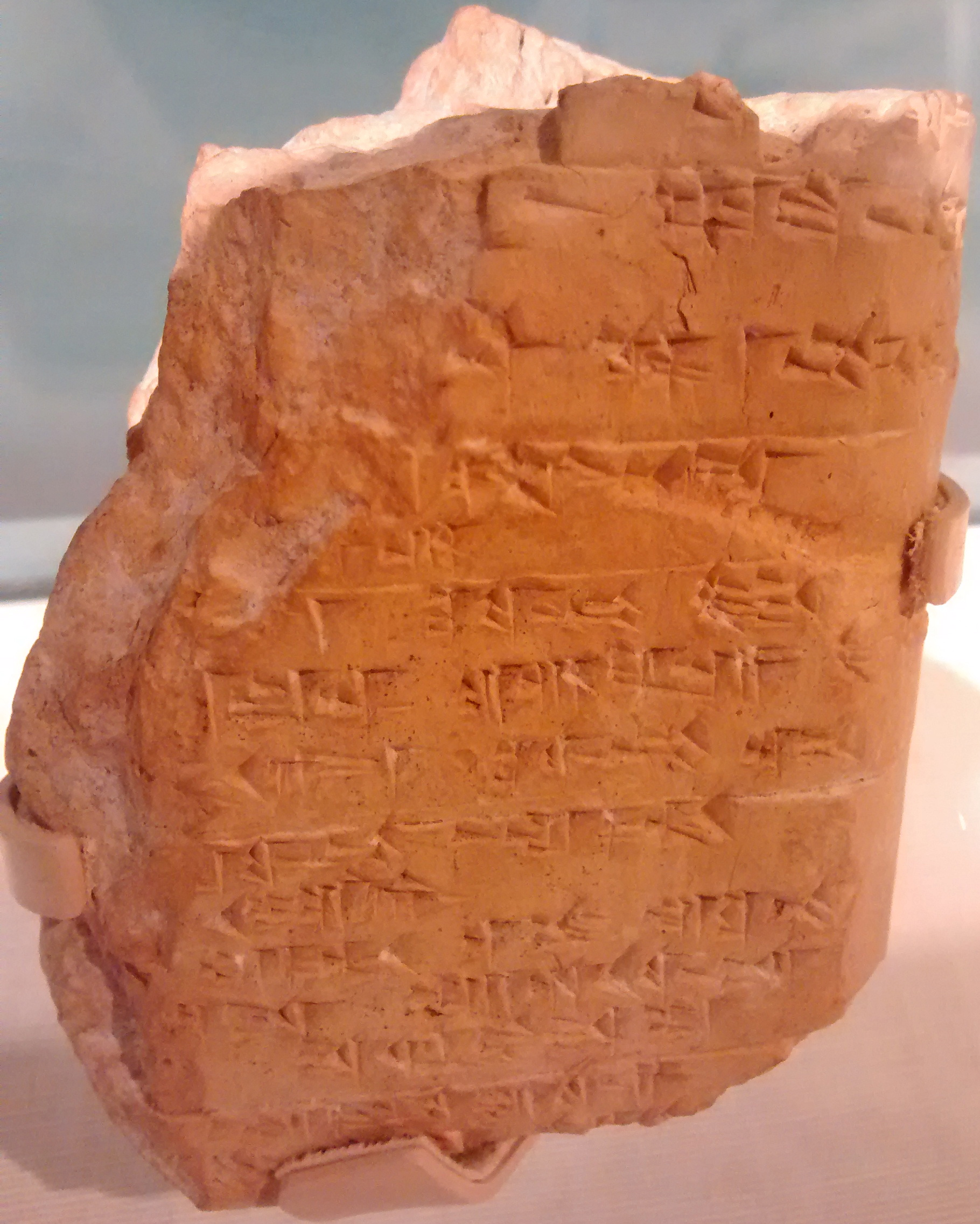
Hittite script on a clay tablet

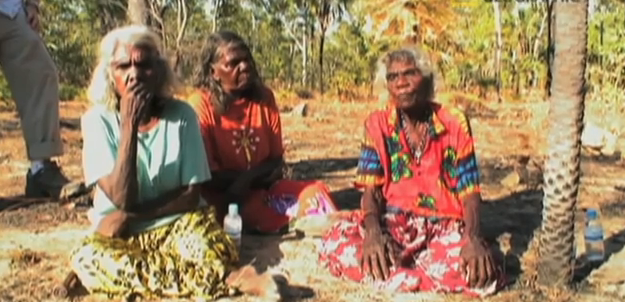
The last three native speakers of Magati Ke

In linguistics, language death occurs when a language loses its last native speaker. By extension, language extinction is when the language is no longer known, including by second-language speakers, when it becomes known as "dead" or "extinct". A related term is linguicide, the forced death of a language.

The disappearance of a minor language as a result of the absorption or replacement by a major language is sometimes called "glottophagy".

Language death is a process in which the level of a speech community's linguistic competence in their language variety decreases, eventually resulting in no native speakers of the variety. Language death can affect any language form, including dialects. Language death should not be confused with language attrition (also called language loss), which describes the loss of proficiency in a first language of an individual.

In the modern period (c. 1500 CE–present; following the rise of colonialism), language death has typically resulted from the process of cultural assimilation leading to language shift and the gradual abandonment of a native language in favour of a foreign lingua franca, largely those of European countries.

As of the 2000s, a total of roughly 7,000 natively spoken languages existed worldwide. Most of these are minor languages in danger of extinction; one estimate published in 2004 expected that some 90% of the currently spoken languages will have become extinct by 2050.

== Types ==
Language death is typically the outcome of language shift and may manifest itself in one of the following ways:

- Gradual language death: the most common way that languages die. Generally happens when the people speaking that language interact with speakers of a language of higher prestige. This group of people first becomes bilingual; then, with newer generations, the level of proficiency decreases, and finally no native speakers exist. This has sometimes been termed language murder.
- Bottom-to-top language death: occurs when the language starts to be used for only religious, literary, ceremonial purposes, but not in casual contexts. (As in Latin, (Note: Though do see Contemporary Latin as well.) Sanskrit (Note: Though do see Sanskrit revival as well.) or Avestan.)
- Top-to-bottom language death: happens when language shift begins in a high-level environment such as the government, but still continues to be used in casual contexts.
- Radical language death: the disappearance of a language when all speakers of the language cease to speak the language because of threats, pressure, persecution, or colonisation. In the case of radical death, language death is very sudden; therefore, the speech community skips over the semi-speaker phase where structural changes begin to happen to languages. The languages just disappear.
- Linguicide (also known as language genocide, physical language death, and biological language death): forced language death, often associated with the destruction of the identity of a certain group of people.
- Language attrition: the loss of proficiency in a language at the individual level.
- Change in the land of a speech community: This occurs when members of a speech community leave their traditional lands or communities and move to towns with different languages. For example, in a small isolated community in New Guinea, the young men of the community move to towns for better economic opportunities. The movement of people puts the native language in danger because more children become bilingual which makes the language harder to pass down to future generations.
- Cultural contact and clash: Cultural contact and clash affect how the community feels about the native language. Cultural, economic and political contact with communities that speak different languages are factors that may alter a community's attitude towards their own language.
- Language suicide: Outlined in opposition to language murder, linguistic structures are steadily loaned into a language from a similar one of higher prestige until the language becomes so similar that it is no longer distinct, as in decreolization.

The most common process leading to language death is one in which a community of speakers of one language becomes bilingual with another language, and gradually shifts allegiance to the second language until they cease to use their original heritage language. This is a process of assimilation which may be voluntary or may be forced upon a population. Speakers of some languages, particularly regional or minority languages, may decide to abandon them because of economic or utilitarian reasons, in favor of languages regarded as having greater utility or prestige.

Languages with a small, geographically isolated population of speakers can die when their speakers are wiped out by genocide, disease, or natural disaster.

== Definition ==
A language is often declared to be dead even before the last native speaker of the language has died. If there are only a few elderly speakers of a language remaining, and they no longer use that language for communication, then the language is effectively dead. A language that has reached such a reduced stage of use is generally considered moribund. An estimated half of the spoken languages of the world are not being taught to new generations of children. Once a language is no longer a native language—that is, if no children are being socialized into it as their primary language—the process of transmission is ended and the language itself will not survive past the current generations.

Language death is rarely a sudden event, but a slow process of each generation learning less and less of the language until its use is relegated to the domain of traditional use, such as in poetry and song. Typically the transmission of the language from adults to children becomes more and more restricted, to the final setting that adults speaking the language will raise children who never acquire fluency. One example of this process reaching its conclusion is that of the Dalmatian language.

== Statistics on language loss ==
The annual reference publication Ethnologue recorded 7,358 living languages known in 2001, but on 20 May 2015, it reported only 7,102 known living languages, and on 23 February 2016, only 7,097 known living languages. The United Nations (UN) estimates that a language is lost every two weeks.

== Consequences for grammar ==
During language loss, sometimes referred to as obsolescence in the linguistic literature, the language that is being lost generally undergoes changes as speakers make their language more similar to the language to which they are shifting. This process of change has been described by Appel (1983) in two categories, though they are not mutually exclusive. Often speakers replace elements of their own language with something from the language they are shifting toward. Also, if their heritage language has an element that the new language does not, speakers may drop it.

- overgeneralization;
- undergeneralization;
- loss of phonological contrasts;
- variability;
- changes in word order;
- morphological loss, such as was seen in Scottish Gaelic in East Sutherland, Scotland (Dorian: 1978) as fluent speakers still used the historic plural formation, whereas semi-speakers used simple suffixation or did not include any plural formation at all;
- synthetic morphosyntax may become increasingly analytic;
- syntactic loss (i.e. lexical categories, complex constructions);
- relexification;
- loss of word-formation productivity;
- style loss, such as the loss of ritual speech;
- morphological leveling;
- analogical leveling.

== Consequences for Indigenous communities ==
Within Indigenous communities, the death of language has consequences for individuals and the communities as a whole. There have been links made between their health (both physically and mentally) and the death of their traditional language. Language is an important part of their identity and as such is linked to their well-being.

One study conducted on aboriginal youth suicide rates in Canada found that Indigenous communities in which a majority of members speak the traditional language exhibit low suicide rates while suicide rates were six times higher in groups where less than half of its members communicate in their ancestral language.

Another study was also conducted on aboriginal peoples in Alberta, Canada. There was a link found between their traditional language knowledge and the prevalence of diabetes. The greater their knowledge was of their traditional language, the lower the prevalence of diabetes was within their communities.

== Language revitalization ==
Language revitalization is an attempt to slow or reverse language death. Revitalization programs are ongoing in many languages, and have had varying degrees of success.

The revival of the Hebrew language in Israel is the only example of a language's acquiring new first language speakers after it became extinct in everyday use for an extended period, being used only as a liturgical language or as a lingua franca between Jews from different linguistic communities. Even in the case of Hebrew, there is a theory that argues that "the Hebrew revivalists who wished to speak pure Hebrew failed. The result is a fascinating and multifaceted Israeli language, which is not only multi-layered but also multi-sourced. The revival of a clinically dead language is unlikely without cross-fertilization from the revivalists' mother tongue(s)."

Other cases of language revitalization that have seen some degree of success are Welsh, Basque, Hawaiian, and Navajo.

Reasons for language revitalization vary: they can include physical danger affecting those whose language is dying, economic danger such as the exploitation of natural resources, political danger such as genocide, or cultural danger such as assimilation. During the past century, it is estimated that more than 2,000 languages have already become extinct. The UN estimates that more than half of the languages spoken today have fewer than 10,000 speakers and that a quarter have fewer than 1,000 speakers; and that, unless there are some efforts to maintain them, over the next hundred years most of these will become extinct. These figures are often cited as reasons why language revitalization is necessary to preserve linguistic diversity. Culture and identity are also frequently cited reasons for language revitalization, when a language is perceived as a unique "cultural treasure". A community often sees language as a unique part of their culture, connecting them with their ancestors or with the land, making up an essential part of their history and self-image.

According to Ghil'ad Zuckermann, "language reclamation will become increasingly relevant as people seek to recover their cultural autonomy, empower their spiritual and intellectual sovereignty, and improve wellbeing. There are various ethical, aesthetic, and utilitarian benefits of language revival—for example, historical justice, diversity, and employability, respectively."

== Factors that prevent language death ==
Google launched the Endangered Languages Project aimed at helping preserve languages that are at risk of extinction. Its goal is to compile up-to-date information about endangered languages and share the latest research about them.

Anthropologist Akira Yamamoto has identified nine factors that he believes will help prevent language death:

1. There must be a dominant culture that favors linguistic diversity
2. The endangered community must possess an ethnic identity that is strong enough to encourage language preservation
3. The creation and promotion of programs that educate students on the endangered language and culture
4. The creation of school programs that are both bilingual and bicultural
5. For native speakers to receive teacher training
6. The endangered speech community must be completely involved
7. There must be language materials created that are easy to use
8. The language must have written materials that encompass new and traditional content
9. The language must be used in new environments and the areas the language is used (both old and new) must be strengthened.

== Dead languages ==
Linguists distinguish between language "death" and the process where a language becomes a "dead language" through normal language change, a linguistic phenomenon analogous to pseudoextinction. This happens when a language in the course of its normal development gradually morphs into something that is then recognized as a separate, different language, leaving the old form with no native speakers. Thus, for example, Old English may be regarded as a "dead language" although it changed and developed into Middle English, Early Modern English and Modern English. Dialects of a language can also die, contributing to the overall language death. For example, the Ainu language is slowly dying: "The UNESCO Atlas of the World's Languages in Danger lists Hokkaido Ainu as critically endangered with 15 speakers ... and both Sakhalin and Kuril Ainu as extinct." The language vitality for Ainu has weakened because of Japanese becoming the favoured language for education since the end of the nineteenth century. Education in Japanese heavily impacted the decline in use of the Ainu language because of forced linguistic assimilation.

== Language change ==
The process of language change may also involve the splitting up of a language into a family of several daughter languages, leaving the common parent language "dead". This happened to Latin, which (through Vulgar Latin) eventually developed into the Romance languages; to Classical Arabic, which (through various superstratum and substratum languages, as well as natural evolution) eventually developed into vernacular versions/dialects/varieties of Arabic, as well as languages like Maltese and Nubi; and to Sanskrit, which (through Prakrits (including Pali) and Dardic languages) developed (further through Apabhraṃśas and Apabhraṣṭas) into the New Indo-Aryan languages. Such a process is normally not described as "language death", because it involves an unbroken chain of normal transmission of the language from one generation to the next, with only minute changes at every single point in the chain. Thus, concerning Latin, for example, there is no point at which Latin "died"; it evolved in different ways in different geographic areas, and its modern forms are now identified by a plethora of different names such as French, Portuguese, Spanish, Italian, etc. Language shift can be used to understand the evolution of Latin into the various modern forms. Language shift, which could lead to language death, occurs because of a shift in language behaviour within a speech community. Contact with other languages and cultures causes a change in behaviour in the original language, which creates language shift.

== Measuring language vitality ==
Except in case of linguicide, languages do not suddenly become extinct; they become moribund as the community of speakers gradually shifts to using other languages. As speakers shift, there are discernible, if subtle, changes in language behavior. These changes in behavior lead to a change of linguistic vitality in the community. There are a variety of systems that have been proposed for measuring the vitality of a language in a community. One of the earliest is the GIDS (Graded Intergenerational Disruption Scale) proposed by Joshua Fishman in 1991. A noteworthy publishing milestone in measuring language vitality is an entire issue of Journal of Multilingual and Multicultural Development devoted to the study of ethnolinguistic vitality, Vol. 32.2, 2011, with several authors presenting their own tools for measuring language vitality. A number of other published works on measuring language vitality have been published, prepared by authors with varying situations and applications in mind. These include works by Arienne Dwyer, Martin Ehala, M. Lynne Landweer, Mark Karan, András Kornai, and Paul Lewis and Gary Simons.

== See also ==
- Classical language
- Cultural genocide
- Cultural hegemony
- Directorate of Language Planning and Implementation
- Endangered language
  - Lists of endangered languages
- Ethnocide
- Extinct language
  - Lists of extinct languages
- International auxiliary language
- Language contact
- Language movement
- Language policy
- Language revitalization
- Language shift
- Lingua Libre
- Linguistic discrimination
- Linguistic imperialism
- Linguistic purism
- Linguistic rights
- List of last known speakers of languages
- Minority language
- Native Tongue Title
- Prestige language
- Regional language
- Rosetta Project
- The Linguists (documentary film)
