= Yardliyawara =

Aboriginal Australian people of South Australia

The Yardliyawara, also known as the Jadliaura and variant spellings, are an Aboriginal Australian people of the northern Flinders Ranges region of South Australia. Today they are considered one of the larger grouping known as the Adnyamathanha people.

== Language ==
The Yardliyawara language is classified as one of the Karnic languages, though this has been disputed, and is now classified as a dialect of Yarli.

== Country ==
Norman Tindale describes their tribal lands as extending over some 7,400 square miles (19,000 km^{2}), from east of the northern sector of the Flinders Ranges, from Wertaloona south to Carrieton and Cradock. In an easterly direction the boundaries ran to Frome Downs and Holowilena Station on Siccus River. To the west the boundaries extended to Arkaba and Hawker.

== People ==
The Yardliyawara are often subsumed under a collective tribal grouping as one of the Adnyamathanha, which embraces also several other distinct groups such as the Wailpi, Kuyani, Pilatapa, and Barngarla. Their territory around Wertaloona had a variety of sandstone that could be used to manufacture millstones, and northern tribes would come down to trade for it.

== Cultural practices ==
The Yardliyawara imposed circumcision on young males undergoing initiation, but refused to adopt the rite of subincision practised by some of their neighbours.

== Alternative names ==
- Jadliaura
- Yadliaura
- Yadlikowera, Yaldikowera (error of transposition of d and l)
- Arkaba-tura (This ethnonym combines the toponym Arkaba with the word for 'man', tura.)
- Wonoka (toponym)
- Eura (this is a generic ethnonym covering several tribes)

== Some words ==
- wilka (tame dog)

== Sources ==
- Austin, Peter; Hercus, Luise (2004). "The Yarli Languages". In Bowern, Claire; Koch, Harold (eds.). Australian Languages: Classification and the comparative method. John Benjamins Publishing Company. pp. 207–222. ISBN 978-9-027-29511-8.
- Green, W. M. (1886). "Wonoka". In Curr, Edward Micklethwaite (ed.). The Australian race: its origin, languages, customs, place of landing in Australia and the routes by which it spread itself over the continent (PDF). Vol. 2. Melbourne: J. Ferres. pp. 124–125.
- Rawlings-Way, Charles; Worby, Meg; Brown, Lindsay; Harding, Paul (2009). Central Australia. Lonely Planet. ISBN 978-1-741-04663-2.
- Round, Erich (2014). "Prestopping of nasals and laterals is only partly parallel". In Pensalfini, Rob; Turpin, Myfany; Guillemin, Diana (eds.). Language Description Informed by Theory. John Benjamins Publishing Company. pp. 81–98. ISBN 978-9-027-27091-7.
- Tindale, Norman Barnett (1974). "Jadliaura (SA)". Aboriginal Tribes of Australia: Their Terrain, Environmental Controls, Distribution, Limits, and Proper Names. Australian National University Press. ISBN 978-0-708-10741-6.
