= Wailpi =

Aboriginal Australian people

The Wailpi are an indigenous people of South Australia They are also known as the Adnyamathanha, which also refers to a larger group, though they speak a dialect of the Adnyamathanha language.

== Country ==
The Wailpi had, according to Norman Tindale's figures, about 3,000 square miles (7,800 km^{2}) of territory around Umberatana and Mount Serie, south as far as Parachilna Gorge only in the Flinders Ranges. Their eastern extension ran above Wooltana. An early report by a police trooper in the area, Henry Quincy Smith, placed these "hill people" at Mount Freeiing, Umberatana, Angipena, Ameandana. Lollabollana, Illawortina, the Daly and Stanley Mine (Poondinna).

== Social organisation and customs ==
The Wailpi practised both circumcision and subincision.

== Mythology ==
According to Henry Quincy Smith:

They believe that two old women called Yammutu live towards the east a long way (paldrupa), and that when rain comes they lie down on their backs with their legs open, and the water runs into their person and causes them to bear a lot of young blacks called Muree; who, as they grow up, start westward, always throwing a small waddy, called weetchu, before them, till one of them meets a blackfellow with his lubra. The Muree, being invisible, then walks in the blackfellow' s tracks to make him or her look like the blackfellow, and then throws the small waddy under the thumb-nail or great toe-nail, and so enters into the woman's body. She is soon pregnant, and in due time gives birth to an ordinary child.'

== Alternative names ==
- Anjamutina, Andyamatana
- Anjimatana (Kuyani exonym = 'hill people')
- Anyamatana, Adnjamatana, Adnjamadana, Adjnjamatana, Adyamatana
- Archualda
- Atjualda (mishearing of preceding)
- Benbakanjamata (Kuyani exonym meaning 'Pine Hills people')
- Binbarnja (Wadikali exonym from binba = Callitris)
- Gadjnjamadja
- Kanjamata, Kanjimata (Wongkanguru exonym)
- Keidnamutha
- Keydnjamarda
- Kudnamietha (eastern tribal exonym, kudna = feces, i.e. shit-eaters)
- Kutchnamootha
- Mardala (Diyari exonym from Wailpi ma:dəla, meaning 'no')
- Mardula
- Ngatjuwalda ('our speech', language name)
- Nimalda
- Nimbalda, Nimbaldi (misprint)
- Nuralda
- Umbertana (error for Umberatana, a toponym)
- Unyamatana, Unyamootha
- Wadla ('Scrub wallabies', Diyari pejorative exonym)
- Wailbi (in Barngarla, this word means 'south west')
- Wajalpi
- Wipie

== Sources ==
- "Aboriginal South Australia". Government of South Australia. Archived from the original on 1 May 2013.
- "AIATSIS map of Indigenous Australia". AIATSIS.
- Mountford, C. P.; Harvey, Alison (December 1941). "Women of the Adnjamatana Tribe of the Northern Flinders Ranges, South Australia". Oceania. 12 (2): 155–162. doi:10.1002/j.1834-4461.1941.tb00352.x. JSTOR 40327941.
- Schebeck, B. (1973). "The Atynymatana personal pronoun and the Wailpi kinship system". Papers in Australian Linguistics (6).
- Smith, Henry Quincy; Taplin, George (1879). Folklore, manners, customs and languages of the South Australian aborigines (PDF). Adelaide: E Spiller, Acting Government Printer. pp. 87–89.
- Tindale, Norman Barnett (1974). "Wailpi (SA)". Aboriginal Tribes of Australia: Their Terrain, Environmental Controls, Distribution, Limits, and Proper Names. Australian National University Press. ISBN 978-0-708-10741-6.
