= Faith Thomas =

Australian cricketer and nurse (1933–2023)

Faith Thomas AM
Personal information
- Born: Tinnipha; 22 February 1933; Nepabunna, South Australia
- Died: 15 April 2023 (aged 90); Port Augusta, South Australia
- Batting: Right-handed
- Bowling: Right-arm fast
- Role: Bowler

International information
- National side: Australia
- Only Test (cap 48): 21 February 1958 v England

Domestic team information
- Years: Team
- 1956–1958: South Australia

Career statistics
Competition	WTest	WFC
Matches	1	7
Runs scored	3	106
Batting average	3.00	13.25
100s/50s	0/0	0/0
Top score	3	38
Balls bowled	36	148
Wickets	0	9
Bowling average	–	23.11
5 wickets in innings	–	0
10 wickets in match	–	0
Best bowling	–	4/79
Catches/stumpings	1/–	1/0
- Source: ESPNcricinfo, 17 April 2023

Faith Thomas AM (née Coulthard; 22 February 1933 – 15 April 2023), born Tinnipha, was an Australian cricketer. She was also a nurse in regional South Australia and a hockey player. Thomas is known for being the first Indigenous woman to represent Australia in any sport as well as for her distinguished service to the Australian Indigenous community.

== Early life ==
Thomas was born as Tinnipha at the Nepabunna Aboriginal Mission in South Australia. Her mother, Ivy, was an Adnyamathanha woman and her father was German. Her mother would take her to the Colebrook Home for Aboriginal Children in Quorn when she was a baby. She would play cricket with other children at Colebrook, using stones as balls, and making bats from wood they found.

== Nursing career ==
Thomas completed her nursing training at the Royal Adelaide Hospital, graduating in 1954. She was South Australia's first Indigenous nurse to be employed as a public servant. Thomas undertook midwifery training in Adelaide at Queen Victoria Hospital in Adelaide and in 1958 was employed to work at Raukkan (known then as Point McLeay Aboriginal Reserve). Thomas later went on to become a patrol nurse, spending much time living out of her car while on call.

== Cricket career ==
After being introduced to cricket by a colleague at Royal Adelaide Hospital, Thomas made an immediate impact for her club side, taking a hat-trick in her second game. She was selected to play for the South Australia Women's cricket team after only three club games. She played for her state side between 1956 and 1958.

In 1958, she was selected for the Australian national team. She played her only international match against England, at Melbourne in February 1958. She was the first Aboriginal woman to be selected to represent Australia in sport, and until 2019 (following the selection of Ashleigh Gardner) was the only Indigenous woman to play test cricket for Australia. Thomas was selected in the squad to tour England and New Zealand after her test debut, but turned down the opportunity to focus on her nursing career.

Thomas was known for her fast bowling off a run-up of just a few steps. She was renowned for her pace and skill of bowling the yorker. Thomas's skill as a fast bowler came from her time in Colebrook where she would throw rocks at galahs. Thomas played her final club cricket game in the early 1960s. She was eight months pregnant at the time.

The WBBL plays an annual Faith Thomas match between the Adelaide Strikers and the Perth Scorchers to honour her achievements in both cricket and nursing. The winner of the match is presented with the Faith Thomas Trophy.

== Death ==
Thomas died on 15 April 2023 in Port Augusta, South Australia, at the age of 90.
