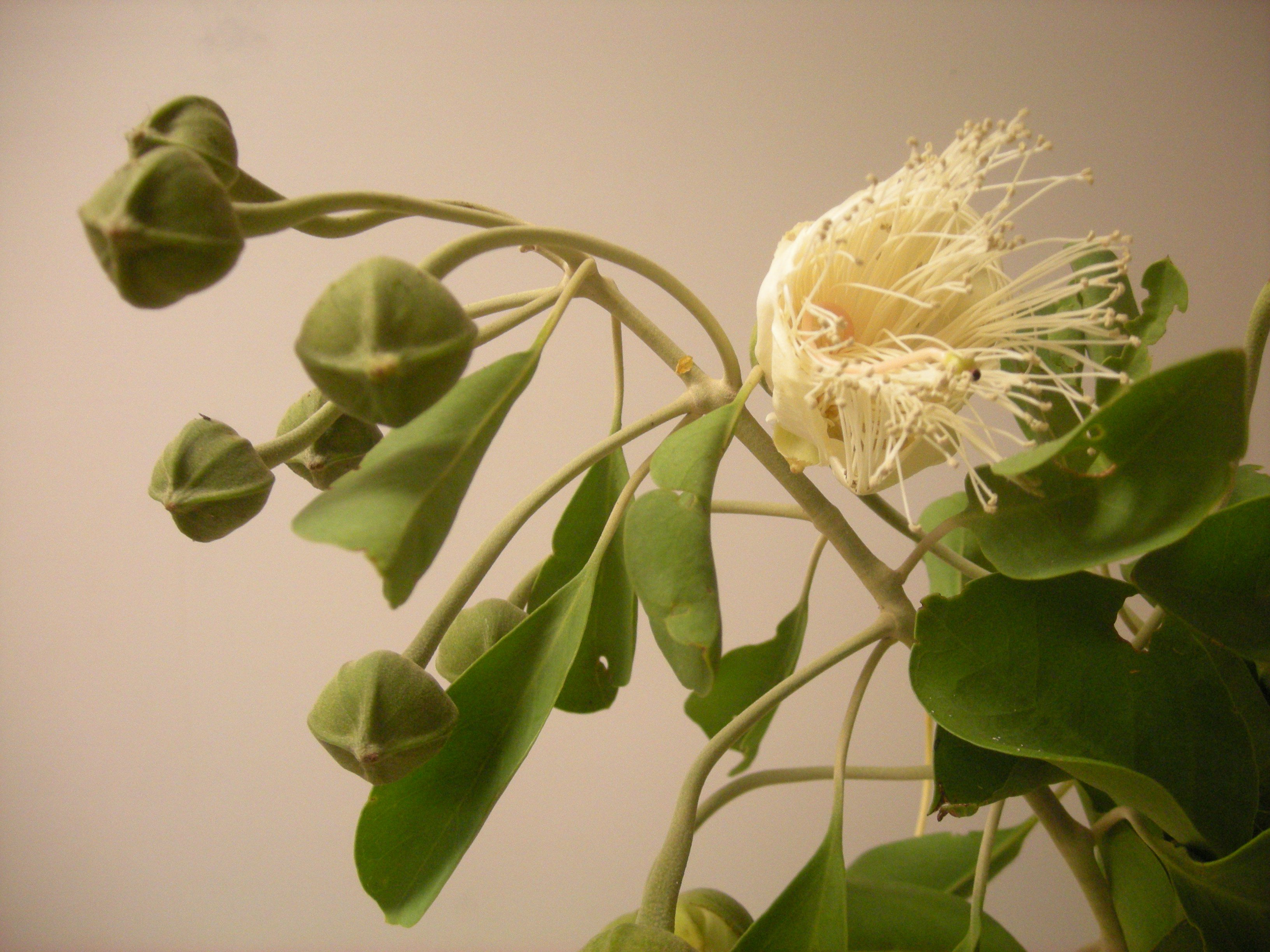

Scientific classification
- Kingdom: Plantae
- Clade: Embryophytes
- Clade: Tracheophytes
- Clade: Spermatophytes
- Clade: Angiosperms
- Clade: Eudicots
- Clade: Rosids
- Order: Brassicales
- Family: Capparaceae
- Genus: Capparis
- Species: C. mitchellii

Binomial name
- Capparis mitchellii Lindl.

Synonyms
- Busbeckea mitchellii F.Muell.

= Capparis mitchellii =

Species of fruit and plant

Capparis mitchellii, the wild orange, is an Australian native plant found in dry inland areas of Australia. It is not related to oranges, nor to the Osage-orange which is known as "wild orange" in North America, but to capers.

Used by Aboriginal Australians as bush tucker long before European settlement in Australia, the fruit is a good source of vitamin C and may be enjoyed raw or in sweet and savoury dishes.

== Names ==
Capparis mitchellii was classified and named after Scottish explorer Thomas Mitchell by 19th-century botanist John Lindley.

It is also known as the native orange, native pomegranate, and bumble tree. It is known in the Arrernte language of Central Australia as merne atwakeye, in the Adnyamathanha language of the Flinders Ranges in South Australia as iga or iga warta, and in the Gamilaraay language as bambul.

== Habit and habitat ==
Capparis mitchellii can grow up to eight metres in height, as a tall shrub or small tree, with leaves between two and six centimetres in length, dull green in colour and oval in shape. The bark is black and deeply grooved, and the plant is very thorny when young. The flowers, which only last for a day, are large and coloured white or cream, with long protruding stamens.

It grows in open savannah, in drier areas of Australia, being especially prevalent in inland eastern areas of New South Wales and Queensland and southern parts of the Northern Territory. It prefers sandy to clay loams but will grow on rocky hillsides and is tolerant of limestone.

Growing in the Flinders Ranges of South Australia, where it is used by the Adnyamathanha people, a cultural tourism enterprise is named after its local name, Iga Warta.

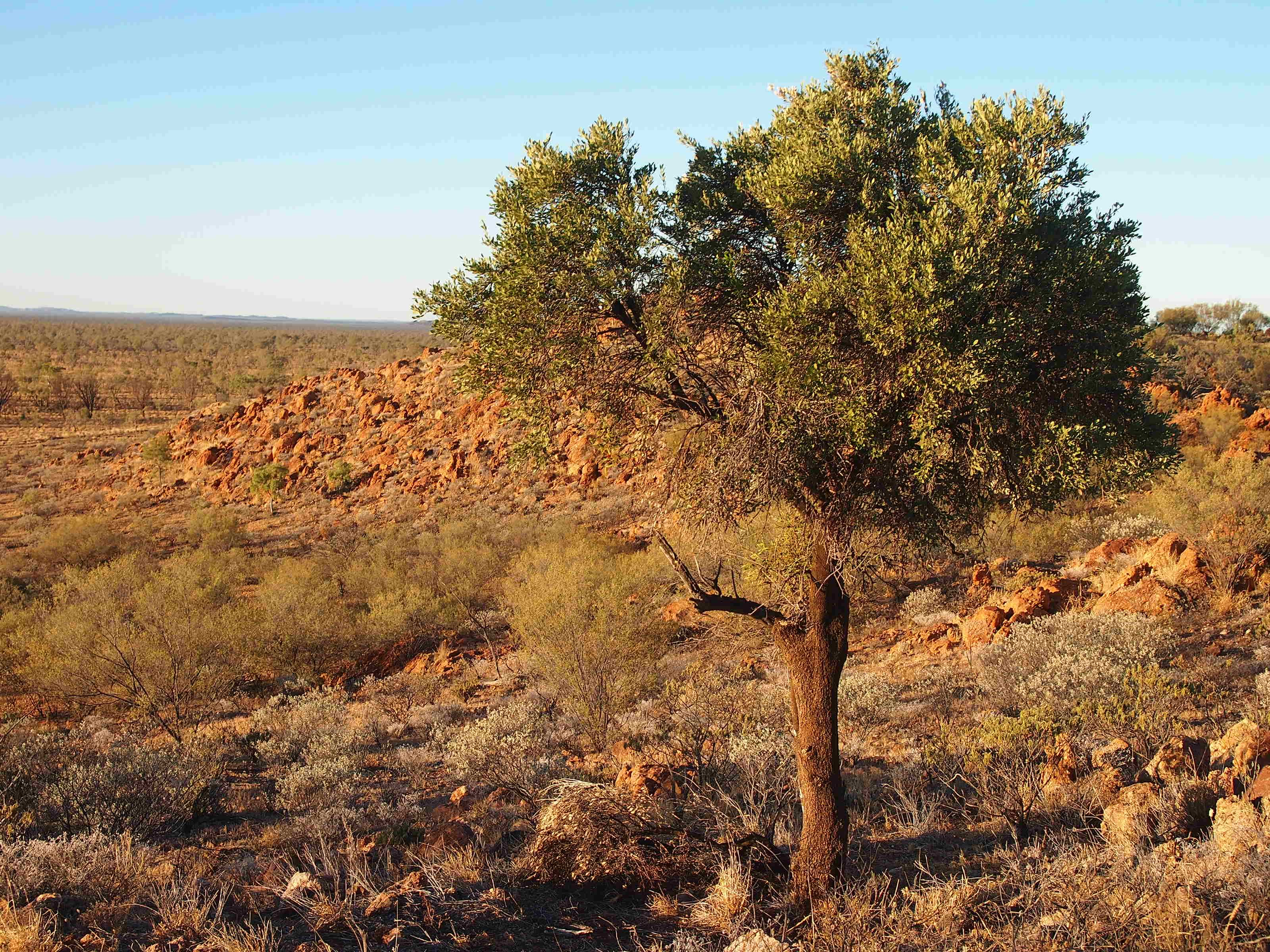

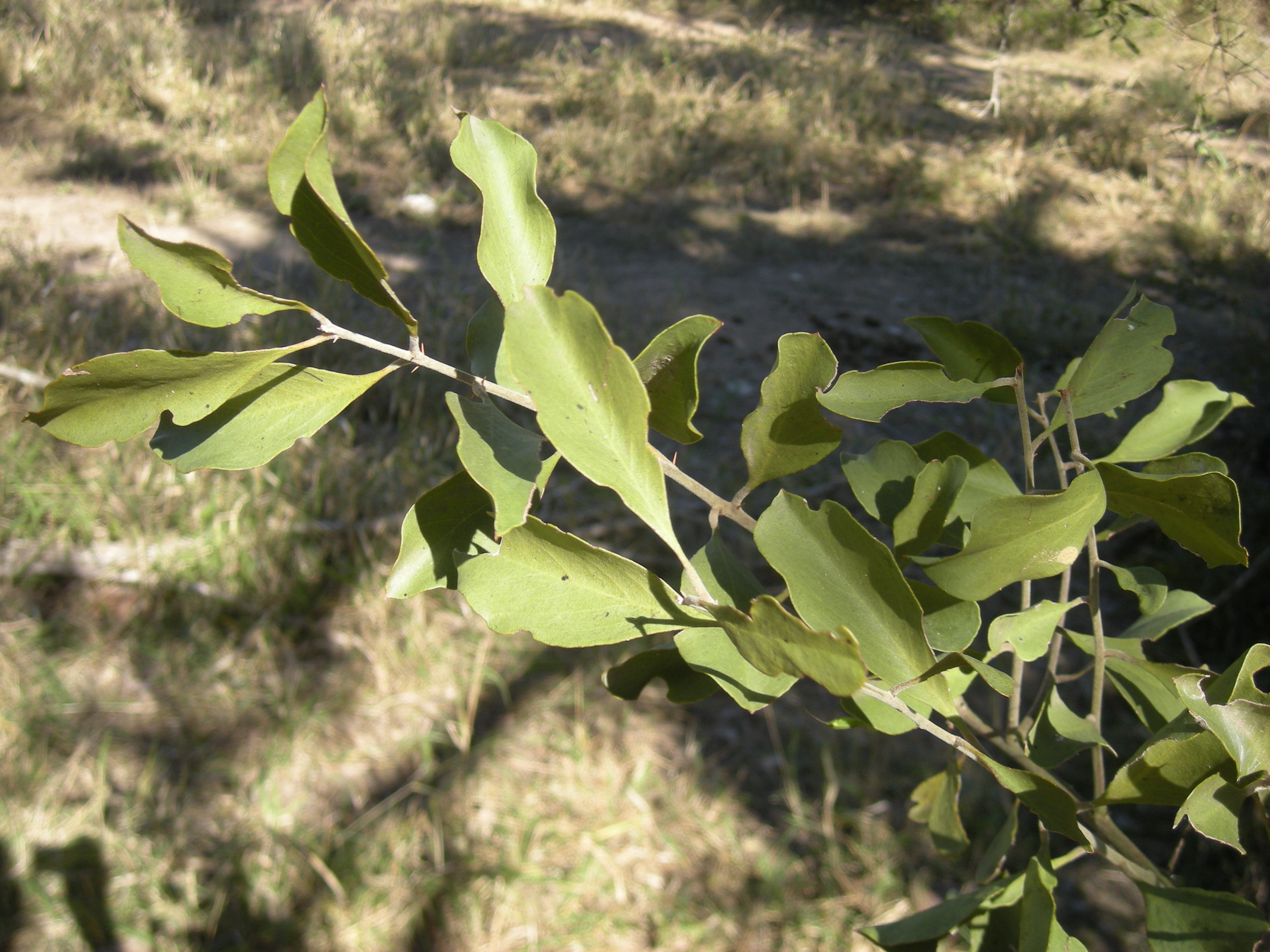

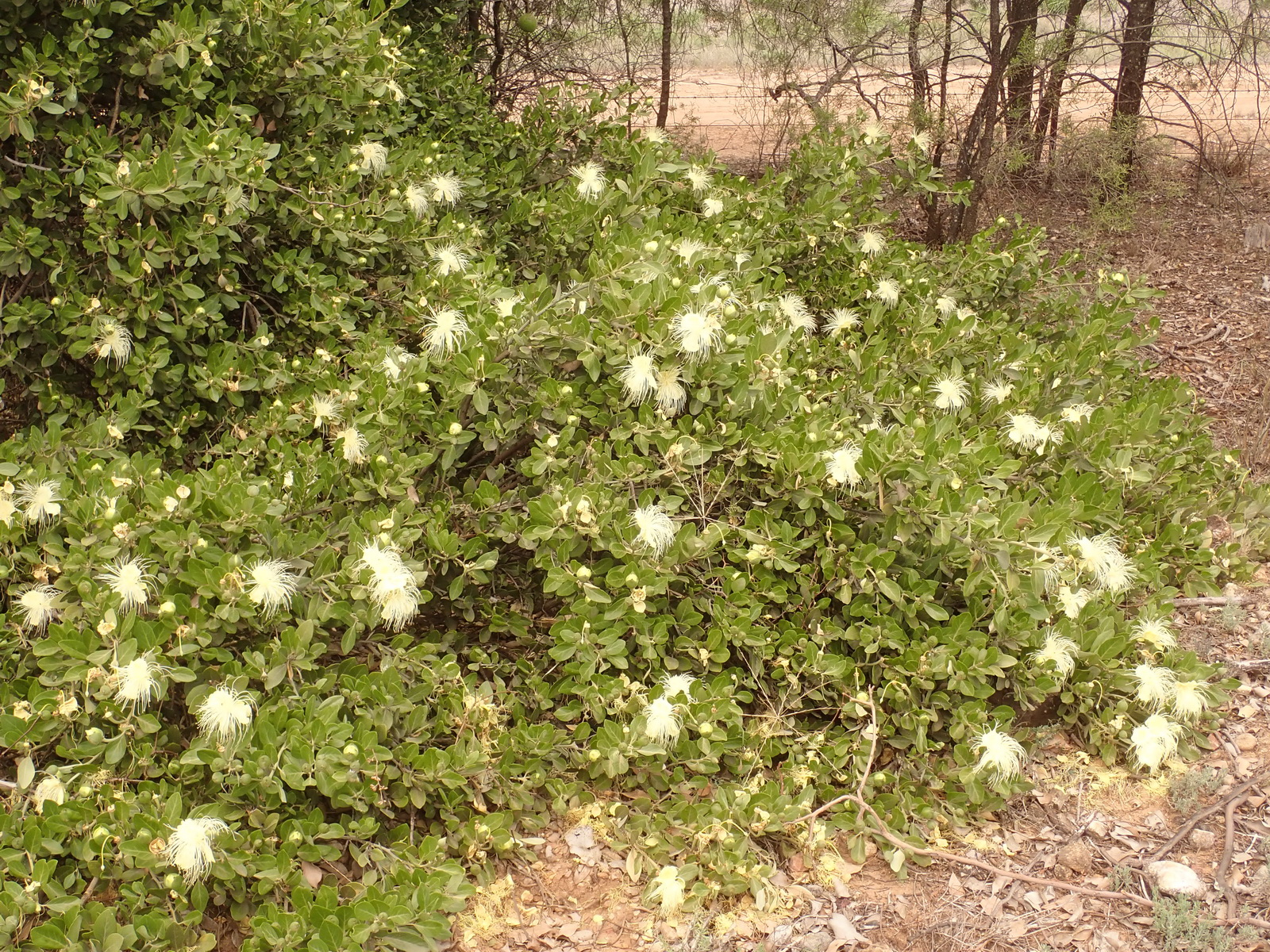

== Fruit ==
The Useful Native Plants of Australia (1889) records that the plant was also commonly referred to as "small native pomegranate", "native orange", and "mondo", and that "The fruit is from one to two inches in diameter, and the pulp, which has an agreeable perfume, is eaten by the natives. It was found in all the colonies, except Tasmania and Western Australia".

Wild oranges are a bush tucker food. Aboriginal Australians made frequent use of it long before European arrival. It is round and green when unripe, turning a shade of purple or orange and becoming soft and developing a sweet smell as it ripens in mid to late summer, reaching a size of 4–7 cm (1.6–2.8 in) in diameter.

The raw fruit is a good source of Vitamin C and has a tangy taste. The seeds and skin are inedible, but the fruit can be eaten raw, used to make desserts or cordial (squash), or added to main course dishes.

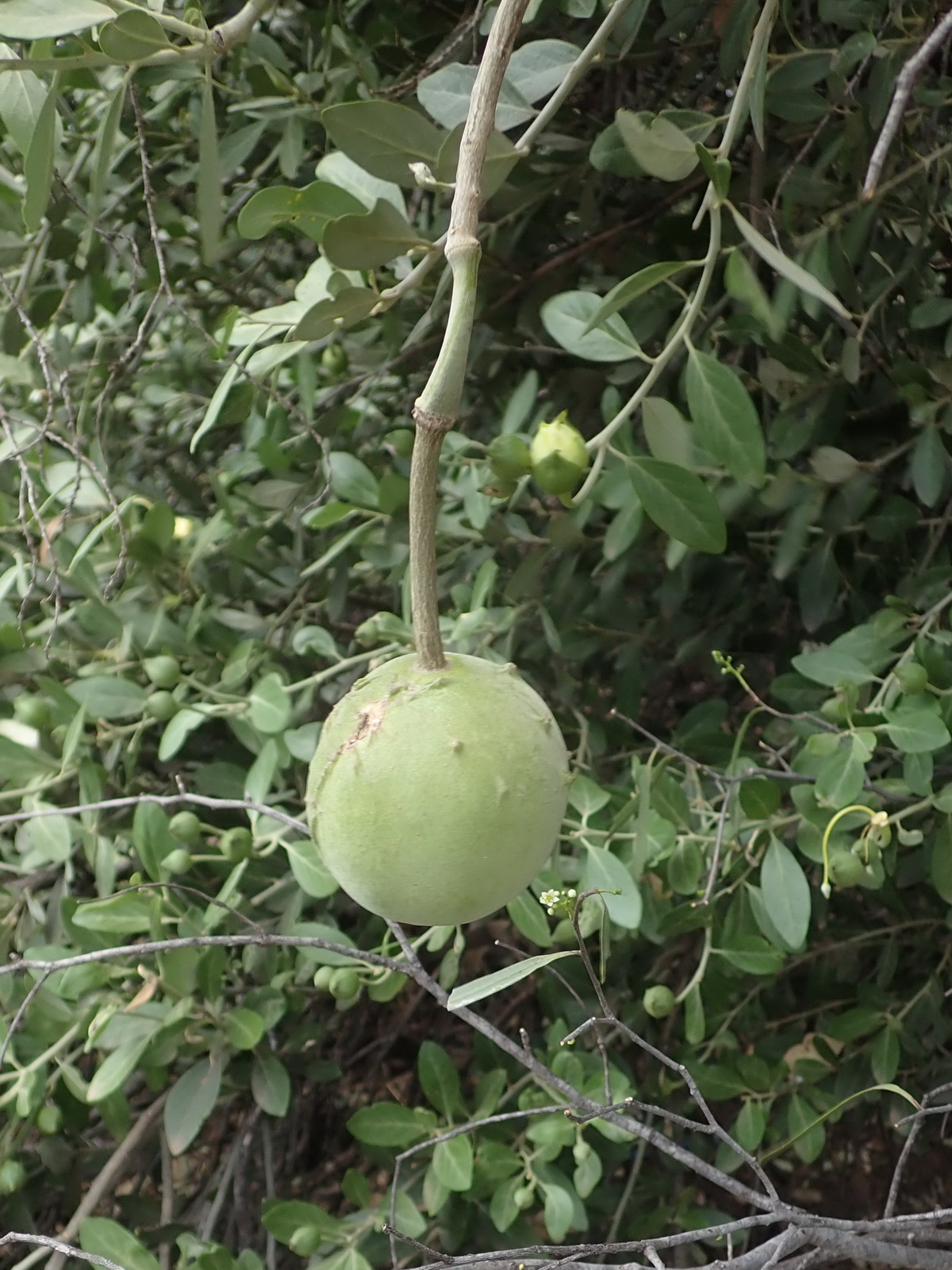

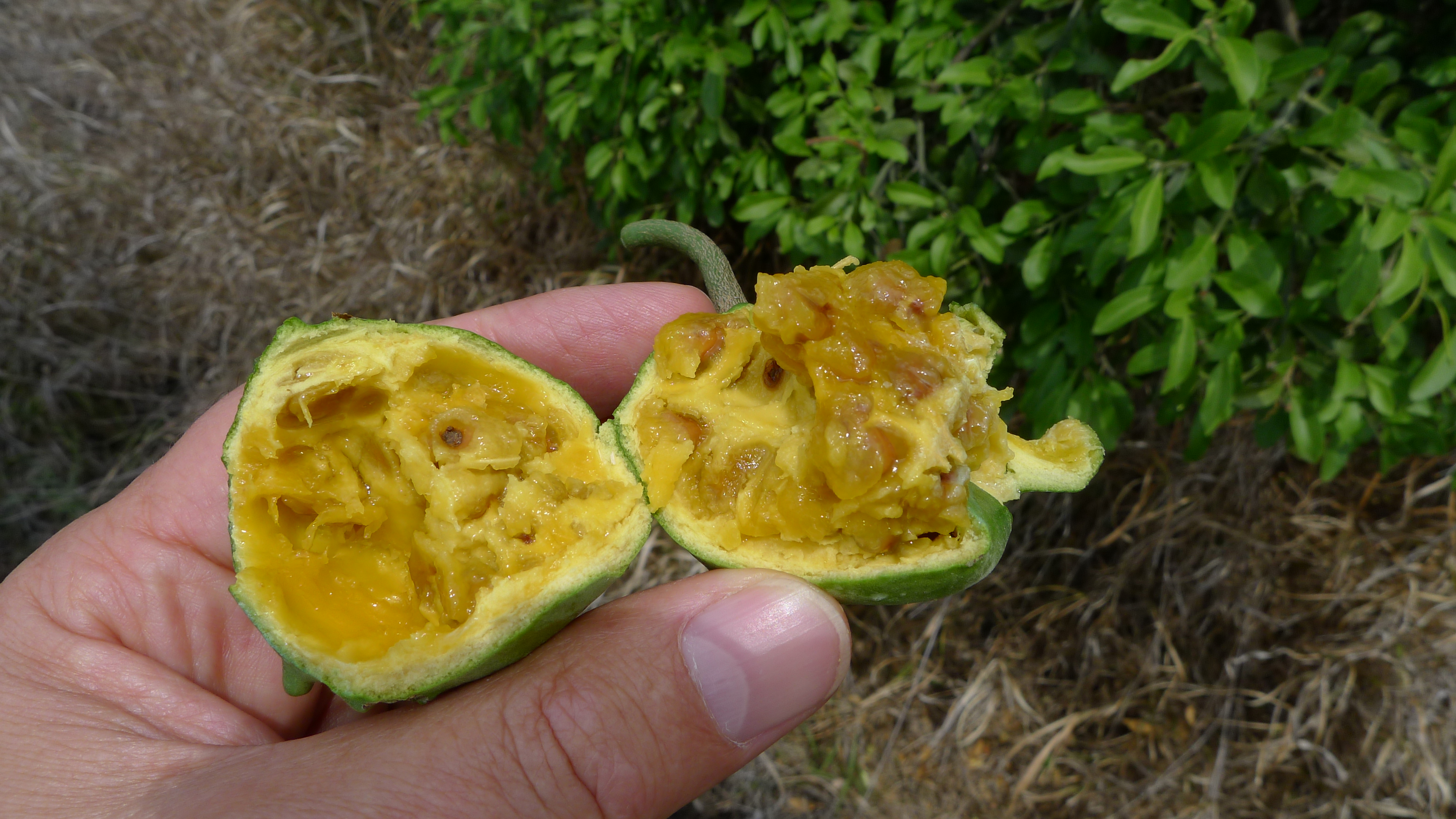

== Pests ==
The fruit often suffers from caper white butterfly larvae infestation, and is one of the preferred foods of the spotted bowerbird.
