= 2006 Brownlow Medal =

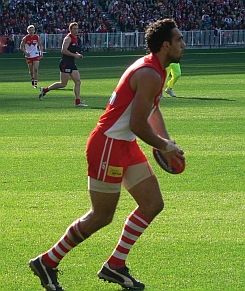
- 2006 Brownlow Medallist, Adam Goodes
- Date: 25 September
- Location: Crown Palladium
- Hosted by: Stephen Quartermain
- Winner: Adam Goodes (Sydney); 26 votes

Television/radio coverage
- Network: Network Ten

The 2006 Brownlow Medal was the 79th year the award was presented to the player adjudged the fairest and best player during the Australian Football League (AFL) home and away season. Adam Goodes of the Sydney Swans won the medal by polling twenty-six votes during the 2006 AFL season. It was Goodes' second Brownlow Medal win, after his victory in 2003.

== Leading vote-getters ==
	Player	Votes
1st	Adam Goodes (Sydney)	26
2nd	Scott West (Western Bulldogs)	23
	Daniel Kerr (West Coast)*	22
3rd	Chris Judd (West Coast)	21
4th	Brad Johnson (Western Bulldogs)	19
=5th	Shaun Burgoyne (Port Adelaide)	15
=5th	Brendon Lade (Port Adelaide)	15
=5th	Matthew Pavlich (Fremantle)	15
8th	Paul Chapman (Geelong)	14
=9th	Jonathan Brown (Brisbane)	13
=9th	Sam Mitchell (Hawthorn)	13
=9th	Nathan Thompson (Kangaroos)	13
=9th	Danyle Pearce (Port Adelaide)	13
=9th	Ben Cousins (West Coast)	13

* The player was ineligible to win the medal due to suspension by the AFL Tribunal during the year.

== Voting procedure ==
The three field umpires (those umpires who control the flow of the game, as opposed to goal or boundary umpires) confer after each match and award three votes, two votes, and one vote to the players they regard as the best, second-best and third-best in the match, respectively. The votes are kept secret until the awards night, and they are read and tallied on the evening.

As the medal is awarded to the fairest and best player in the league, those who have been suspended during the season by the AFL Tribunal (or, who avoided suspension only because of a discount for a good record or an early guilty plea) are ineligible to win the award; however, they may still continue to poll votes.
