= Adam Goodes =

Australian rules footballer (born 1980)

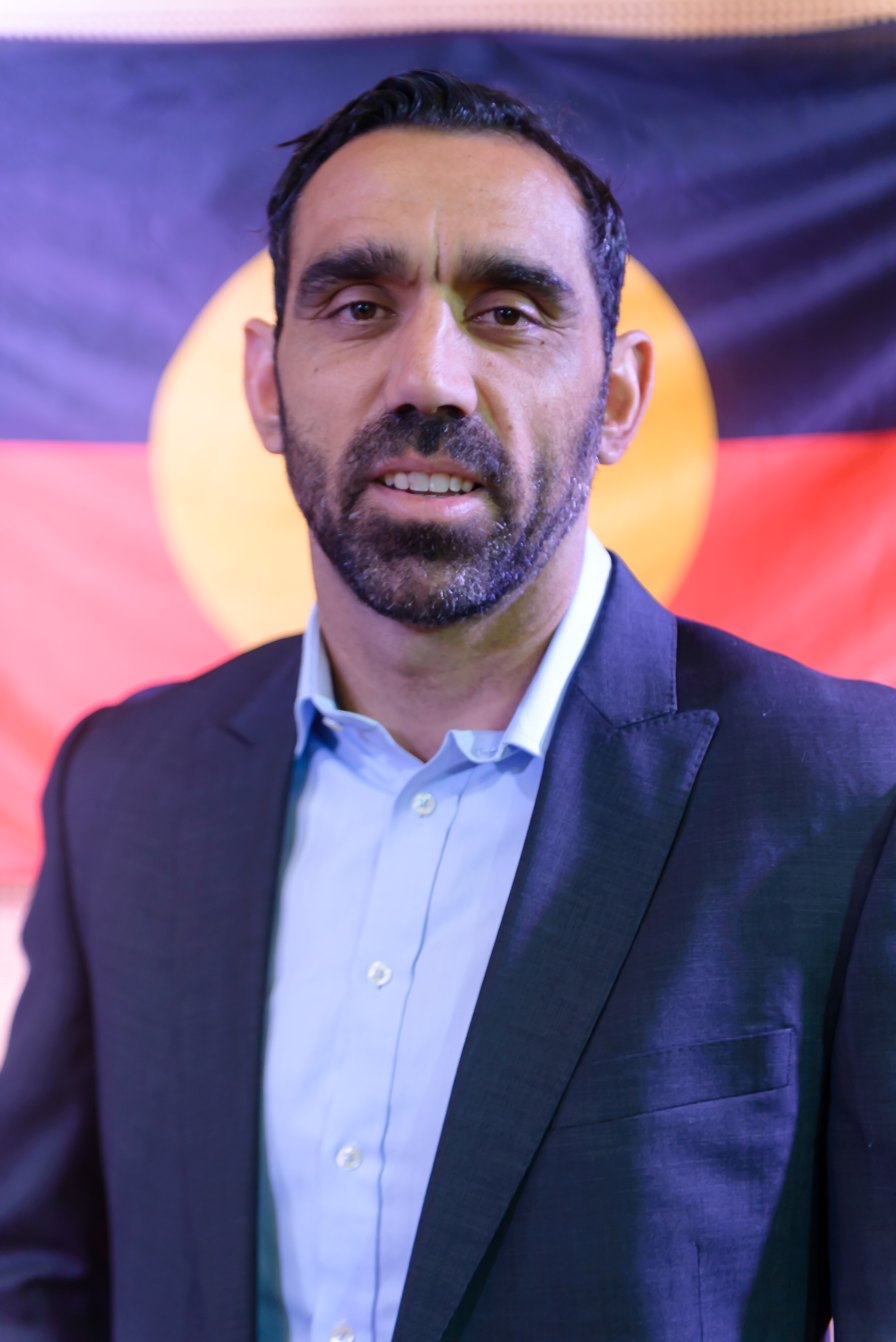
- Goodes in 2014

Personal information
- Full name: Adam Roy Goodes
- Born: 8 January 1980 (age 46); Wallaroo, South Australia, Australia
- Original team: North Ballarat Rebels/Horsham Demons
- Draft: No. 43, 1997 National Draft
- Height: 191 cm (6 ft 3 in)
- Weight: 100 kg (220 lb)
- Position: Utility

Playing career^{1}
| Years | Club | Games (Goals) |
| 1998–2015 | Sydney | 372 (464) |

Representative team honours
| Years | Team | Games (Goals) |
| 2008 | Victoria | 1 (0) |

International team honours
| 2001–2010 | Australia | 4 (3) |
- ^{1} Playing statistics correct to the end of 2015.

Career highlights
- 2× Brownlow Medal (2003, 2006); 2× AFL Premiership (2005, 2012); 3× Bob Skilton Medal (2003, 2006, 2011); 4× All Australian (2003, 2006, 2009, 2011); 3× Sydney leading goalkicker (2009, 2010, 2011); AFL Rising Star 1999; Indigenous Team of the Century; Australian of the Year 2014

Adam Roy Goodes (born 8 January 1980) is a former professional Australian rules footballer who played for the Sydney Swans in the Australian Football League (AFL). Goodes holds an elite place in VFL/AFL history as a dual Brownlow Medallist, dual premiership player, four-time All-Australian, member of the Indigenous Team of the Century and representative of Australia in the International Rules Series. In addition, he has held the record for the most VFL/AFL games played by an Indigenous player, surpassing Andrew McLeod's record of 340 during the 2014 AFL season before having his own record surpassed by Shaun Burgoyne during the 2019 AFL season.

Known for his community work and anti-racism advocacy, Goodes was named the Australian of the Year in 2014. From 2013, his outspokenness on racial issues contributed to his being the target of a sustained booing campaign from opposition fans, causing him to take indefinite leave from the AFL and eventually retire from the game at the end of the 2015 season. The "booing saga" sparked a national debate about racism in Australia and became the subject of two documentary films, both released in 2019. That year, the AFL formally apologised to Goodes for not taking greater action to defend him against fan abuse.

== Early life and family ==
Goodes was born in Wallaroo, South Australia, to Lisa May and Graham Goodes, with siblings Jake and Brett. Goodes' father is of English, Irish and Scottish ancestry; his mother is an Aboriginal Australian (Adnyamathanha and Narungga), and is one of the Stolen Generation.

Goodes' parents were separated when he was four; his father moved to Mackay, Queensland, while Goodes moved between Wallaroo and Adelaide and Merbein with his mother.

Goodes preferred soccer as a boy, playing in South Australia. While at Merbein, he attended primary school at Merbein West Primary School in 1986, and it was there that he began to play Australian rules football as there was no soccer club for him to join. He moved with his family to Horsham, Victoria, where he played football at high school and represented at under-16 and under-18 levels. At age 16, he began playing with the North Ballarat Rebels in the TAC Cup. Goodes played in a winning premiership side with the Rebels, where he was scouted by the Sydney Swans.

Goodes took his mother to the Brownlow Medal ceremony in 2003 in which he shared the medal with Nathan Buckley of the Collingwood Football Club and Mark Ricciuto of the Adelaide Football Club.

Brett, who is four years younger than Adam, played 22 AFL games for the Western Bulldogs between 2013 and 2015.

== AFL career ==
=== Early career ===
Goodes was drafted by Sydney into the Australian Football League as the 43rd pick in the 1997 AFL draft, Sydney's third round draft pick. He spent the 1998 season in the reserves competition, but broke into the first team the following year and went on to win the league's Rising Star Award.

During 2000 and 2001, Goodes played in a variety of positions, developing his game but lacking consistency at times. He played every game during this period. In early 2002, however, his form had slumped, and it had been suggested that he may be dropped. However, coach Rodney Eade resigned mid-season and under interim (later permanent) coach Paul Roos, Goodes found himself playing more in the ruck. In the second half of that season his form improved immensely. After injuring his knee twice in the ruck, he moved to play on the wing and went on to win two Brownlow Medals.

=== 2003−2007: Brownlow Medal success ===
In 2003, Goodes returned to the ruck position for significant parts of the year in what became his best season to that point. He played a critical role in the Swans' revival and eventual preliminary final game that year. In particular, his efforts were crucial in the Swans' win against Port Adelaide in the qualifying finals.

At the end of the season, Goodes won the club's best and fairest award, the Bob Skilton Medal, and received All-Australian selection for the first time. However, his greatest achievement was winning the league's highest personal honour, the Brownlow Medal, alongside Collingwood's Nathan Buckley and Adelaide's Mark Ricciuto. This was the second time in the history of the medal that the award was shared between three players (the first time was in 1930). Goodes attributed his success to his longtime mentor John Winter.

Goodes had a substandard 2004, much like his team, who only managed the semi-finals stage of the finals series. He did not repeat his efforts of 2003, mainly due to knee injuries, yet he still managed to play every game. The knee injuries were due to an awkward fall during the season while playing in the ruck against the West Coast Eagles. Many expected Goodes to have suffered a posterior or anterior knee ligament damage, but he battled on. After this injury, coach Roos announced that Goodes' rucking days were over and that he would be used in other positions. He played in the backline for the remainder of 2004.

Goodes returned to form in 2005, playing mainly in the midfield. His year was highlighted with a near match-winning 33 disposals in round 18 against the Adelaide Crows. He played well in the 2005 Grand Final, kicked a goal and gathering 20 possessions as the Swans won their first premiership since 1933. He was also awarded life membership of the Swans after playing his 150th game during the year.

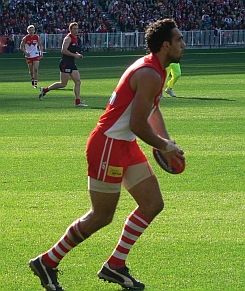
Goodes playing for Sydney in 2006

In Round 7, 2006, Goodes played his 150th consecutive match, a notable effort with the injuries he had in 2004. By the end of the 2007 season, he had played 191 consecutive matches. He returned to the ruck position in 2005 and 2006, but only occasionally around the ground and not at centre bounces where his knee injury occurred.

In 2006, Goodes had another notable year and again won the Brownlow Medal. He came into the count as a heavy favourite and became the twelfth player to have won two or more Brownlow Medals, the first Aboriginal Australian to win two, and the first player to win two with a non-Victorian club. Goodes said of his performance, "I'd like to think with another couple of years in the midfield I could improve again.". Goodes had a poor performance in the first half of the 2006 Grand Final against the West Coast Eagles in a repeat of 2005. However, he turned on the heat in the second half with his team coming close (losing by one point).

At the end of the year he was once again selected in the All-Australian team.

=== 2007–2011 ===
Seasons 2007 and 2008 saw Goodes drop off in form, but he was still instrumental in Sydney's finals campaigns. He had Brownlow Medal–threatening suspensions and charges during both years. In 2008, he missed games either through suspension or injury for the first time since 2000. His 2007 season ended strongly for him, as he received 16 of a possible 18 Brownlow Medal votes in the last six games of the year.

Goodes played his 250th game in 2009, against Geelong. He was arguably one of the best players throughout the 2009 season, playing in the forward line because of Barry Hall's mid-season departure. He finished the season with 38 goals and averaged 21 disposals. From 2006 to 2009 he received 84 Brownlow votes, which equated to 21 per season, easily a winning tally in years gone by considering he had drawn 22 votes during 2003's success. From 2007 to 2009, he played career-best football in the eyes of some critics and perhaps better than 2003 or 2006 as evidenced by a career-high eight goals against Fremantle in 2008 and more accurate goalkicking when in the forward 50. Goodes played some high-standard football in 2009 in what was a relatively disappointing season in which the Swans finished 12th and failed to make the finals for the first time in six years. He also polled three Brownlow Medal votes in the Round 7 match against Geelong, which Sydney lost by 51 points.

In 2010, Goodes averaged about 20 disposals and two goals a game, having been at the forefront of Sydney's revival. They finished the season in fifth position. Having started the season at centre half-forward and providing a target inside 50 for much of the year, Goodes was shifted into the midfield with success. He finished sixth in the Bob Skilton Medal and was named in the initial 40 player All-Australian squad but not in the final side. He was also named captain of the International Rules squad to play in Ireland in October.

After a strong 2009 season and an occasional move to half-forward, Goodes was selected last but managed to sneak into the 2009 All-Australian team on the interchange bench.

Goodes started 2011 playing mostly in the Swans' forward line. While his ball-winning was considered as good as ever, his goal-kicking became somewhat inconsistent. In a match against Essendon that season, Goodes had a chance to win the game for Sydney with his team down by two points, but his shot at goal drifted to the left, losing the game for Sydney by a solitary point.

Goodes played his 300th AFL game when the Sydney Swans tackled Hawthorn in a second semi-final, losing by 36 points. He became the quickest player (though not the youngest) in AFL history to reach the milestone, breaking 2003 joint-Brownlow Medalist Mark Ricciuto's record by 274 days. His late-season surge in form saw him selected in the 2011 All-Australian team in the forward pocket. This was his fourth selection in the team.

In 2011, Goodes started as the second favourite for the Brownlow but finished eighth overall, and won the 2011 Sydney Swans' Best and Fairest, beating Josh Kennedy and Rhyce Shaw, who tied for second.

=== 2012−2015: Career twilight and retirement ===
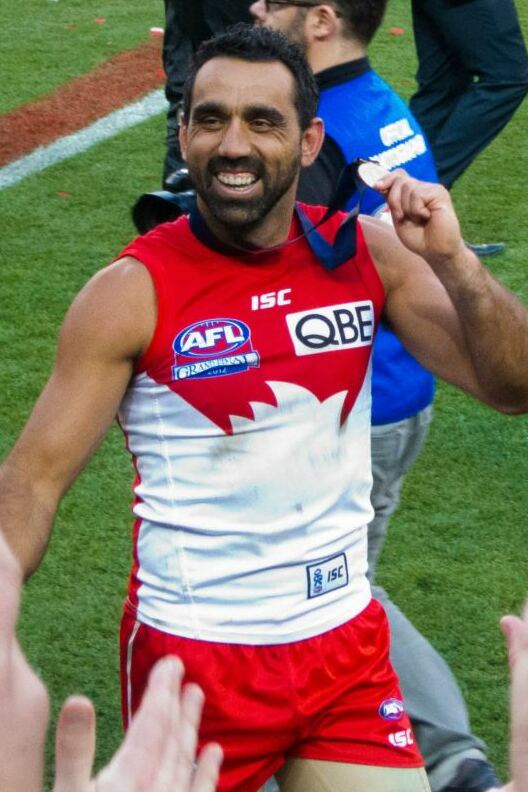
Goodes during a lap of honour after winning the 2012 AFL Grand Final

Goodes broke the Sydney games record when he played his 304th AFL game with a strong contribution in the Swans' Round 5, 2012, victory over Hawthorn at York Park in Launceston, Tasmania. He suffered a quad injury in Round 6 and was expected to miss up to six games. Goodes played in his second premiership when Sydney defeated Hawthorn in the 2012 AFL Grand Final.

Goodes announced his retirement from the AFL after the 26-point semi-final loss to North Melbourne in 2015. Goodes declined an invitation to be inducted into the Australian Football Hall of Fame. This rejection was widely seen as an indication by Goodes that the AFL had acted insufficiently to curb racism.

== Other activities and honours ==
Goodes is of Aboriginal descent and is active in the Sydney Indigenous community. He has spent time working with troubled Indigenous youth, including those in youth detention centres, along with his cousin and former teammate Michael O'Loughlin. Goodes and O'Loughlin have also helped to start an Indigenous football academy. In September 2009 they launched the Goodes O'Loughlin Foundation, a foundation aimed at empowering the next generation of Indigenous role models in all walks of life across Australia. Goodes and O'Loughlin co-chair the foundation, which focuses on education, employment and healthy lifestyles.

In 2014, he was named Australian of the Year.

In September 2017, Goodes was awarded an honorary doctorate by the University of Sydney for his contribution to Australian society.

A painting of Goodes by Vincent Namatjira won the 2020 Archibald Prize. It was the first win by an Indigenous artist in the almost 100-year history of the Art Prize.

Goodes was patron of the 2020 Indigenous Football Week, an event founded in 2015 by the John Moriarty Foundation, an organisation supporting young Indigenous soccer players.

On 10 October 2023, Goodes was one of 25 Australians of the Year who signed an open letter supporting the Yes vote in the Indigenous Voice referendum. The letter was initiated by psychiatrist Patrick McGorry.

=== Publications ===
Goodes wrote an essay entitled "The Indigenous Game: A Matter of Choice", published in The Australian Game of Football Since 1858 (2008). The essay concerns the Aboriginal ball game, Marngrook, and its theorised link to the origins of Australian rules football. In it, Goodes wrote: "I don't know the truth, but I believe in the connection. Because I know that when Aborigines play Australian Football with a clear mind and total focus, we are born to play it."

Appearing on The Marngrook Footy Show on NITV in a discussion about the origins of the game shortly after publication of the book, AFL historian Gillian Hibbins called Goodes a "racist", adding: "If you define racism as believing a race is superior in something, this is basically what he was doing." This view was challenged and criticised.

=== GO Foundation ===
Goodes, Michael O'Loughlin and James Gallichan founded the GO Foundation in Dareton, New South Wales, in 2011, where it was involved in various community programs for the local Aboriginal population. In 2014, it started focusing on education for Indigenous Australians and established a board of directors. Founding partners include the Sydney Swans, Allens Linklaters, QBE Insurance and KPMG Australia. After starting with a few scholarships to independent schools, by 2021 GO had expanded into 26 mostly public schools as well as five universities.

== Booing saga ==
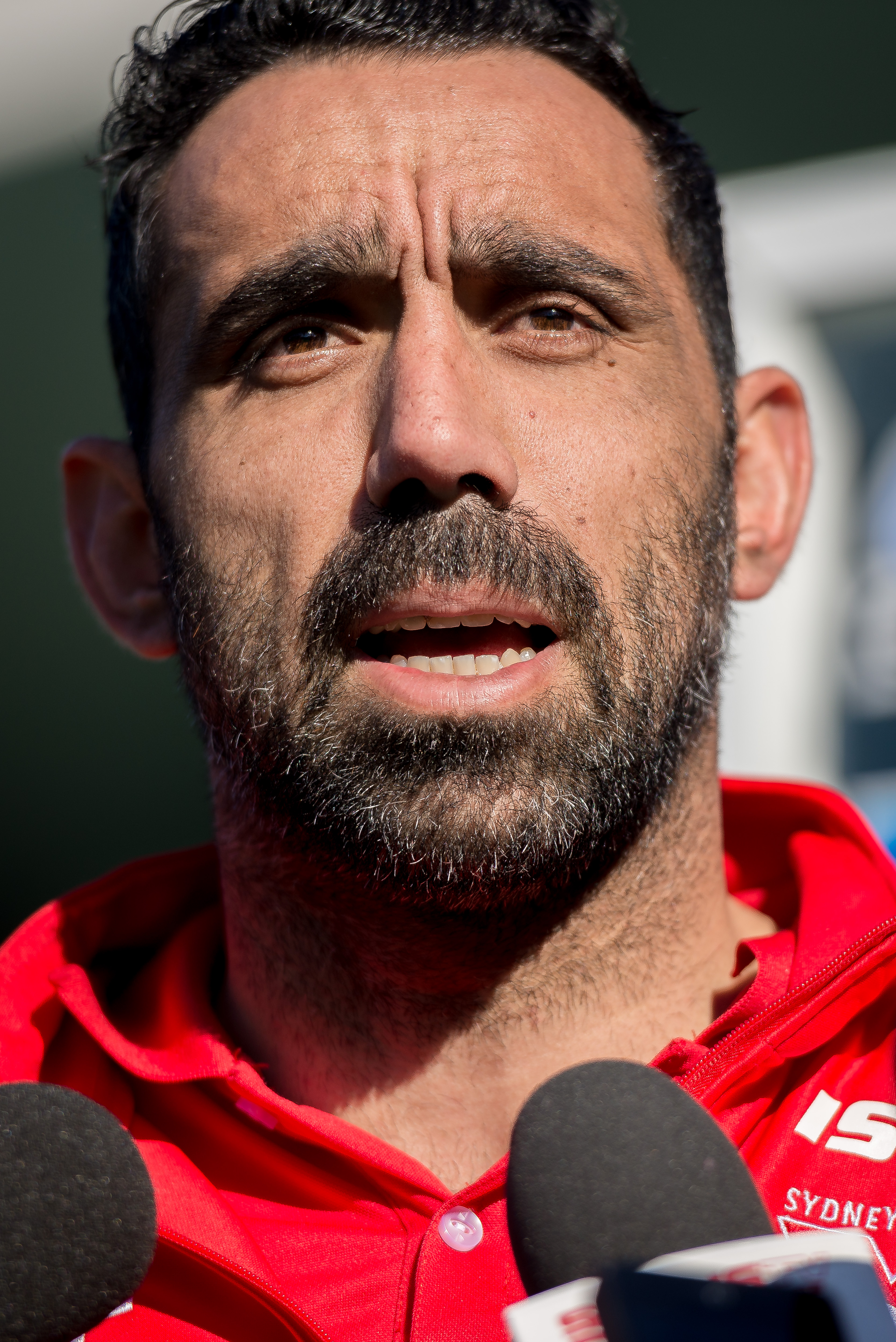
Goodes at a Sydney Swans press conference in 2014

On 24 May 2013, during the AFL's annual Indigenous Round, a 13-year-old Collingwood supporter called Goodes an "ape". Upon hearing the abuse, Goodes pointed the girl out to security, who ejected her from the stadium. After the game, Collingwood president Eddie McGuire apologised to Goodes on behalf of the club. McGuire said that Collingwood had a zero-tolerance policy towards racism, but also said that the girl, who later apologised to Goodes, did not know that what she had said was a racial slur. Goodes said that he was "gutted" and that he had "never been more hurt" but nevertheless called on the community to support the girl instead of blame her. He spoke to her the following day after she phoned to apologise, saying that she had not realised how deeply it had affected him. Goodes repeated that the girl should not be blamed; the environment that she grew up in had shaped her response. The situation would be inflamed further five days later when McGuire joked on radio that Goodes would be a good person to advertise the new theatrical run of King Kong. McGuire, who came to Goodes' defence just five days prior, claimed three years later that his joke was made while on "heavy-duty painkillers".

Over the following years, and particularly in 2015, Goodes was repeatedly and loudly booed by opposition fans at most matches. The motivation for, and acceptability of, the booing generated wide public debate, which dominated media coverage from both sports and political commentators for weeks at a time. The then Prime Minister of Australia, Tony Abbott, called on people to treat Goodes with "civility and respect". Many considered the booing to be unacceptable and motivated by racism—either because those booing felt affronted by his race or by the strong political positions Goodes had taken on racial issues—and called on the AFL to take direct action to stop it. Others, such as commentator Sam Newman, defended the rights of fans to continue booing as a show of disapproval for Goodes' actions, including a perception that his approach in dealing with the Collingwood fan who called him an ape was heavy-handed, and for statements he had made during his time as Australian of the Year which had been seen to denigrate the history of European settlement of Australia. The booing of Goodes has also been described as a symptom of tall poppy syndrome.

The AFL Players' Association and captains showed solidarity with Goodes, releasing an open statement that included the words "We encourage supporters to demonstrate zero tolerance and report any behaviour which vilifies a person on the basis of their personal characteristics, such as race, religion, gender or sexual orientation. We would encourage every other fan to follow suit."

During a match against Carlton in May 2015, again during the AFL's annual Indigenous Round, Goodes celebrated a goal by performing an Indigenous war dance in which he mimed throwing a boomerang (though widely reported as a spear) in the direction of the Carlton cheer squad. Goodes said after the incident that the dance was based on one he learned from under-16s Indigenous team the Flying Boomerangs and that it was intended as an expression of Indigenous pride during Indigenous Round, not as a means of offending or intimidating the crowd. The "symbolic act" has been compared favourably to Nicky Winmar lifting his guernsey during the 1993 AFL season and Cathy Freeman running with both the Australian and Aboriginal flags at the 1994 Commonwealth Games. However, some spectators were offended by the perceived aggressive nature of the apparent spear-throwing gesture, and many considered it retaliatory against the booing he had received in previous weeks. It divided opinion among News Corp commentators, with many viewing it as inflammatory to the situation which had received particularly wide media coverage during the previous week. The booing of Goodes intensified in the months after the war dance, leading further public debate and to the Indigenous affairs minister, Nigel Scullion, calling the booers "ignorant". Goodes was surprised by the attention and negative reaction to his dance and later apologised for any offence, saying that because he was depicting an "Aboriginal warrior" and the ceremony was a "war cry", it needed to be directed at the opposing team's players.

=== Departure from the game ===
Owing to the stress caused by the booing and attention, Goodes took indefinite leave from the game in August of the 2015 season. Many clubs and players in the AFL supported Goodes in the week of his leave by wearing Indigenous-themed guernseys or armbands and a video was prepared by the eighteen club captains to discourage the crowd from booing. He returned the following week and played for the remainder of the season after an outpouring of support on social media; and from fans, actors, politicians, celebrities and teammates, including two spontaneous standing ovations.

Goodes retired from AFL in September 2015. He did not attend the grand final, where retiring players traditionally take part in a parade, one of only a handful of players to decline this invitation since the parade for retiring players was established.

=== Apology ===
In April 2019, on the eve of the premiere of one of the documentary films about the controversy and how it affected Goodes, The Final Quarter, the AFL and all of its 18 clubs, including Sydney, issued an unreserved apology for the sustained racism and events which drove Goodes out of the game. They said:

Adam, who represents so much that is good and unique about our game, was subject to treatment that drove him from football. The game did not do enough to stand with him, and call it out. Failure to call out racism and not standing up for one of our own let down all Aboriginal and Torres Strait Islander players, past and present. Our game is about belonging. We want all Australians to feel they belong and that they have a stake in the game. We will not achieve this while racism and discrimination exists in our game... We will stand strongly with all in the football community who experience racism or discrimination. We are unified on this, and never want to see the mistakes of the past repeated.

The statement also said that the football community "pledged to continue to fight all forms of racism and discrimination, on and off the field".

== In media and the arts ==
=== TV and advertising ===
In August 2014, his ancestry was researched and shown on the SBS TV series Who Do You Think You Are?. In 2024, he was interviewed by autistic journalism students on the ABC TV series The Assembly.

In October 2015, David Jones department stores announced the selection of Goodes as a brand ambassador. His role would include advising on matters related to Indigenous reconciliation. Besides that, Goodes also served as a product ambassador for Qantas; according to the airline's online magazine, Travel Insider, he mentioned having travelled to places such as New York City and East Africa.

=== Literature ===
Goodes was one of the contributors to Anita Heiss's 2018 biographical anthology Growing Up Aboriginal In Australia. His piece, "The Sporting Life", discussed Goodes' personal experiences of being an Aboriginal Australian athlete and the importance of sport to his culture. He also documented his early years, mentioning the story of his mother of the Adnyamathanha and Narungga peoples who was a member of the Stolen Generations.

=== In film ===
In 2019, two documentary films addressing the controversial end to Goodes' career, as well as the wider issues of racism and national identity in Australia, were released.

The Final Quarter, by filmmaker Ian Darling, had its world premiere at the Sydney Film Festival. Goodes played no part in the making of The Final Quarter but gave it his full support after watching it. On 12 June 2019, Network 10 announced that they and the WIN Network would be airing the film.

The Australian Dream, written by Wiradjuri journalist Stan Grant, premiered at the Melbourne International Film Festival in early August 2019, and it was released in Australian cinemas on 22 August 2019.

=== Art installation ===
The AFL gathers biometric data on its players via a small device worn on their backs when playing. In a project taking four years, the computerised history of Goodes' performance data was transformed into an art installation commissioned by Adelaide's MOD. (Museum of Discovery), entitled Ngapulara Ngarngarnyi Wirra (Adnyamathanha for "Our Family Tree"). The tree refers to a 500-year-old sacred red river gum, or wirra, that lives on Adnyamathanha land. Sounds have been created by an algorithm that mixes recordings of the wind and Goodes' voice speaking in the Adnyamathanha language with his performance data, while a 3D scan of the wirra and Goodes' data were combined in a point cloud, resembling stars in the sky. UNSW technologist Angie Abdilla and artist Baden Pailthorpe collaborated with Goodes in the Tracker Data Project, which is open to the public from February to December 2022.

== Statistics ==
Legend
| G | Goals | K | Kicks | D | Disposals | T | Tackles |
| B | Behinds | H | Handballs | M | Marks | H/O | Hit-outs |

| Led the league after finals only |

| Season | Team | No. | Games | Totals | | | | | | | | Averages (per game) | | | | | | | |
| Season | Team | No. | Games | G | B | K | H | D | M | T | H/O | G | B | K | H | D | M | T | H/O |
|---|---|---|---|---|---|---|---|---|---|---|---|---|---|---|---|---|---|---|---|
| 1999 | Sydney | 37 | 20 | 19 | 12 | 190 | 66 | 256 | 90 | 16 | 186 | 1.0 | 0.6 | 9.5 | 3.3 | 12.8 | 4.5 | 0.8 | 9.3 |
| 2000 | Sydney | 37 | 22 | 40 | 22 | 228 | 67 | 295 | 98 | 28 | 115 | 1.8 | 1.0 | 10.4 | 3.0 | 13.4 | 4.5 | 1.3 | 5.2 |
| 2001 | Sydney | 37 | 23 | 34 | 17 | 260 | 69 | 329 | 120 | 26 | 96 | 1.5 | 0.7 | 11.3 | 3.0 | 14.3 | 5.2 | 1.1 | 4.2 |
| 2002 | Sydney | 37 | 22 | 21 | 17 | 268 | 82 | 350 | 111 | 68 | 125 | 1.0 | 0.8 | 12.2 | 3.7 | 15.9 | 5.0 | 3.1 | 5.7 |
| 2003 | Sydney | 37 | 24 | 20 | 13 | 304 | 127 | 431 | 142 | 52 | 299 | 0.8 | 0.5 | 12.7 | 5.3 | 18.0 | 5.9 | 2.2 | 12.5 |
| 2004 | Sydney | 37 | 24 | 9 | 10 | 205 | 131 | 336 | 116 | 31 | 103 | 0.4 | 0.4 | 8.5 | 5.5 | 14.0 | 4.8 | 1.3 | 4.3 |
| 2005 | Sydney | 37 | 26 | 23 | 14 | 319 | 130 | 449 | 145 | 60 | 116 | 0.9 | 0.5 | 12.3 | 5.0 | 17.3 | 5.6 | 2.3 | 4.5 |
| 2006 | Sydney | 37 | 25 | 25 | 13 | 381 | 140 | 521 | 170 | 84 | 5 | 1.0 | 0.5 | 15.2 | 5.6 | 20.8 | 6.8 | 3.4 | 2.05 |
| 2007 | Sydney | 37 | 23 | 9 | 9 | 298 | 166 | 464 | 134 | 77 | 31 | 0.4 | 0.4 | 13.0 | 7.2 | 20.2 | 5.8 | 3.3 | 1.3 |
| 2008 | Sydney | 37 | 21 | 29 | 14 | 229 | 130 | 359 | 95 | 63 | 22 | 1.4 | 0.7 | 10.9 | 6.2 | 17.1 | 4.5 | 3.0 | 1.0 |
| 2009 | Sydney | 37 | 22 | 38 | 17 | 294 | 175 | 469 | 134 | 72 | 23 | 1.7 | 0.8 | 13.4 | 8.0 | 21.3 | 6.1 | 3.3 | 1.0 |
| 2010 | Sydney | 37 | 24 | 44 | 41 | 322 | 159 | 481 | 177 | 58 | 6 | 1.8 | 1.7 | 13.4 | 6.6 | 20.0 | 7.4 | 2.4 | 0.3 |
| 2011 | Sydney | 37 | 24 | 41 | 32 | 320 | 191 | 511 | 144 | 87 | 17 | 1.7 | 1.3 | 13.3 | 8.0 | 21.3 | 6.0 | 3.6 | 0.7 |
| 2012 | Sydney | 37 | 19 | 37 | 19 | 217 | 115 | 332 | 103 | 56 | 4 | 1.9 | 1.0 | 11.4 | 6.1 | 17.5 | 5.4 | 2.9 | 0.2 |
| 2013 | Sydney | 37 | 12 | 20 | 9 | 133 | 81 | 214 | 60 | 25 | 1 | 1.7 | 0.8 | 11.1 | 6.8 | 17.8 | 5.0 | 2.1 | 0.1 |
| 2014 | Sydney | 37 | 20 | 30 | 12 | 175 | 91 | 266 | 81 | 32 | 1 | 1.5 | 0.6 | 8.8 | 4.6 | 13.3 | 4.0 | 1.6 | 0.0 |
| 2015 | Sydney | 37 | 21 | 25 | 13 | 208 | 119 | 327 | 118 | 48 | 1 | 1.2 | 0.6 | 9.9 | 5.7 | 15.6 | 5.6 | 2.3 | 0.0 |
| Career | | | 372 | 464 | 284 | 4,351 | 2,039 | 6,390 | 2,038 | 883 | 1,197 | 1.3 | 0.8 | 11.7 | 5.5 | 17.2 | 5.5 | 2.4 | 3.2 |

== Honours and achievements ==
=== Football ===
**Brownlow Medal votes**
| Season | Votes |
| 1999 | — |
| 2000 | — |
| 2001 | 5 |
| 2002 | 2 |
| **2003** | **22** |
| 2004 | 4 |
| 2005 | 7 |
| **2006** | **26** |
| 2007 | 20 |
| 2008 | 21 |
| 2009 | 17 |
| 2010 | 13 |
| 2011 | 19 |
| 2012 | 2 |
| 2013 | 4 |
| 2014 | — |
| 2015 | 1 |
| **Total** | **163** |
Key:
Green / **Bold** = Won

Team

- AFL Premiership (Sydney): 2005, 2012
- McClelland Trophy (Sydney): 2014

Individual

- Brownlow Medal: 2003 (tied with Nathan Buckley and Mark Ricciuto), 2006
- Bob Skilton Medal: 2003, 2006, 2011
- All-Australian: 2003, 2006, 2009, 2011
- AFLCA Champion Player of the Year Award: 2006
- Herald Sun Player of the Year Award: 2006
- Australian Football Media Association Player of the Year Award: 2006
- Australian Representative Honours in International Rules Football: 2001, 2010 (C)
- Indigenous All-Stars Representative Honours: 2003
- Sydney Swans Captain: 2009–2012
- Sydney Swans Leading Club Goalkicker Award: 2009–2011
- AFL Rising Star Award: 1999
- AFL Rising Star Nominee: 1999 (Round 2)
- **Indigenous Team of the Century (centre half-back)**

=== Other awards and recognition ===
- Australian of the Year: 2014
- **Honorary Doctor of the university (DUniv)** from the University of South Australia: 2019

== Personal life ==
Adam married Natalie Croker in 2016, with whom he has three children. His first child was born in 2018.

== See also ==
- List of VFL/AFL players to have played 300 games
- List of VFL/AFL records
