= Wooltana Station =

Pastoral lease in South Australia

Coordinates: 30.413°S 139.421°E

Location in South Australia

Wooltana Station, most commonly known as Wooltana, is a pastoral lease that operates as a sheep station in outback South Australia. It lies on what were formerly the lands of the Pilatapa.

It is situated about 103 kilometres (64 mi) north east of Blinman and 259 kilometres (161 mi) north west of Broken Hill, on the plains between the northern end of the Flinders Ranges and Lake Frome.

The land is part of the traditional lands of the Adnyamathanha people. It has been recorded that the name "Wooltana" is a corruption of an Aboriginal (presumably Adnyamathanha) word, ooltulta. However, it is unclear what that word means.

The station contains the Paralana Hot Springs, which issue from rich veins of uranium ore. Carbon dioxide, nitrogen, radon and helium bubble forth continuously. Because the Springs contain small amounts of uranium and radon, staying near the Springs for a prolonged period constitutes a health hazard. Living on the floor of the Springs is an extremophile algal mat that survives the warm temperatures of 62 °C and high radioactivity. The Springs are listed on the South Australian Heritage Register as a designated place of geological significance.

== History ==
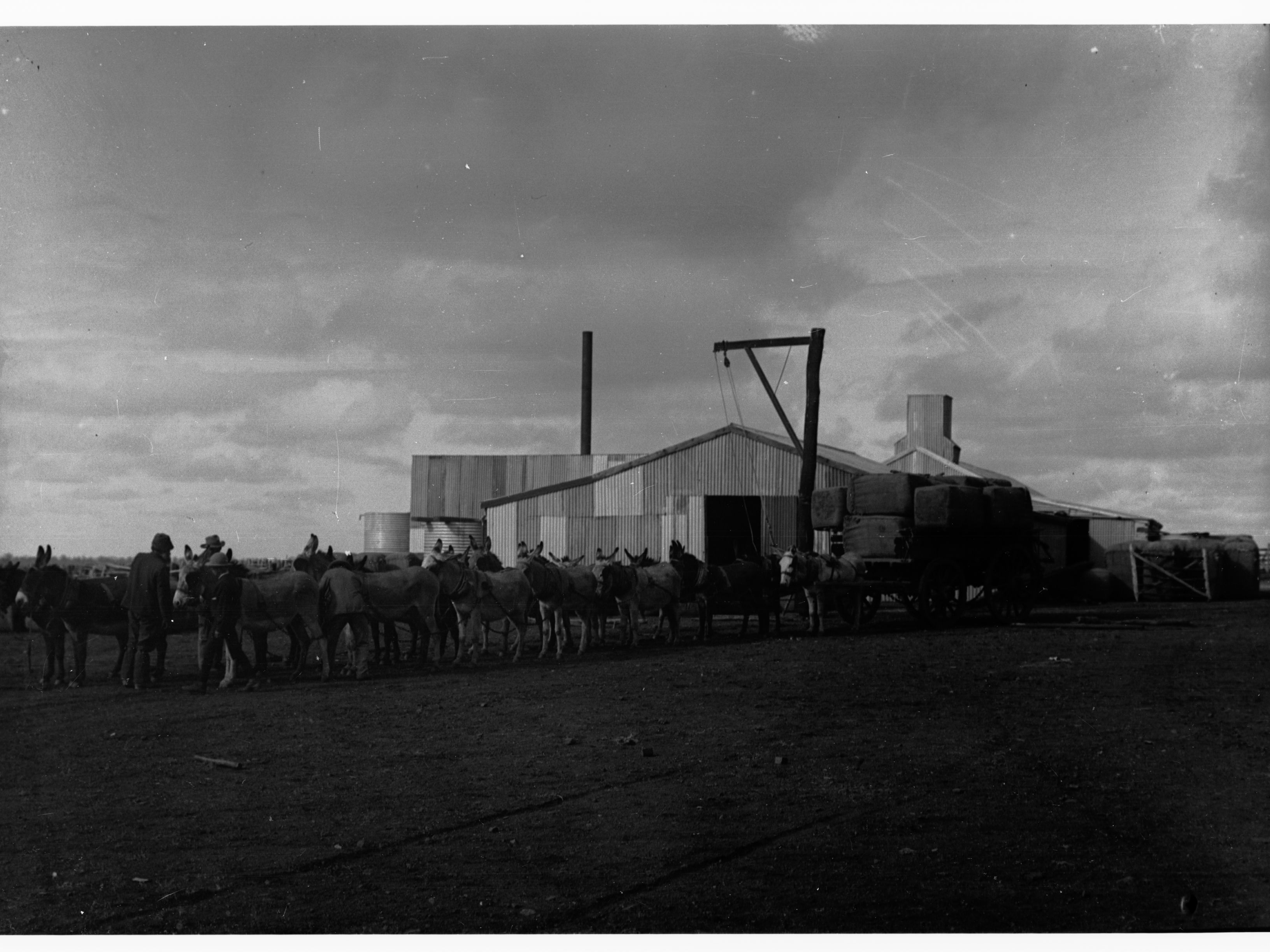
Donkey team carting wool bales at Wooltana Sheep Station, c. 1915

The station was initially established by the pioneer John McTaggart, who arrived in South Australia from Scotland in 1852. In 1856 McTaggart left the property near Mount Gambier where he was working and headed north with his brother-in-law John McCallum to search for suitable lands. Having found the plains of Wooltana, he returned to Mount Gambier and drove his flock of 1500 sheep, along with his wife and four children, via Port Augusta to Wooltana.

The McTaggarts became at this time the northernmost European settlers in South Australia, with the nearest station being Arkaba Station some 200 miles (322 km) south. The area was struck by drought from 1863 to 1865 and McTaggart retired in 1882, leaving the property in the hands of his son, Lachlan McTaggart. The property was enlarged in 1907 when McTaggart acquired the neighbouring property, Paralana Station. Paralana Station occupied an area of 600 square miles (1,554 km^{2}), and when absorbed into Wooltana, the total area was brought to 1,000 square miles (2,590 km^{2}).

A South Australian shearing record was set at Wooltana in 1912 when shearer G. Denman shore 274 sheep in 8 hours and 40 minutes. The record was broken in 1927 by a shearer from Arkaba Station completing 277.

The McTaggart family sold the property in 1918 to father and son, A.J. McBride and Philip McBride of Burra for £60,000. At the time the property comprised 1,070 square miles (2,771 km^{2}) of leasehold and was stocked with 30,000 sheep as well as cattle, horses and camels. A.J. McBride died in 1928.

In 1924 the area was affected by drought and two flocks totalling 9000 sheep were overlanded off the property to Hawker to be trucked further south. Over 30,000 sheep were shorn at Wooltana in 1928.

During the drought of 1948 over 10,000 sheep were sold off from Wooltana. Hundreds of sheep died from lack of feed in the area and the station's flock was reduced to half its size. Wild dogs became problematic during the course of the drought, feeding on weakened sheep. In 1950, Wooltana served as a base for the dropping of 90,000 wild dog baits, containing strychnine, to reduce the population of the pest.

The area was struck by drought in 1954, with rains finally falling in December, Wooltana receiving 3.02 inches (77 mm) over a two-day period. Also in 1954, John French, a 74-year-old station employee, was accidentally shot dead while kangaroo hunting with others on the station. In 1954, the station was still owned by the McBrides.

In 1984, Robert Cameron bought Wooltana for $1.9 million, believed to be a South Australian record price at that time.

The land occupying the extent of the Wooltana pastoral lease was gazetted as a locality by the Government of South Australia on 26 April 2013 under the name "Wooltana".

== See also ==
- List of ranches and stations
