= Arkaba Station =

Coordinates: 31.73125°S 138.50481°E

Location in South Australia

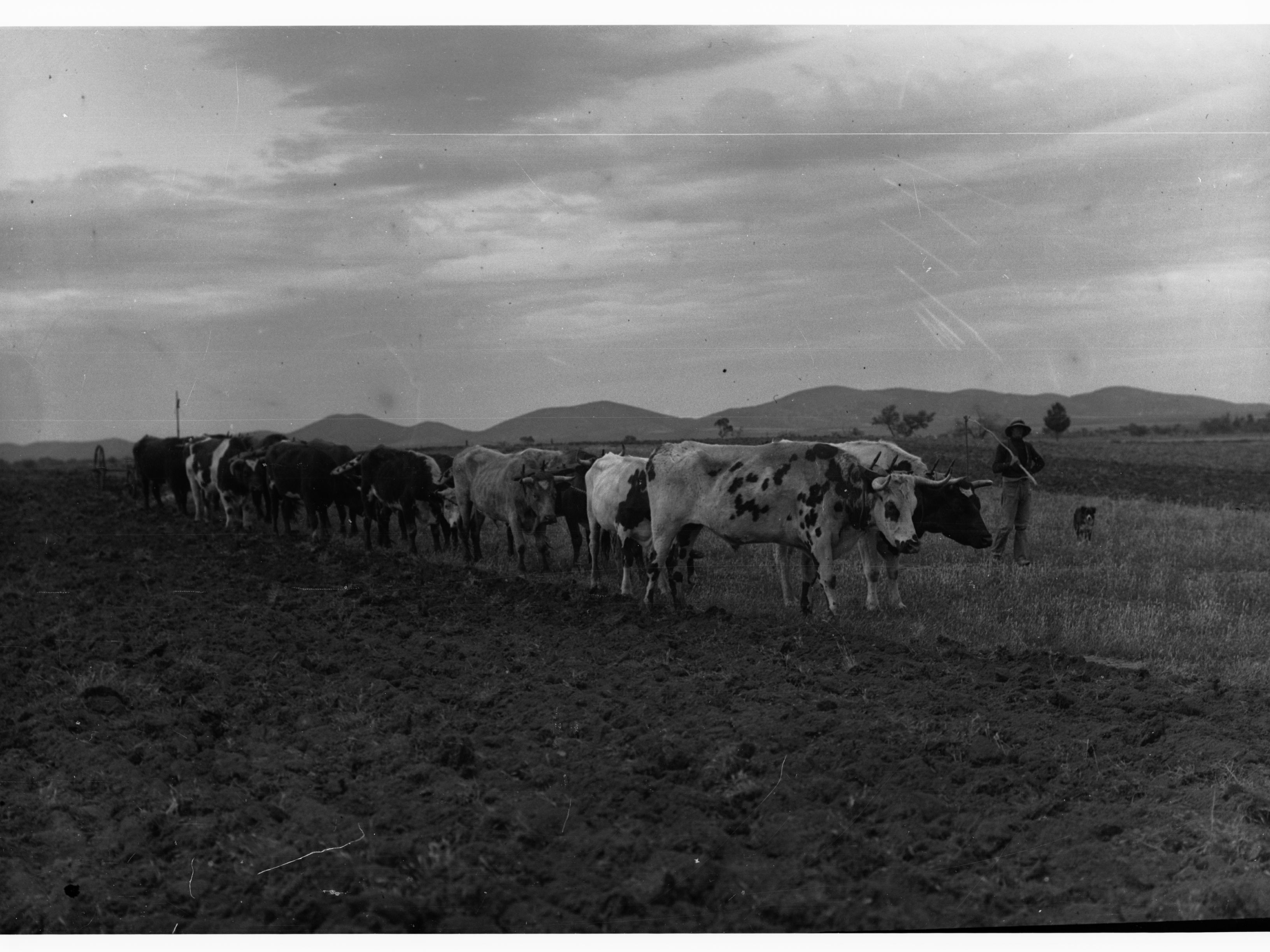
Bullock team ploughing field at Arkaba, ca. 1915

Arkaba or Arkaba Station is a part-perpetual lease, part-freehold property located about 20 kilometres (12 mi) north east of Hawker and 72 kilometres (45 mi) south of Blinman in the Flinders Ranges in the state of South Australia,

The station occupies an area of 63,500 acres (25,698 ha) and was formerly used for grazing sheep, but is now used for tourism.

The property is composed of sandstone bluffs, open plains and creek beds studded with river red gums. The natural amphitheatre of Wilpena Pound lies at the northern boundary of the property.

The word 'arkaba' is said to mean land of abundance in the local Adnyamathanha language.

== History ==
The station was initially leased by William James Browne and his brother John Harris Browne in 1851. The brothers had previously run other properties including Lyndoch, Moorak, Buckland Park, and Booborowie. The men stocked the property with 6,000 sheep which cut about 4 pounds (2 kg) of wool.

Put up for auction in 1863 by the managers, Messrs George and Frank Marchant, the station was stocked with approximately 27,000 sheep and was described as occupying an area of 275 square miles (71,225 ha) consisting of lightly timbered country, permanently watered and assessed to carry nearly 35,000 sheep. The reserve price was not met and the property was withdrawn for private sale.

An employee drowned at Arkaba in 1872 when he tried to save some camp appliances from Mundy Creek that was flooded at the time. The man, George Hocart, was moving sheep in the area with several other men when the accident happened.

An inquest into a suicide at the station was held in 1873 when the postmaster and storekeeper, George Thompson, took an overdose of laudanum. His body was found by his daughter, and the station manager, George Parkins, attempted to resuscitate him with no effect. The inquest ruled that Thompson had taken his own life under a fit of temporary insanity.

The station also produced wheat in addition to grazing sheep. Through 1889 to 1893 the property was averaging over 12 bushels per acre despite a rainfall of less than 15 inches (381 mm) per year.

A swagman was found dead in a hut at Arkaba in 1897, but no inquest was held.

A South Australian shearing record was set at Arkaba with the shearer H. R. Cutter shearing 277 sheep in 8 hours. The previous record was set in 1912 by a shearer from Wooltana Station completing 274. At this time the property was owned by Mr. O. G. Bartholomaeun.

The area experienced torrential rain for three days in the summer of 2007 which inundated much of the Flinders Ranges. Arkaba received 150 millimetres (6 in) over the three days, which is about three times the monthly average. The then owner, Dean Rasheed, said it was the largest flood in his lifetime and probably the largest since European settlement. The nearby creek was swollen to a width of 200 metres (656 ft) and 4 metres (13 ft) deep, where it had previously been completely dry. The homestead was not damaged but much of the family cemetery was swept away.

The property was sold in 2009 by the Rasheed family for $2.5 million to tourism operator, Wild Bush Luxury, which also operate a lodge at Bamurru Plains in the Northern Territory and the Maria Island Walk in Tasmania. After a $1 million refurbishment, the homestead was opened in November of the same year. Abercrombie & Kent listed the station in its top ten semi-adventure travel destinations in 2010. Nicole Kidman is listed among those who have stayed at Arkaba. The property was placed on the market again in 2012 for over A$4 million. The property was taken off the market in 2014 and then completely destocked of sheep the same year.

The property presently operates as a tourism resort and as a private wildlife conservancy, housing a maximum of 10 guests at a time.

== See also ==
- List of ranches and stations
