= Charles P. Mountford =

Australian anthropologist and photographer

Charles Pearcy Mountford O.B.E., M.A. (Adel.), Dip. Anthrop. (Cantab.)
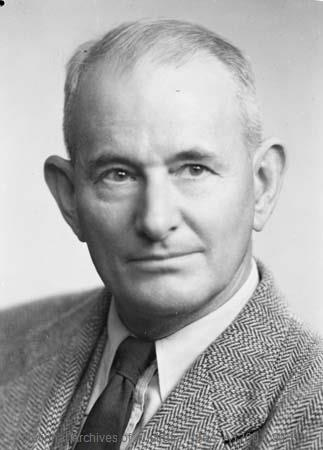
- Charles Mountford in 1947
- Born: May 8, 1890; Hallett, South Australia
- Died: November 16, 1976 (aged 86); Norwood, South Australia
- Other name: Monty
- Education: University of South Australia
- Known for: Leader, 1948 American-Australian Scientific Expedition to Arnhem Land
- Spouse(s): Florence Purnell, Bessie Ilma Johnstone
- Children: 2
- Parents: Charles Mountford (father); Arabella Windsor (mother)
- Awards: Order of the British Empire (1955); University of Melbourne honorary D. Litt. (1973); University of Adelaide honorary D.Litt. (1976); many medals
- Scientific career
- Fields: Anthropology, Indigenous Australian art
- Workplaces: University of South Australia
- Thesis: Ayers Rock, Its People, Their Beliefs and Their Art
- Academic advisors: Norman Tindale

Signature
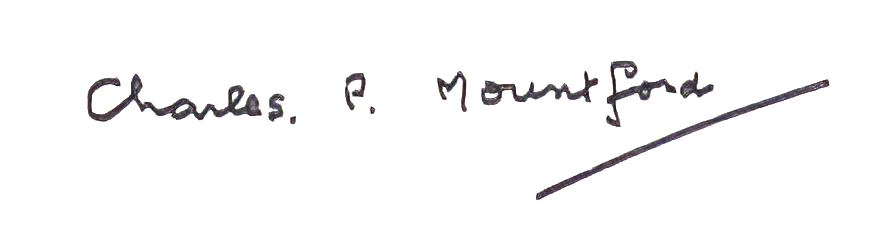

Charles Pearcy "Monty" Mountford OBE (8 May 1890 – 16 November 1976) was an Australian anthropologist and photographer. He is known for his pioneering work on Indigenous Australians and his depictions and descriptions of their art. He also led the American-Australian Scientific Expedition to Arnhem Land.

Mountford's written works, along with those by contemporaries, foreshadowed subsequent scholarly investigations like T. G. H. Strehlow's Journey to Horseshoe Bend (1969) and iconic late-20th-century works such as Stephen Muecke, Krim Benterrak, and Paddy Roe's Reading the Country: Introduction to Nomadology (1984).

Mountford's final book, Nomads of the Australian Desert, was the subject of an important court case due to its inclusion of culturally restricted content.

== Early years and education ==
Charles Pearcy Mountford was born on 8 May 1890, the son of Charles Mountford and Arabella Mountford (née Windsor) at Hallett, South Australia, where his parents and grandfather had adjoining farmlets.

The family income was constrained and they moved to Georgetown and then to the prosperous copper-mining town of Moonta. Mountford attended local public schools at Hallett, Georgetown, and Moonta. At age ten he began working at the chaff mill managed by his father, laboured at surface jobs at the copper mine, cut scrub and quarried stone, before helping his father sell stereoscope slides, an enterprise which failed after a few years, and they moved to Adelaide, residing in Woodville. He took work as a stable hand at Kilkenny, then as a striker for a blacksmith before gaining longer term employment as a conductor on the Adelaide to Hindmarsh horse tram service, continuing when the company was taken over by the MTT and when the line was electrified.

In the meantime he was studying engineering at the South Australian School of Mines and Industries.

== Career ==
In January 1913, Mountford obtained a permanent position in the engineering workshops at the General Post Office in the Engineering Branch of the Post and Telegraph Department. He was continuing studies in mathematics and natural science at the School of Mines and the University of Adelaide, although without prospect of graduating since he had never matriculated.

In 1914, he married Florence Julge Purnell at Thebarton and had two children, Kenneth Pearcy Mountford and Joyce Anna Mountford. In 1920 he was promoted to the Darwin Post Office as mechanic-in-charge, work that took him to remote outposts in which he became familiar with Aboriginal communities. Suffering poor health from the tropical climate and hard work, Mountford, aged 33, was posted back to the Adelaide GPO workshops, living at 52 West Street, Torrensville, where they were in 1916. Florence died aged 34 on 30 May 1925,

Mountford's interest in Indigenous culture and artworks in particular was revived while staying with his parents in Dawson, where his father was stationed as a Methodist missionary. They found at nearby Merowie Springs a rock with dozens of carved grooves which he traced and photographed. Ethnologist Norman B. Tindale at the South Australian Museum in Adelaide was interested and he and Mountford collaborated on a short paper "Native Markings on Rocks at Morowie, South Australia" was read to the Royal Society of South Australia in 1926, the first of many which Mountford was to present to learned societies; in 1928 he spoke again on the subject to the Australasian Association for the Advancement of Science.

=== Exploration for Indigenous art ===
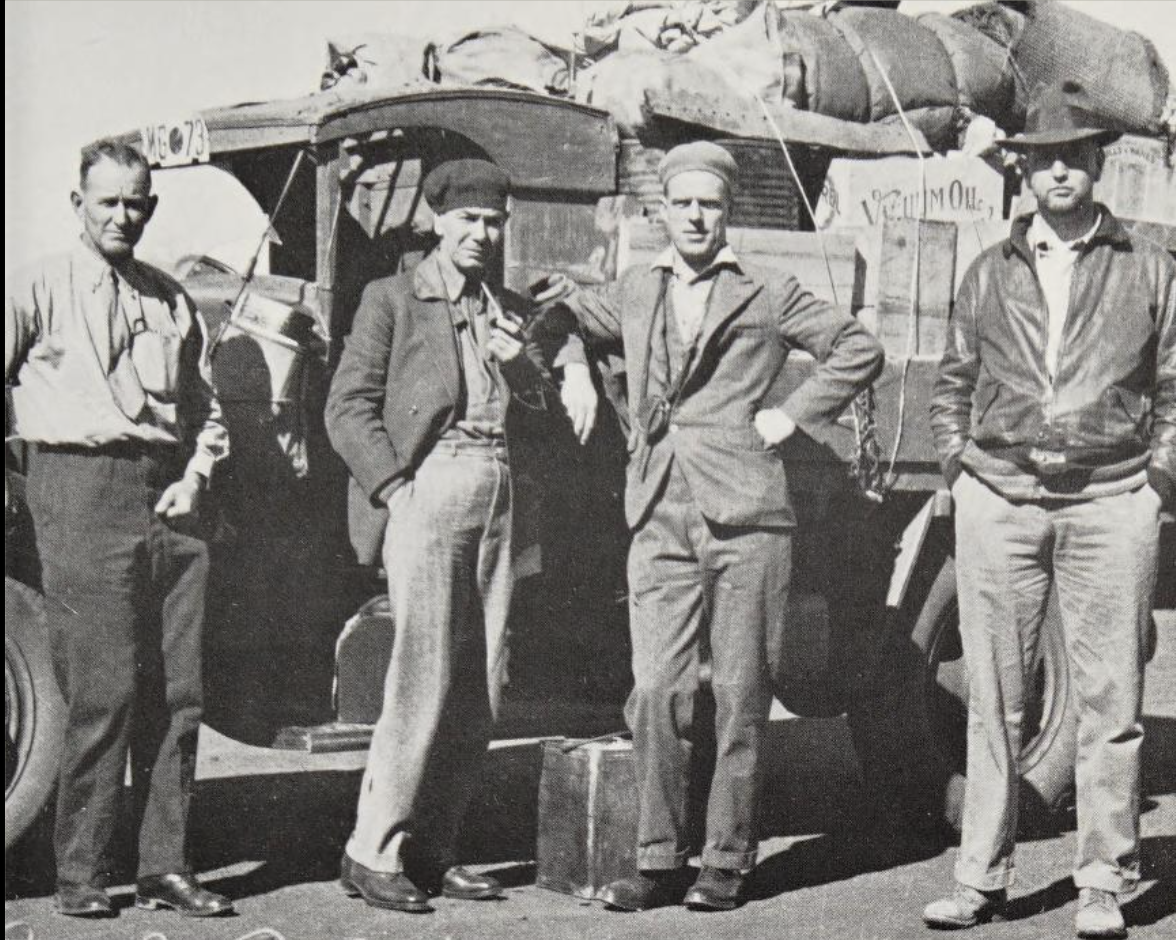
Members of the anthropological expedition to the Warburton Range in Western Australia, 1935. From left: Charles Mountford, E. O. Stocker, N. B. Tindale (leader), and Dr C. J. Hackett.

Mountford and his father became founding members of the Anthropological Society of South Australia in 1926. Encouraged by the society's president, Frederic Wood Jones, he conducted surveys of engravings in the Panaramittee and Mount Chambers Gorge areas.

On 28 October 1933, at the Gartrell Memorial Church in Rose Park, he wed Bessie Ilma Johnstone, a 42-year-old civil servant. In 1935, he took on the role of secretary for a board of inquiry tasked with investigating reports of mistreatment of Indigenous Australians in the Northern Territory, specifically at Hermannsburg and Uluru by mounted constable William (Bill) McKinnon. One of the incidents being investigated was the shooting death of Yokununna on 13 October 1934. In the same year, he joined an expedition organised by the University of Adelaide's board for anthropological research to the Warburton Range in Western Australia, alongside Tindale, C. J. Hackett, a physical anthropologist, and E. O. Stocker, a cine-photographer. Mountford contributed as a stills photographer and art recorder, amassing numerous photographs and over 400 crayon drawings illustrating various sites and dreaming tracks.

After participating in the board's expedition to the Granites in the Northern Territory in 1936, Mountford joined another expedition to the Nepabunna Mission in the Flinders Ranges of South Australia in 1937. He revisited Nepabunna multiple times, creating an unprecedented ethnographic record of the Adnyamathanha people through his photographs, recordings, and notes on mythology, material culture, and social practices. In 1938, he accompanied (later Sir) Archibald Grenfell Price's expedition to Mount Dare station to investigate a reported discovery of the remains of Ludwig Leichhardt's party.

Mountford also served as lecturer in ethnology for the Workers' Educational Association and authored further scientific papers as well as a series of newspaper articles. He had completed a two-year term as an honorary assistant in ethnology at the South Australian Museum. In addition to his anthropological work, he had conducted successful research within the Postmaster-General's Department, examining the corrosive effects of electrolysis on underground cables.

During 1938, Mountford, taking a year-long sabbatical from the Postmaster-General, served as an acting ethnologist at the South Australian Museum and conceived of taking a camel expedition to central Australia with the intention of studying the artistic expressions of the Pitjantjatjara and Yankuntjatjara peoples. Adolphus Elkin dissuaded the Carnegie trust from financing Mountford's endeavour, citing his amateur status. Nonetheless, he garnered support from the museum board for anthropological research and from private sponsors. Collaborating with Lauri Sheard and camel handler Tommy Dodd, and accompanied by Bessie, the four-month expedition in from Ernabella to Uluru in 1940 resulted in an examination of the art and mythology surrounding the landmarks Uluru and the Kata Tjuta. The results of this endeavor were showcased through photographic exhibitions and a prize-winning colour film created in 1940, which subsequently became the foundation for the book Brown Men and Red Sand.

In 1942, he embarked on a journey through the MacDonnell Ranges, meticulously documenting the art associated with sacred objects. His experiences were captured in the film Tjurunga. Notably, Mountford also produced another influential film, Namatjira the Painter, and the illustrated book The Art of Albert Namatjira (Melbourne, 1944), works which contributed to shaping his later career.

=== Brown Men and Red Sand ===
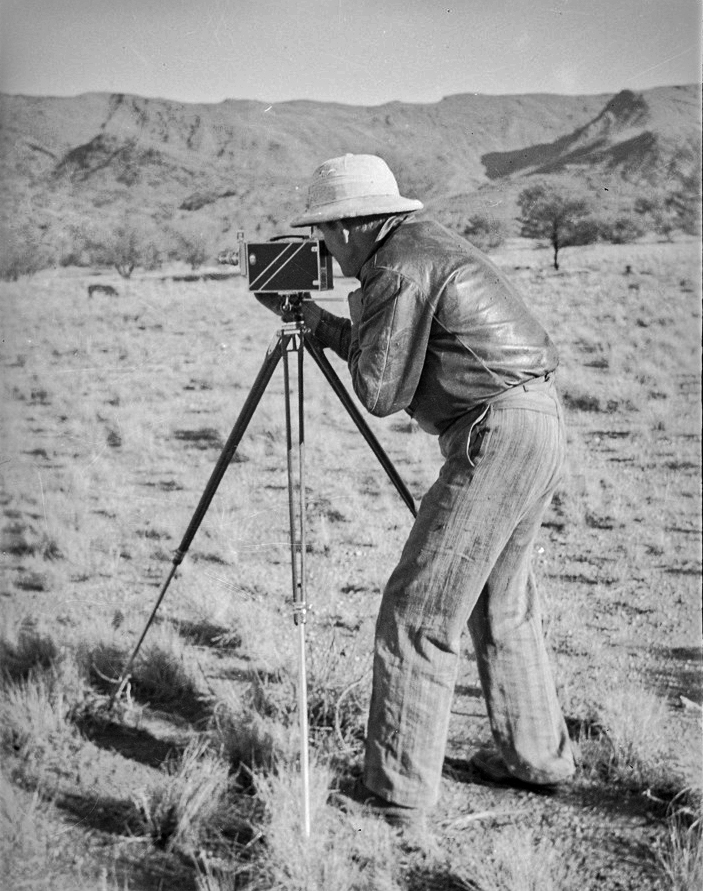
Charles Mountford filming on location in the Mann Ranges, South Australia. Mountford used film made on expeditions to Central Australia in 1940 and 1942, to produce his first documentary film 'Brown Men and Red Sand (Walkabout)'. Courtesy State Library of South Australia

Mountford's publication Brown Men and Red Sand (1948) joined a number of publications, including H. H. Finlayson's The Red Centre: Man and Beast in the Heart of Australia (1935), and Walkabout travel and geographical magazine (1934–1974), which revised Australians' concept of 'The Centre" from the picture presented in J. W. Gregory's The Dead Heart of Australia (1909).

Representative of the era's inclination towards "modular and portable" forms of travel documentation such as writing, film, and lecture tours, Mountford's films capturing Central Australia's essence prompted a lecture tour to the United States in 1945; when colour films Mountford had made, including Brown Men and Red Sands impressed the British Parliamentary Delegation when they were shown them, South Australian Premier Thomas Playford IV took Mountford to Canberra, where he showed the films to diplomats, politicians and the Department of Information, with the result that Mountford was funded by the Commonwealth Government to conduct showings and lectures in America and Britain.

== Recognition ==
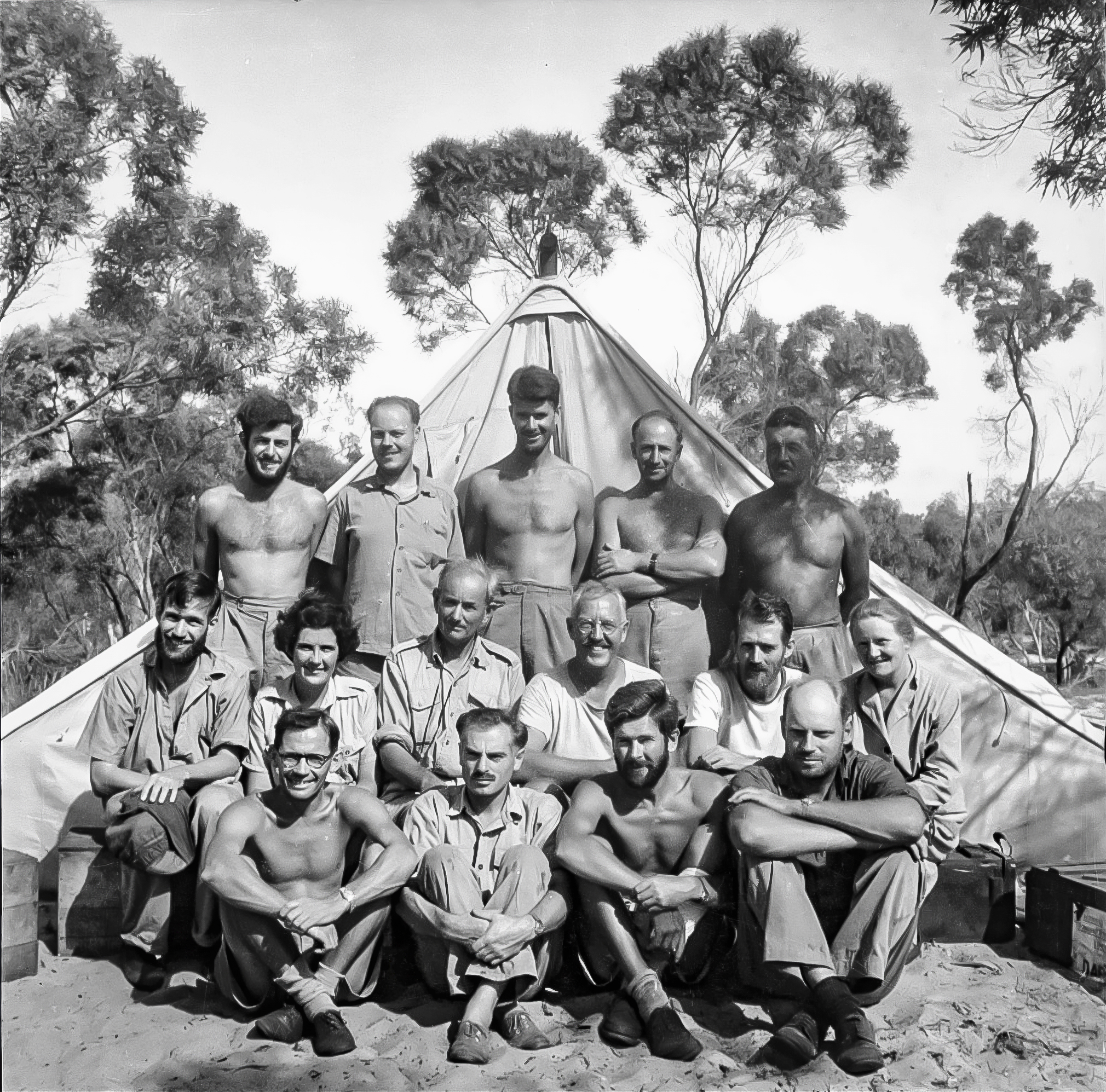
Members of the 1948 AASEAL Expedition party, on Groote Eyland, Charles Mountford 3rd from left, middle row. Mountford-Sheard Collection, State Library of South Australia

The Curator of the South Australian Museum, Philip Jones, pointed out that by the 1940s, Mountford had advanced the anthropological significance of Australia Aboriginal art before any market for such art had emerged. Furthermore, Mountford understood that Aboriginal art is fundamentally inseparable from narrative, place, and identity, transmitted through song and ceremony.

Mountford gained recognition in the US for his exceptional communication skills and knowledge of Aboriginal culture, which were enhanced by his adeptness with visual media. With the support of the Australian Director-General of Information, Mountford conducted two lecture tours in the US in 1945 and 1946, drawing an audience of four thousand Society members in Washington DC, and an account of his expeditions was featured in the January 1946 edition of National Geographic. This eventually paved the way for the establishment of the American-Australian Arnhem Land Scientific Expedition of 1948, comprising American and Australian experts in various fields, including flora, fauna, archaeology, anthropology, photography, filmmaking, and health.

In 1949, Australia members of UNESCO engaged Mountford's assistance in creating a photographic publication showcasing bark and cave paintings. With sponsorship from the Commonwealth Department of Information, Mountford returned to Oenpelli in 1949, accompanied by professional photographer W. M. Brindle, and they produced the book Australia: Aboriginal Paintings, Arnhem Land, one of UNESCO's world art series. James Cant's copies or interpretations of Ubirr rock art created a sensation when exhibited at the Berkeley Galleries in London. From 1956 to 1964, a series of volumes documenting the expedition was published, including Mountford's own on Aboriginal art.

== Memberships ==
Foundation member and past president, Anthropological Society of South Australia; foundation secretary, Australian Anthropological Association; fellow, Royal Anthropological Society of Great Britain and Ireland; member, Board for Anthropological Research, University of Adelaide; fellow of the Royal Society of South Australia; Acting Ethnologist, South Australian Museum, 1937–38; twice president, Adelaide Camera Club; member, Explorers' Club, New York, US.

== Awards ==
- 1945: Australian Natural History Medallion
- 1949: National Geographic Society Franklin L. Burr award
- 1955: O.B.E. in the Civil Division
- 1955 John Lewis gold medal of the Royal Geographical Society of Australasia (South Australian branch)
- 1955: Thomson gold medal of the Royal Geographical Society of Australasia (Queensland branch)
- 1971: Verco Medal of the Royal Society of South Australia
- 1973: University of Melbourne honorary D.Litt.
- 1976: University of Adelaide honorary D.Litt.

== Legacy ==
There is a collection of Mountford's photographs, journals, sound recordings and other works created, written and gathered by Mountford in the State Library of South Australia, known as the Mountford-Sheard Collection, which has been inscribed on UNESCO's Memory of the World. It is of cultural significance to Aboriginal Australians, particularly those in central Australia, the Flinders Ranges (Adnyamathanha people), Arnhem Land (Yolngu people) and the Tiwi Islands (Tiwi people), and the material is respectful of the people whose lives it documents. Mountford's articles on allied subjects were published in The Bulletin, Walkabout, Pacific Islands Monthly, Australasian Photo-Review and others now digitised and publicly accessible at the National Library of Australia. His publications contributed to the global exposure of Aboriginal art and the development of an international market for it and, as noted by Berndt, such artworks were sold for increasingly high prices in the US and London by 1954.

=== Nomads of the Australian Desert ===
Mountford's final book Nomads of the Australian Desert (1976) contained details and pictures of secret ceremonies that had been revealed to Mountford in confidence during his fieldwork in the 1930s and 1940s. Members of the Pitjantjara Council swiftly launched legal action and sought an ex parte injunction preventing the book's publication in the Northern Territory. They argued that the Pitjantjara men who had revealed culturally restricted information with Mountford did so on the understanding that he would not share it with women, children, or uninitiated Aboriginal men.

The plaintiffs were successful, and Justice Muirhead agreed to grant the injunction. He concluded that a number of photographs, drawings and descriptions of persons, places and ceremonies featured in the book held deep religious and cultural significance to the plaintiffs, and that their publication could harm the community.

Although this injunction only applied to the Northern Territory, the book's publishers ultimately decided to withdraw the book from sale everywhere.

Foster v Mountford was the first of several Australian court cases dealing with Aboriginal secret information.

== Works ==
- The Art of Albert Namatjira (1944)
- Brown Men and Red Sand (1948)
- Australian tree portraits (1956)
- Records of the American-Australian scientific expedition to Arnhem Land: Vol. 1 Art, myth and symbolism (1956)
- The Tiwi: their art, myth and ceremony (1958)
- Ayers Rock, its people, their beliefs and their art (1965) – his M.A. thesis which became a popular paperback
- The Dreamtime (1965), The Dawn of Time (1969), and The First Sunrise (1971) – in collaboration with artist Ainslie Roberts
- Winbaraku: and the myth of Jarapiri (1967)
- Australian Aboriginal portraits (1967)
- The Aborigines and their country (1969)
- Nomads of the Australian Desert (1976) – withdrawn after sale for cultural reasons
