= Nepabunna, South Australia =

Nepabunna
- Local government area
- Coordinates: 30°34′54″S 138°58′46″E
- Country: Australia
- State: South Australia
- Region: Far North
- Established: 1998
- Council seat: Nepabunna

Government
  - Mayor: Ian Johnson
  - State electorate: Flinders
  - Federal division: Grey

Area
  - Total: 76.37 km^{2} (29.49 sq mi)

Population
  - Total: 26 (SAL 2021)

Nepabunna, also spelt Nipapanha, is a small community in the northern Flinders Ranges in north-eastern South Australia, about 600 kilometres (370 mi) north of Adelaide. It is located just west of the Gammon Ranges, and the traditional owners are the Adnyamathanha people.

The settlement was originally established as Nepabunna Mission in 1931, becoming the local government area (LGA) of Nepabunna Community Council with the establishment of a council in 1998. Iga Warta is a separate, independently run small cultural tourism enterprise within the LGA. The Nipabanha Community Aboriginal Corporation runs the Indigenous Protected Area (IPA) over land known as Nantawarrina, once a station for mixed livestock.

At the 2016 Australian census, Nepabunna had a population of 66. Access is via the main Copley to Balcanoona road.

== History ==
The land upon which Nepabunna is situation lies within the traditional lands of the Adnyamathanha people.

=== Nepabunna Mission ===
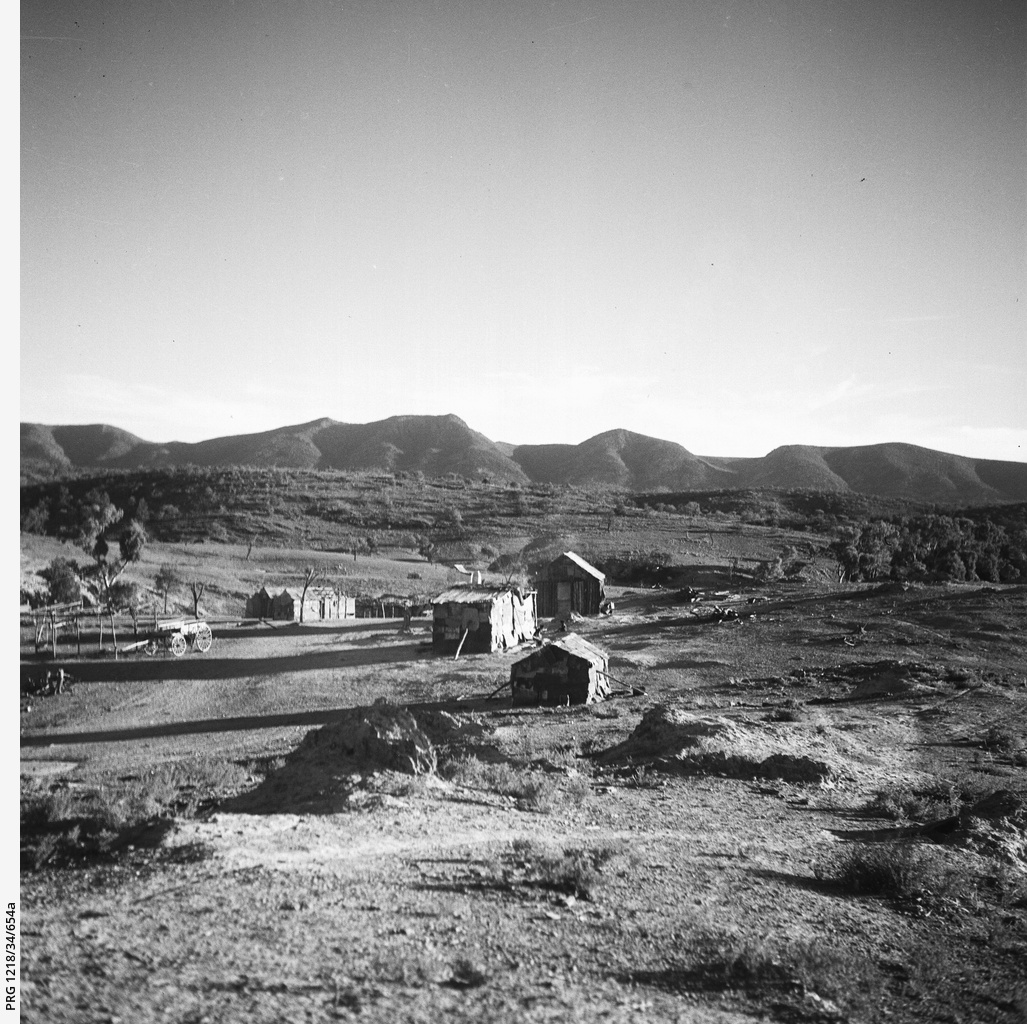
Nepabunna Mission, c.1937

The Adnyamathanha people were displaced from their traditional lands in the 1850s by pastoralists, no longer able to travel around their lands as before owing to the establishment of pastoral leases. They had been used to moving around the land because of the lack of a reliable water source, but since European settlement, they had been forced to camp in groups. One of these camps was near a place known as Damper Hill, and another, Ram Paddock. Many of them worked on the stations.

Nepabunna Mission was established in 1931 by the United Aborigines Mission, created on 52 km^{2} (20 mi^{2}) of land that was then part of Balcoona Station, given by the owner Roy Thomas. Jim Page and Fred Eaton were instrumental in the creation of the mission, and Page was remembered many years later for his kindness and for his encouragement of the continuance of traditional practices. However, this was frowned upon by others in the organisation and there were plans to investigate him, before he committed suicide at Nepabunna, where he was buried. A school was built, which was also used for church services. A dormitory was built in the 1940s, although not used for many years, but sometime after 1948 it was used to house children of parents who worked elsewhere. A government school was built in 1963.

R. M. Williams had become a missionary with the UAM in 1927, and he started a workshop nearby to develop his business making riding equipment and his trademark boots, employing not only "Dollar Mick" Smith, an Aboriginal man originally from Lyndhurst who taught Williams leatherwork skills, but also at least eight mission residents, between 1932 and 1934.

The mission passed into state government control in 1973, before being handed back to the Adnyamathanha people in 1977.

The last person born on the mission, Ronald Coulthard, died in 2014.

=== Charles Mountford ===
A University of Adelaide anthropological expedition travelled to Nepabunna in May 1937 led by J.B. Cleland, which included Charles P. Mountford as ethnologist and photographer, as well as botanist Thomas Harvey Johnston, virologist Frank Fenner, and others. Mountford was especially interested in the Adnyamathanha people's art, mythology and rituals. He came back later in the year and many times thereafter, recording Adnyamathanha language and culture. The Mountford-Sheard Collection in the State Library of South Australia shows that he had intended to write a book about them, but this was never realised. However the library has a large collection of handwritten journals, photographs, sound and film recordings gathered by him from and about the people.

== Governance ==
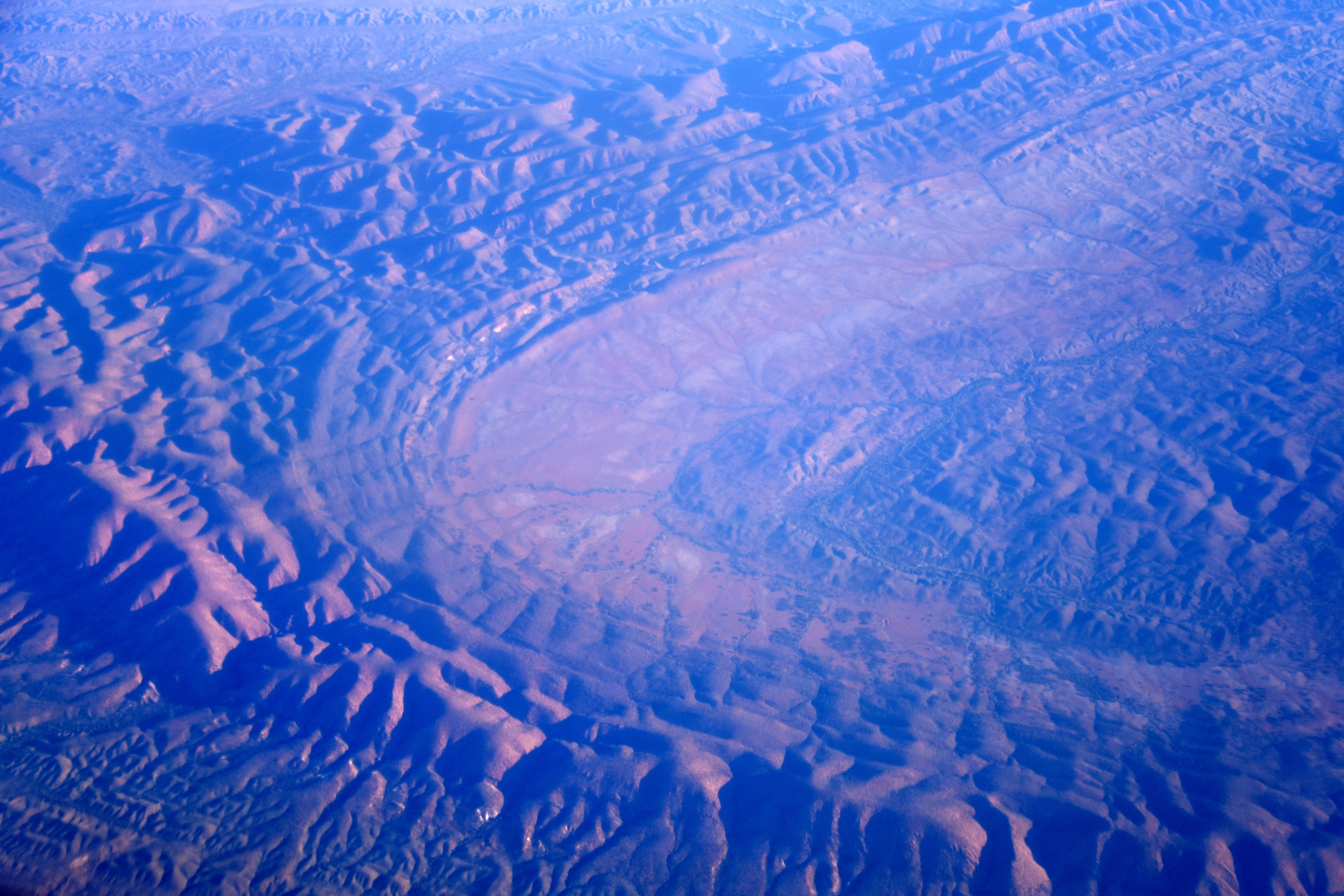
Aerial view of the Campbell Bald Hill Range, just south of Nepabunna

The LGA, established in 1998, is managed by Nepabunna Community Inc., under an ALT lease with an expiry date of 2081. The council provides housing maintenance and general municipal services as well as organising cultural tours and education and an annual gymkhana and family day.

=== Nantawarrina ===
The Nipabanha Community Aboriginal Corporation runs the Indigenous Protected Area (IPA) over land known as Nantawarrina, once a pastoral station. It was the first IPA established in Australia, in 1998.

In 1982 or 1987, more than 58,000 hectares (140,000 acres) of Adnyamathanha traditional land was purchased from a pastoralist by the South Australian Aboriginal Lands Trust (SAALT). It was first leased out for grazing, until it became obvious that the land was so degraded by overgrazing and other factors that it was no longer suitable grazing land. Around 1997, the IPA programme was just starting up, and the Adnyamathanha people at Nepabunna leapt at the chance to become part of a pilot project. The existing land would be converted into an IPA, which would become part of the Australian National Reserve System, but managed by the Nepabunna Community. The International Union for Conservation of Nature (IUCN) would help guide the project, while the federal government would provide funding for land management and preservation of cultural heritage, infrastructure and training for Indigenous rangers.

On 1 August 1998 the area, which lies adjacent to the southern boundary of the Gammon Ranges National Park, was formally proclaimed, as the "First Indigenous Protected Area in South Australia and internationally".

Since then, the rangers have replanted native vegetation, and helped to protect native animals such as the yellow-footed rock wallaby (andu). A programme of removal of feral animals, in particular goats, has been undertaken. Bores have been built and irrigation laid. Restoration work on an old homestead, Irish Well Hut, has been undertaken, and camping sites, a dormitory in a converted TAFE building, as well as separate provision for women, provide accommodation for tourists. They also provide educational and cultural tours and grow bushfoods, as a destination for those interested in sustainable tourism.

In 2000, Nantawarrina won a United Nations Environment Programme (UNEP) award, and was inscribed in the Global 500 Roll of Honour for Environmental Achievement.

The North Flinders Soil Conservation Board, National Parks and Wildlife Service (South Australia), Primary Industries and Resources SA and Save the Bush have also supported the project.

Bush Heritage Australia works with the rangers to help monitor the flora and fauna of the IPA.

=== Iga Warta ===
Iga Warta is a cultural tourism enterprise, run independently by Terrence Coulthard and his family, about 1 square kilometre (0.39 sq mi) in size. Terrence and his wife Josephine compiled the first comprehensive bilingual dictionary of the Adnyamathanha language, which includes descriptions of cultural practices, music and other features of Adnyamathanha life.

Iga Warta means "native orange", named by 19th-century English botanist John Lindley as Capparis mitchellii.

== Population and culture ==
In 2011, there were only about 30 permanent residents at Nepabunna, but the older people were encouraging younger ones to return and learn about their culture. Older adults were engaging in and teaching traditional ceremonies such as the smoking ceremony, skills such as the creation of boomerangs by woodcarving, identifying and cooking bush tucker in traditional ways, and they were passing on the dreamtime stories of the Adnyamathanha people.

At the 2006 census, 49 people were at Nepabunna, but this figure had grown to 66 by the 2016 Census.

== Access and facilities ==
The community, also spelt Nipapanha, is located just west of the Gammon Ranges. Access is via the main Copley to Balcanoona road.

In 2011 a flag of the Adnyamathanha people was created, and raised at Nepabunna on the 80th anniversary of its establishment.

There is a school, Nepabunna Aboriginal School, a church, Nepabunna Community Church, and a cemetery.
