= 2003 Brownlow Medal =

- Date: 22 September
- Location: Crown Palladium
- Hosted by: Eddie McGuire
- Winners: Nathan Buckley (Collingwood); Adam Goodes (Sydney); Mark Ricciuto (Adelaide); 22 votes

Television/radio coverage
- Network: Nine Network

The 2003 Brownlow Medal was the 76th year the award was presented to the player adjudged the fairest and best player during the Australian Football League (AFL) home-and-away season. Nathan Buckley of the Collingwood Football Club, Adam Goodes of the Sydney Swans, and Mark Ricciuto of the Adelaide Football Club all won the medal by polling twenty-two votes each during the 2003 AFL season.

Buckley and Goodes polled three votes in matches only twice during the season—the fewest by any Brownlow Medal winner.

== Leading vote-getters ==
	Player	Votes
=1st	Nathan Buckley (Collingwood)	22
=1st	Adam Goodes (Sydney)	22
=1st	Mark Ricciuto (Adelaide)	22
=4th	Ben Cousins (West Coast)	21
=4th	Shane Crawford (Hawthorn)	21
=4th	Gavin Wanganeen (Port Adelaide)	21
=7th	Peter Bell (Fremantle)	19
=7th	Michael Voss (Brisbane Lions)	19
=7th	James Hird (Essendon)	19
10th	Andrew McLeod (Adelaide)	18

== Voting procedure ==
The three field umpires (those umpires who control the flow of the game, as opposed to goal or boundary umpires) confer after each match and award three votes, two votes, and one vote to the players they regard as the best, second-best and third-best in the match, respectively. The votes are kept secret until the awards night, and they are read and tallied on the evening.

As the medal is awarded to the fairest and best player in the league, those who have been suspended during the season by the AFL Tribunal (or, who avoided suspension only because of a discount for a good record or an early guilty plea) are ineligible to win the award; however, they may still continue to poll votes.
