= Adnyamathanha =

Modern grouping of Aboriginal Australian peoples

Total population
- Unknown (262 speakers in the 2021 Australian census)

Regions with significant populations
- Flinders Ranges

Languages
- Adnyamathanha, English (Australian Aboriginal English, Australian English)

Religion
- Christianity (Uniting Church), traditional beliefs

The Adnyamathanha (Pronounced: /ˈɑːdnjəmʌdənə/) are a contemporarily formed grouping of several traditionally distinct Aboriginal Australian peoples of the northern Flinders Ranges, South Australia. The ethnonym Adnyamathanha was an alternative name for the Wailpi but the contemporary grouping also includes the Guyani, Jadliaura, Pilatapa, and sometimes the Barngarla peoples. The origin of the name is in the words "adnya" ("rock") and "matha" ("group" or "group of people"). Adnyamathanha is also used to refer to their traditional language, although Adnyamathanha people themselves call their language "yura ngarwala" (roughly translated as "our speech") and refer to themselves as "yura".

== Country ==
There are conflicting claims as to the traditional countries of the various Adnyamathanha peoples. According to David Horton's map "Aboriginal Australia" (largely based on that of Norman Tindale), the Adnyamathanha lands lie on the west banks of Lake Frome and extend south and west over the northern Ikara–Flinders Ranges National Park and northwards over the Vulkathunha-Gammon Ranges National Park. One Adnyamathanha account describes their lands as "from the Northern Flinders south to Port Augusta and as far east as Broken Hill", while a 2025 article describes it as extending from Arkaroola in the north down to Mount Remarkable in the south. Norman Tindale estimated the ancestral country to cover approximately 3,000 square miles (7,800 km^{2}).

On the northern edges of the Adnyamathanha tribal lands are the Diyari lands, on the western edges are the Kokatha lands. To the south are the Barngarla (also sometimes included in the Adnyamathanya group), Nukunu, and Ngadjuri. To the east are the Malyangapa.

There is a community of various Adnyamathanha people at Nepabunna, just west of the Gammon Ranges, which was established as a mission station in 1931. The Adnyamathanha Traditional Lands Association (ATLA) was formed to represent the interests of the Adnyamathanha people.

Nantawarrina IPA, the first Indigenous Protected Area in Australia, was established in 1998, and has been run by the Adnyamathanha people, with extensive work done by Indigenous rangers to restore the land and protect the native flora and fauna since then.

On 30 March 2009, the Adnyamathanha people were recognised by the Federal Court of Australia as having native title rights over about 41,000 square kilometres (16,000 sq mi) running east from the edge of Lake Torrens, through the northern Flinders Ranges, approaching the South Australian border with New South Wales. It includes the Ikara–Flinders Ranges National Park. In 2016, Ikara–Flinders Ranges National Park was renamed from Flinders Ranges National Park in recognition of its Adnyamathanha heritage. The word ikara means "meeting place" in Adnyamathanha language, and refers in this instance to Wilpena Pound (situated within the park), a traditional meeting place of the Adnyamathanha people.

== People ==
The ethnonym Adnyamathanha was, according to Tindale, an alternative name for the Wailpi, but the contemporarily formed grouping also includes the Guyani (Kuyani), Jadliaura (Yardliyawara/Yadliaura), Pilatapa (Biladappa) and, according to the people themselves, the Pangkala (Barngarla or Vanggarla) peoples.

The name Adnyamathanha means "rock people", with adnya meaning "rock" and matha, a "group" or "group of people", in the Adnyamathanha language, and is a term referring to the Lakes Culture societies living in that area. They share common ancestral bonds of language and culture, they call Yura Muda. Adnyamathanha people often refer to themselves as yura, and non-Aboriginal people as udnyu.

Archaeological evidence such as rock engravings and artefacts suggests that the aboriginal people have inhabited the area for millennia (up to 49,000 years), according to recent finds at the Warratyi rock shelter.

In the 2021 census, 43.1% of Adnyamathanha speakers had no religion, followed by 15.3% for the Uniting Church, 10.7% for non-defined Christian and 4.6% for traditional beliefs.

== Language ==
Adnyamathanha is a member of the Thura-Yura language family and the only one which still has fluent native speakers. There were 262 native speakers recorded in the 2021 Australian census

== Mythology and astronomy ==
Traditional mythology of the origins of the Adnyamathanha is told through creation stories, passed down from generation to generation. The primordial creator figure of the rainbow serpent is, among them, known as akurra.

The Pleiades (Seven Sisters) are known to them as the Makara, seen as a group of marsupial-like women with pouches, while the Magellanic Clouds are known as Vutha Varkla, seen as two male lawmen also known as the Vaalnapa.

Traditionally, the Adnyamathanha bear strong respect for lizards such as geckoes and goannas. This is explained in myth as the cannibal sun goddess Bila having been defeated by the Lizard Men Kudnu and Muda.

4.6% (12 people) of Adnyamathanha speakers reported following traditional beliefs.

== History of contact ==
Pastoralists from the British colonies reached Adnyamathanha lands prior to 1850, beyond colonial control. The first colonial pastoral leases for colonists to settle some of the area were granted in 1851, by the colonial government. One 2009 account claimed there were many conflicts because Adnyamathanha people were pushed off their land by the Europeans and, in response to the loss of their land, food and water, Aboriginal people stole sheep, which in turn led to retaliatory killings. However, there are records that Adnyamathanha people soon became stockmen, station hands and homestead housekeepers, not only adopting but becominng essential participants in the new land uses and economy. The new ways provided improved standards of living and, often, benefits were repatriated to other family members in rations and other items. There are records of Adnyamathanha adopting western dress and ways by the 1900s.

Some Adnyamathanha people retained links to their language and culture and would return and gather at the campsite and ration depot at Mount Serle Station (Atuwarapanha), a significant cultural site to speak in their languages and pass on their lore. After rations stopped, some relocated to Ram Paddock Gate (Minerawuta) during the 1920s. Some moved to settlements and towns and, over time, connections with many of those on stations weakened. In 1931, the remote Nepabunna Mission was established by the United Aborigines Mission and most of the remaining residents of Ram Paddock moved there. Some Nepabunna Mission residents worked at R. M. Williams's workshop nearby, where Williams developed his trademark boots and horse-riding equipment, helping to build his business in the first two years of its existence. Otherwise, the isolation of Nepabunna created disconnection from participation in the economy and segregation. In 2011, on the 80th anniversary of the establishment of Nepabunna, there were only a few people alive who had been born when it was a mission, the eldest being Ronald Coulthard, then aged 80.

=== Anthropological studies ===
In May 1937, ninety years and generations after traditional lifestyles had been disturbed, a University of Adelaide anthropological expedition travelled to Nepabunna. It was led by J.B. Cleland and including Charles P. Mountford as ethnologist and photographer, botanist Thomas Harvey Johnston, virologist Frank Fenner and others. Mountford was especially interested in the Adnyamathanha people's art, mythology and rituals. He came back later in the year and many times thereafter, recording Adnyamathanha language and culture. The Mountford-Sheard Collection in the State Library of South Australia (inscribed in UNESCO's Memory of the World programme in 2008) has a large collection of handwritten journals, photographs, sound and film recordings gathered by him from and about the people.

==== Exhibition ====
An exhibition entitled "Unsettled: colonial ruin in the Flinders Ranges", described as "a critical examination of settler-colonial nostalgia in the Flinders Ranges, within an artistic context", was mounted by the State Library of South Australia in partnership with the Adnyamathanha Traditional Lands Association in March–May 2017. It included many photographs taken by Mountford on the 1937 and subsequent trips to the Flinders. The photos were complemented by story-telling by descendants of the people represented, including Terrence Coulthard (see Notable people, below).

== Coulthard flag ==
Flag designed by Vince Coulthard in 2011

Children at Nepabunna School were encouraged to design flags and chose the colours blue (representing the ngiiarri, or sky) and brown (symbolising the yarta, or land). Gordon Coulthard made the designs into a single flag, to which he added the word "Adnyamathanha". In 2011, Vince Coulthard, chair of the Adnyamathanha Traditional Lands Association (ATLA) and representative of Iga Warta, in consultation with other community members and with the help of his daughter and Uncle Gordon, used the same colours but redesigned the flag. His flag includes the star constellations of the Seven Sisters or Pleiades (Artinyi), to include the women's stories, and the Saucepan (Mirarrityi), to represent the men's stories. The sun is a common Adnyamathanha symbol that represents the coming together of the all Yura (Adnyamathanha people). In November 2011, the flag was raised at Nepabunna on the 80th anniversary of its establishment. The flag was adopted by the Adnyamathanha Traditional Lands Association (ATLA). The use of flags has been rejected by some as non-traditional and uptake of colonial culture ways.

== Notable people ==
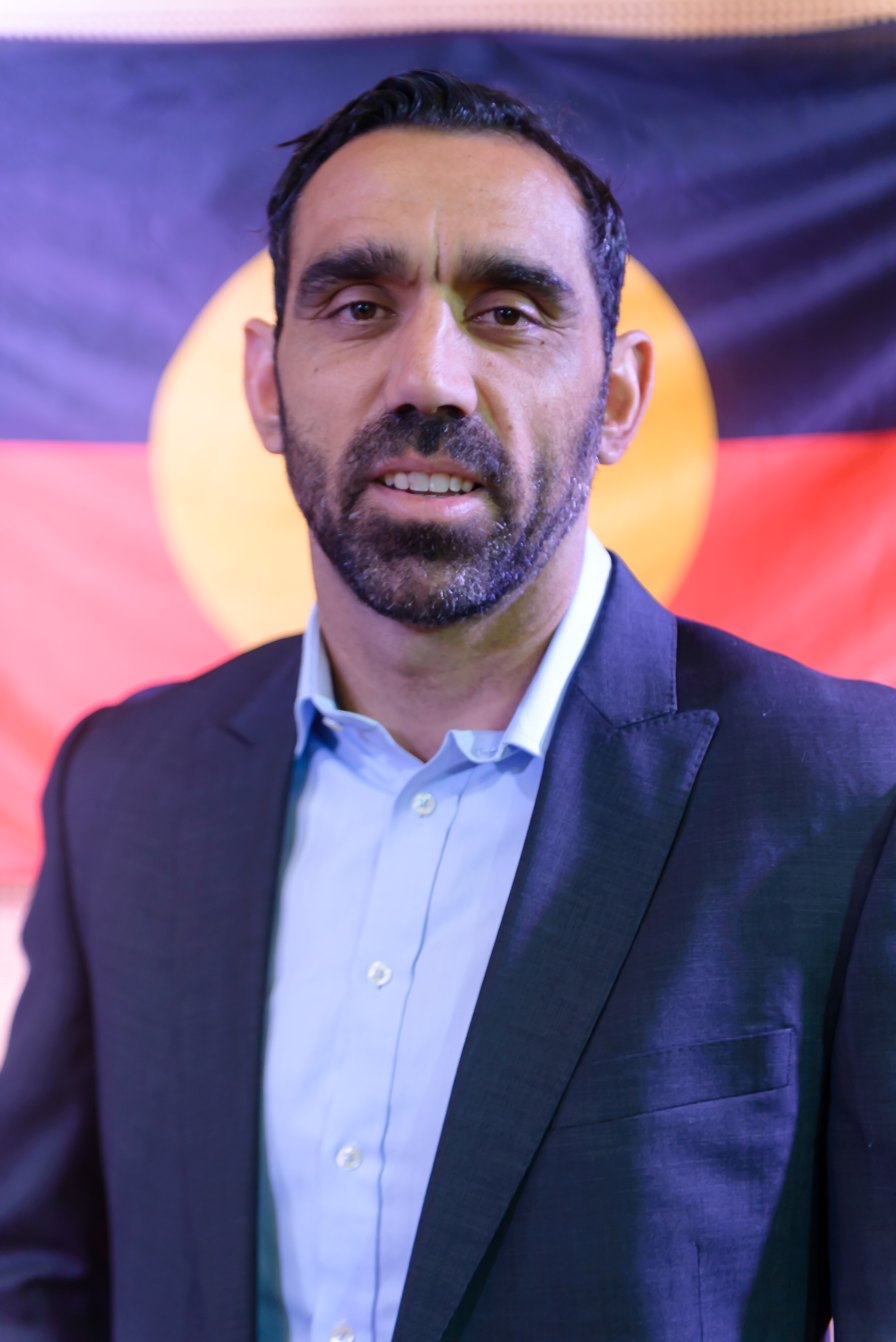
Adam Goodes

- Adam Goodes, four-time All-Australian AFL footballer, stated he is an Adnyamathanha and Narungga man.
- Rebecca Richards, the first Aboriginal Rhodes Scholar, is an Adnyamathanha and Barngarla woman.
- Regina McKenzie is an artist who, in 2006, had two pieces acquired by the National Museum of Australia of Adnyamathanha Dreaming Storylines and who, in 2016, was awarded the Peter Rawlinson award for her outstanding contribution to protection of country by the Australian Conservation Foundation.
- Juanella McKenzie, artist and daughter of Regina McKenzie, had two works (containing similar storylines subject matter) acquired by the National Museum of Australia in 2008, and in early 2019 at the age of 29, Juanella was acquired into the National Museum of Scotland with a bark painting she did using traditional methods depicting women's business. She won an Achievement award from TAFE NSW in 2019, a category of the Gili (pronounced kill-ee) Awards which celebrate the achievements of Aboriginal students, as well as the accomplishments of TAFE NSW employees and innovative programs that have empowered Aboriginal and Torres Strait Islander communities. She won Country Arts SA's 2020 Breaking Ground visual arts development award, and her work Yurndu (Sun) which uses the traditional technique of weaving emu feathers, was selected as a finalist for the Ramsay Art Prize at the Art Gallery of South Australia in 2021.
- Terrence and Josephine Coulthard, authors of the first Adnyamathanha/English bilingual dictionary, published in November 2020. The family runs the Iga Warta cultural tourism enterprise, near Nepabunna.
- Faith Thomas AM (née Coulthard; 1933 – 15 April 2023), cricketer, hockey player, nurse; the first Indigenous woman to represent Australia in any sport

== See also ==
- List of Indigenous Australian group names
- Nepabunna, South Australia
- Adnyamathanha language
