= Kuyani =

Aboriginal people of South Australia

The Kuyani people, also written Guyani and other variants, and also known as the Nganitjidi, are an Aboriginal Australian people of the state of South Australia who speak the Kuyani language. Their traditional lands are to the west of the Flinders Ranges.

== Country ==
According to the estimation made by Norman Tindale, the Kuyani held sway over some 13,200 square miles (34,000 km^{2}) of tribal land, extending northwards from Parachilna to the western flank of the Flinders Ranges at Marree. Their northeastern boundary was at Murnpeowie. Their western frontier lay at Turret Range and Andamooka. They also occupied the area to the north of, but not including, Lake Torrens. However, Lake Torrens was of great significance to the Kuyani people. Warta Kuyani is situated in the Roxby Downs, Andamooka area

The Kuyani around Beltana and Leigh Creek were known as the Adjnjakujani from a word, adnya meaning "Rock," while those near Lake Torrens were called plainspeople (Wartakujani.)

Their neighbours to the east are the Adnyamathanha people, whose language is closely related.

== Alternative names ==
- Kujani, Kuyanni
- Kwiani, Kwiana
- Kooyiannie
- Gujani
- Owinia
- Cooyiannie
- Kooyeeunna, Kooteeunna
- Nganitjidi (Barngarla exonym, meaning "those who sneak and kill by night")
- Ngannityiddi

== Language ==
The Kuyani language is extinct today, with no speakers recorded since 1975.

=== Some words ===
- wilker (dog, both tame and wild)
- papi (father)
- comie/knumie (mother)
- coodnoo (white man)

== Sources ==
- "Aboriginal South Australia". Government of South Australia. Archived from the original on 1 May 2013.
- "AIATSIS map of Indigenous Australia". AIATSIS.
- Elkin, A. P. (September 1931). "The Social Organization of South Australian Tribes". Oceania. 2 (1): 44–73. doi:10.1002/j.1834-4461.1931.tb00022.x. JSTOR 40327353.
- Eylmann, Erhard (1908). Die Eingeborenen der Kolonie Südaustralien (PDF). Berlin: D.Reimer.
- Hale, H. M.; Tindale, Norman (1925). "Observations on aborigines of the Flinders Ranges and records of rock carvings and paintings". Records of the South Australian Museum. 3 (1). Adelaide: 45–60.
- Helms, Richard (1896). "Anthropology of the Elder Exploring Expedition. 1871-1872". Transactions of the Royal Society of South Australia. 16. Adelaide: 237–332.
- Horne, G. A.; Aiston, G. (1924). Savage life in Central Australia (PDF). London: Macmillan.
- Howitt, Alfred William (1904). The native tribes of south-east Australia (PDF). Macmillan.
- Howitt, Alfred William; Siebert, Otto (January–June 1904). "Legends of the Dieri and Kindred Tribes of Central Australia". The Journal of the Anthropological Institute of Great Britain and Ireland. 34: 100–129. doi:10.2307/2843089. JSTOR 2843089.
- Jessop, William Rowlestone Henry (1962). Flindersland and Sturtland; or, the Inside and Outside of Australia (PDF). London: Richard Bentley.
- Kingsmill, J. W. (1886). "Beltana" (PDF). In Curr, Edward Micklethwaite (ed.). The Australian race: its origin, languages, customs, place of landing in Australia and the routes by which it spread itself over the continent. Vol. 2. Melbourne: J. Ferres. pp. 118–121.
- Mathews, R. H. (January 1900a). "Divisions of the South Australian Aborigines". Proceedings of the American Philosophical Society. 39 (161): 78–91+93. JSTOR 983545.
- Mathews, R. H. (October–December 1900b). "Phallic Rites and Initiation Ceremonies of the South Australian Aborigines". Proceedings of the American Philosophical Society. 39 (164): 622–638. JSTOR 983778.
- Schürmann, Clamor Wilhelm (1879). "The Aboriginal Tribes of Port Lincoln" (PDF). In Woods, James Dominick (ed.). The Native Tribes of South Australia. Adelaide: E.S. Wigg & Son. pp. 207–252.
- Strehlow, Carl (1910). Die Aranda- und Loritja-stämme in Zentral-Australien (PDF) (in German). Vol. 3. Frankfurt am Main: Städtisches Völker-Museum.
- Tindale, Norman Barnett (1974). "Kujani(SA)". Aboriginal Tribes of Australia: Their Terrain, Environmental Controls, Distribution, Limits, and Proper Names. Australian National University Press. ISBN 978-0-708-10741-6.
- Wilhelmi, Charles (1860). "Manners and customs of the Australian natives, in particular of the Port Lincoln district". Transactions of the Royal Society of Victoria. 5: 164–203. ISBN 978-0-708-10741-6.
