= Adnyamathanha language =

Australian Aboriginal language

Adnyamathanha-Kuyani
- yura ngarwala
- Native to: Australia
- Region: South Australia
- Ethnicity: Adnyamathanha, Kuyani, Wailpi
- Native speakers: 262 (2021 census, Adnyamathanha)
- Language family: Pama–Nyungan: Thura-Yura; Yura; Adnyamathanha-Kuyani
- Writing system: Latin script

Language codes
- ISO 639-3: Either: adt – Adnyamathanha gvy – Guyani
- Glottolog: adny1235 Adnyamathanha guya1249 Guyani
- AIATSIS: L10 Adnyamathanha, L9 Kuyani
- ELP: Adnyamathanha
- Kuyani
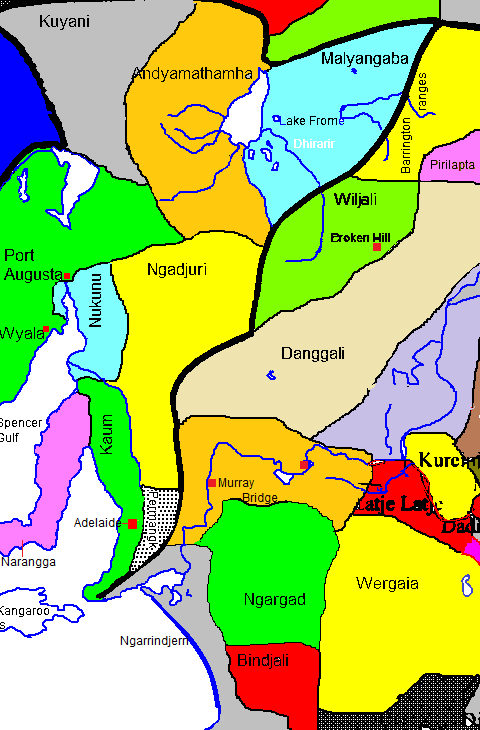
- Traditional lands of Aboriginal peoples near Adelaide

- Adnyamathanha is classified as Definitely Endangered by the UNESCO Atlas of the World's Languages in Danger.

The Adnyamathanha language (pronounced /ˈɑːdnjəmʌdənə/), also known as yura ngarwala natively and Kuyani, also known as Guyani and other variants, are two closely related Australian Aboriginal languages. They are traditional languages of the Adnyamathanha of and the Kuyani peoples, of the Flinders Ranges and to the west of the Flinders respectively, in South Australia.

As of the 2021 Australian census, there were around 262 speakers of Adnyamathanha, up from 140 in 2016, making it an endangered language; there have been no speakers of Kuyani recorded since 1975. The first bilingual dictionary of the language was published in November 2020.

The name of the witchetty grub comes from Adnyamathanha.

== Names ==
This language has been known by many names and variant spellings of names, including:

- Adnyamathanha, Adynyamathanha, Adjnjamathanha, Atʸnʸamat̪an̪a, Adnjamathanha, Adnyamathana, Anyamathana, Ad'n'amadana, Anjimatana, Anjiwatana, Unyamootha
- Wailpi, Wailbi, Waljbi, Wipie, the name of a dialect
- Archualda
- Benbakanjamata
- Binbarnja
- Gadjnjamada, Kanjimata, Keydnjmarda
- Jandali
- Mardala
- Nimalda
- Nuralda
- Umbertana
- Yura ngarwala

Yura ngarwala is a widely used term for the Adnyamathanha language. It translates literally to 'people speak'. However, in modern times yura has come to mean 'Adnyamathanha person', rather than 'person' generally, and thus the term translates to 'Adnyamathanha person speak'.

Guyani is also spelled Kijani, Kuyani, Kwiani.

== Classification ==
While R. M. W. Dixon classifies Adnyamathanha and Guyani as a single language, Ethnologue, Glottolog and AIATSIS treats them as separate languages, L10: Adnyamathanha and L9: Kuyani.

== Speakers ==
Estimates of the number of people who speak Adnyamathanha are variable, though it is a severely endangered language. According to Oates (1973) there were only 30 speakers, around 20 according to Schmidt in 1990, 127 in the 1996 Australian census, 140 in the 2016 census and 262 in 2021.

== Phonology ==
Adjnjamathanha and Guyani have the same phonemic inventory.

=== Vowels ===
	Front	Back
High	i iː	u uː
Low	a aː	

=== Consonants ===
Most of the nasals and laterals are allophonically prestopped.

		Peripheral		Laminal		Apical		
		Labial	Velar	Palatal	Dental	Alveolar	Retroflex	Glottal
Plosive	voiceless	p	k	c	t̪	t	ʈ	(ʔ)
Plosive	voiced						(ɖ)	
Fricative	voiced	(v)						
Nasal		m ~ bm	ŋ	ɲ ~ ɟɲ	n̪ ~ d̪n̪	n ~ dn	ɳ ~ ɖɳ	
Lateral				ʎ ~ ɟʎ	l̪ ~ d̪l̪	l ~ dl	ɭ ~ ɖɭ	
Flap						ɾ	ɽ	
Trill						r		
Approximant		w		j			ɻ	

[v] may be an allophone of /p/.

=== History ===
While the closely related Guyani retains word-initial stops, Adnyamathanha has undergone systematic lenition of stops in this position. Former *p has become [v], former *t̪ and probably also *c have become /j/, and former *k has disappeared entirely.

== Grammar ==
Adnyamathanha has a complex system of personal pronouns. There are 10 different ways of saying we "you and I" (first person dual), depending on the relationship between the speaker and the addressee.

== First dictionary (2020) ==
The linguist Bernhard Schebeck travelled to the Nepabunna region in the 1970s, and wrote An Adnyamathanha-English Research Dictionary in 2000, which was "For private, or internal, use only – not for publication". Dorothy Tunbridge, a linguist from Canberra and author of Flinders Ranges Dreaming visited the area in the 1980s. Both contributed much to knowledge of the language, but neither recorded all of the words that were known to local speakers.

In November 2020 the first-ever bilingual Adnyamathanha/English dictionary and grammar was published, with translations from and to each language. Compiled by Terrence Coulthard and his wife Josephine, the 400-page Adnyamathanha Culture Guide and Language Book includes descriptions of cultural practices, songlines (muda), the Adnyamathanha kinship system and social history. Terrence, an Adnyamathanha speaker, had been collecting information on the culture and language for 40 years, building on the earlier work by Schebeck and Tunbridge. Linguists and others from the University of Adelaide's Mobile Language Team helped the couple to finalise work on the book in the 18 months to two years before publication.

The Coulthards run Iga Warta, a cultural tourism enterprise, located near Nepabunna in the Gammon Ranges, the site of a mission where Terrence grew up. Iga Warta means "native orange", named by 19th-century English botanist John Lindley as Capparis mitchellii.

== Words ==
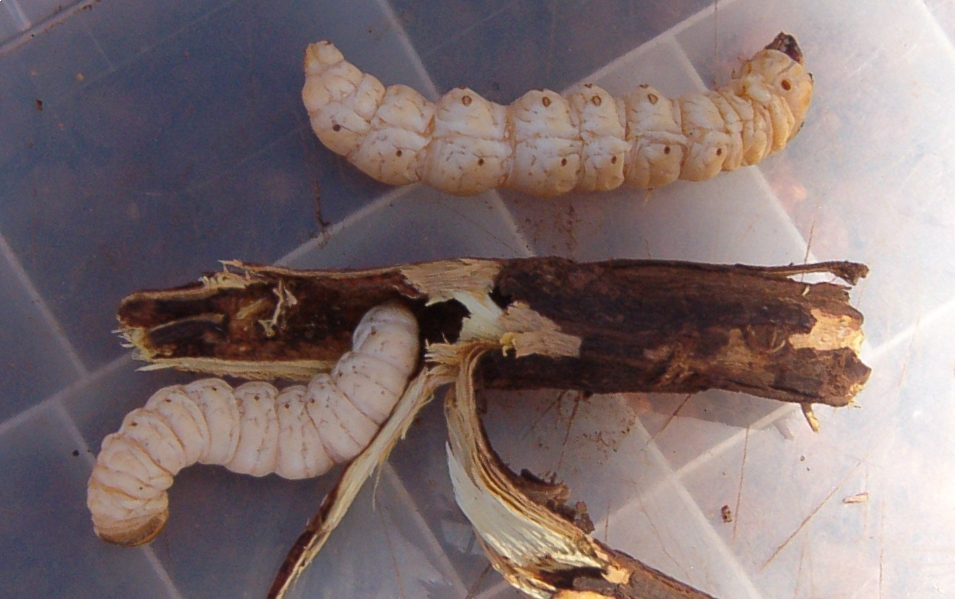
A couple of witchetty grubs

- "Witchetty grub": The word witchetty comes from the Adynyamathanha word witjuri, from wityu, meaning 'hooked stick' and vartu, meaning 'grub'. Traditionally it is rare for men to dig for them. Witchetty grubs feature as Dreamings in many Aboriginal paintings.
- muda – songline
