= Board for Anthropological Research =

The Board for Anthropological Research sponsored over forty anthropological expeditions to study Australian Aboriginal people in the five decades following its establishment in 1926.

Although the work of the Board was focussed on physical anthropology, the expeditions also resulted in research across a range of fields, such as linguistics and botany, and also broader aspects of anthropology, including the documentation of social organisation, tribal/language boundaries and songs and ceremony.

The records of the Board for Anthropological Research, (and related collections held in the South Australian Museum Archives), contain detailed information in a range of formats about many Australian Aboriginal groups and individuals. The collection comprises: minutes; drafts and proofs of publications; papers related to expeditions; data cards; genealogies; photographic prints and negatives; crayon drawings; and film.

The Board was formed by Draper Campbell, (Sir) John Cleland, Henry Fry Frederic Wood Jones, Robert Pulleine, and Archibald Watson.

Numerous South Australian Museum employees and presidents of the Royal Society of South Australia have been members of the Board, including:

- A.A. Abbie
- T.D. Campbell
- J.B. Cleland
- F.J. Fenner
- H.K. Fry
- C.J. Hackett
- H.M. Hale
- Thomas Harvey Johnston
- F. Wood Jones
- R.H. Pulleine
- T.G. Strehlow
- N.B. Tindale
- A. Watson
