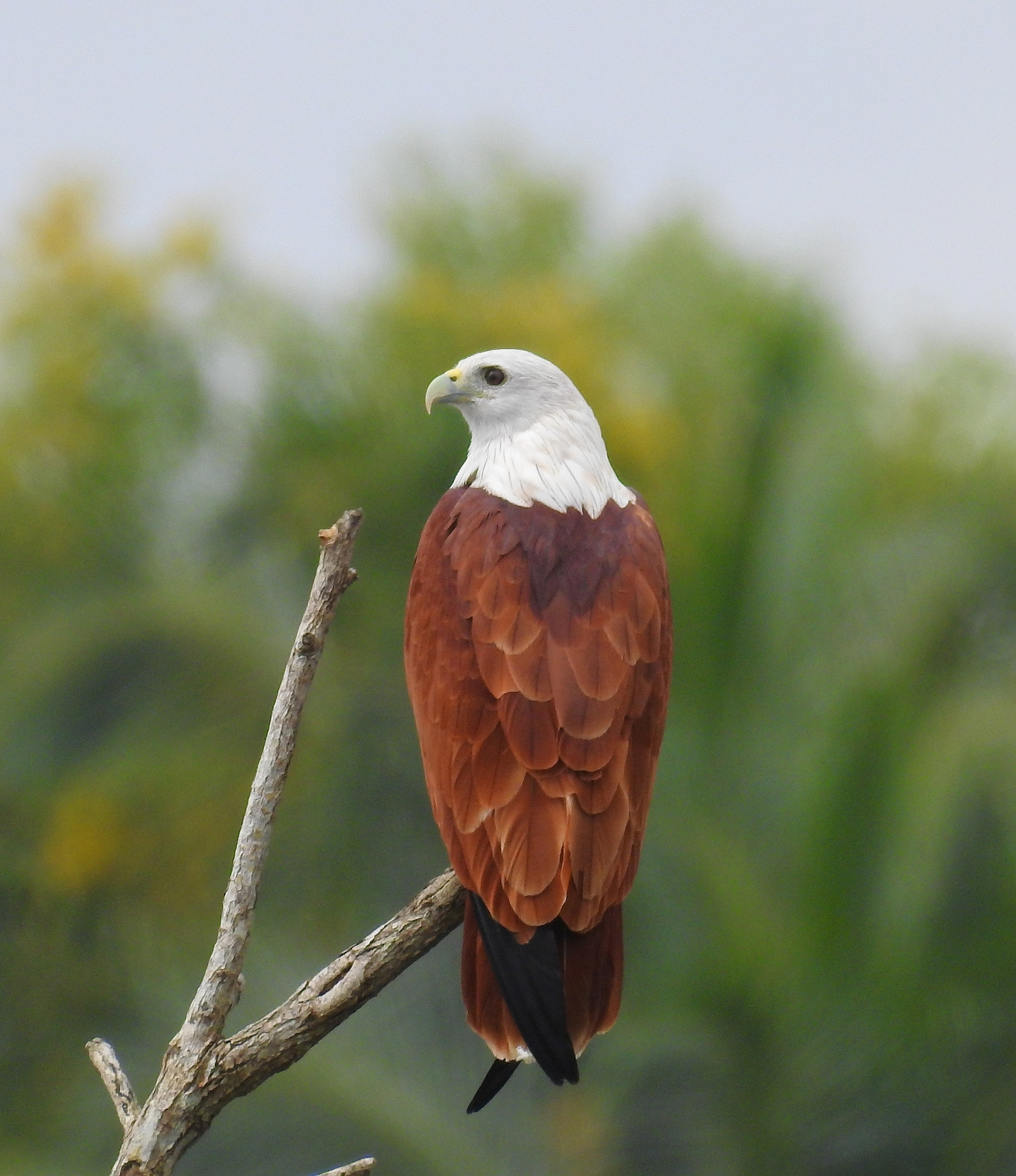
- Kerala, India
- Juvenile in Sundarbans National Park, West Bengal, India.

Conservation status
- Least Concern (IUCN 3.1)

Scientific classification
- Kingdom: Animalia
- Phylum: Chordata
- Class: Aves
- Order: Accipitriformes
- Family: Accipitridae
- Genus: Haliastur
- Species: H. indus

Binomial name
- Haliastur indus (Boddaert, 1783)

= Brahminy kite =

Species of bird

The brahminy kite (Haliastur indus), also known as the red-backed sea-eagle, is a medium-sized bird of prey in the family Accipitridae, which also includes many other diurnal raptors, such as eagles, buzzards, and harriers, found in the Indian subcontinent, Southeast Asia, and Australia. The brahminy kite is found mainly on the coast and in inland wetlands, where it feeds on dead fish and other prey. Adults have a reddish-brown body plumage contrasting with their white head and breast which make them easy to distinguish from other birds of prey.

== Taxonomy ==
In 1760, French zoologist Mathurin Jacques Brisson described and illustrated the Brahminy kite in the first volume of his Oiseaux based on a specimen collected in Pondicherry, India. He used the French name L'aigle de Pondichery. The brahminy kite was included by the French polymath Georges-Louis Leclerc, Comte de Buffon in his Histoire Naturelle des Oiseaux. It was also illustrated in a hand-coloured plate engraved by François-Nicolas Martinet in the Planches Enluminées D'Histoire Naturelle which was produced under the supervision of Edme-Louis Daubenton to accompany Buffon's text. Neither Brisson nor Buffon included a scientific name but in 1783 the Dutch naturalist Pieter Boddaert coined the binomial name Falco indus in his catalogue of the Planches Enluminées. The brahminy kite is now placed with the whistling kite in the genus Haliastur that was erected by the English naturalist Prideaux John Selby in 1840.

Four subspecies are recognized:

Image	Subspecies	Distribution
	Haliastur indus indus (Boddaert, 1783)	South Asia
	Haliastur indus intermedius Blyth, 1865	Malay Peninsula, Greater and Lesser Sunda Islands, Sulawesi and the Philippines
	Haliastur indus girrenera (Vieillot, 1822)	New Guinea, Bismarck Archipelago and north Australia
	Haliastur indus flavirostris Condon & Amadon, 1954	Solomon Islands

== Description ==
The bird measures 45–51 cm (18–20 in) in length, 109–124 cm (43–49 in) in wingspan, and weighs 320–673 g (11.3–23.7 oz).

The brahminy kite is distinctive and contrastingly coloured, with chestnut plumage except for the white head and breast and black wing tips. The juveniles are browner, but can be distinguished from both the resident and migratory races of black kites in Asia by the paler appearance, shorter wings, and rounded tail. The pale patch on the underwing carpal region is of a squarish shape and separated from Buteo buzzards. The brahminy kite is about the same size as the black kite (Milvus migrans) and has a typical kite flight, with wings angled, but its tail is rounded unlike the Milvus species, red kite, and black kite, which have forked tails. The two genera are, however, very close.

The call is a mewing keeyew.

== Distribution and status ==
This kite is a familiar sight in the skies of Sri Lanka, Nepal, India, Iran, Pakistan, Bangladesh, and southeast Asia and as far south as New South Wales, Australia, through which region it is widespread and resident. They perform seasonal movements associated with rainfall in some parts of their range.

They are mainly seen in the plains, but can sometimes occur above 5000 feet in the Himalayas.

It is evaluated as being of least concern on the IUCN Red List of Threatened Species. However, the species is on the decline in some parts such as Java.

== Behaviour ==
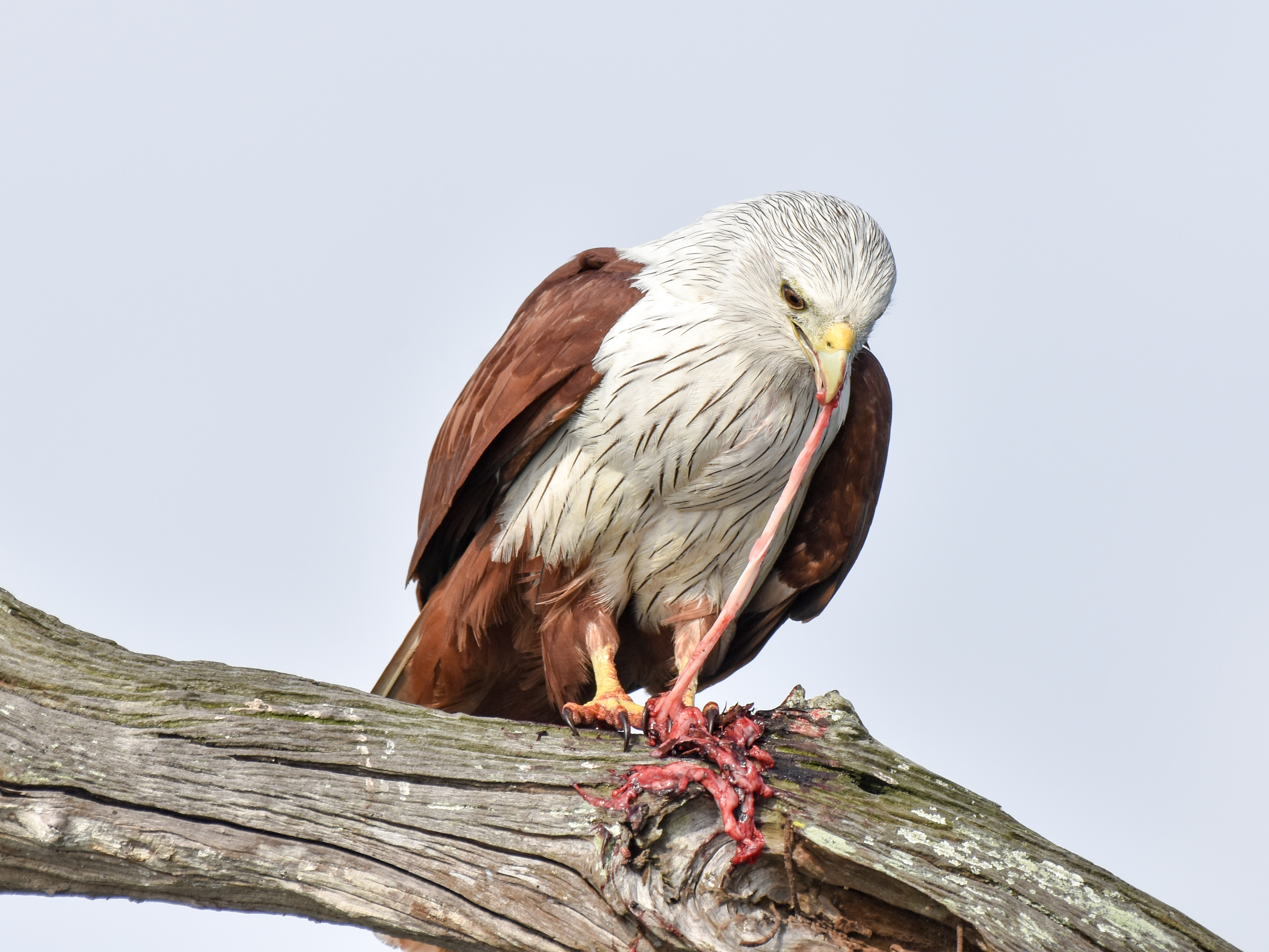
Brahminy kite eating, Kabini Reservoir, India

The breeding season in South Asia is from December to April. In southern and eastern Australia, it is August to October, and April to June in the north and west. The nests are constructed of small branches and sticks with a bowl inside and lined with leaves, and are located in various trees, often mangroves. They show considerable site fidelity nesting in the same area year after year. In some rare instances, they have been seen to nest on the ground under trees. A clutch of two dull-white or bluish-white oval eggs measuring 52 x 41 mm is laid. Both parents take part in nest building and feeding, but likely only the female incubates. The incubation period is about 26 to 27 days.

It is primarily a scavenger, feeding mainly on dead fish and crabs, especially in wetlands and marshland, but occasionally hunts live prey such as hares and bats. They may also indulge in kleptoparasitism and attempt to steal prey from other birds. Brahminy kites have even been recorded taking advantage of Irrawaddy dolphins herding fish to the surface, in the Mekong River. A rare instance of a bird feeding on honey at the hive of Apis florea has been recorded. It also eats rice or cooked food left as an offering in India.

Young birds may indulge in play behaviour, dropping leaves and attempting to catch them in the air. When fishing over water, they may sometimes land in the water, but manage to swim and take off without much trouble.

They roost communally on large and isolated trees and as many as 600 have been seen at one location.

They may mob larger raptors such as the Aquila eagles. In some incidents where brahminy kites mobbed steppe eagles (Aquila rapax), they were attacked and injured or killed.

A number of ectoparasitic bird lice in the genera Kurodaia, Colpocephalum, and Degeeriella have been reported.

== In culture ==
Known as elang bondol in Indonesia, the brahminy kite is the official mascot of Jakarta. In Hinduism, it is considered as the contemporary representation of Garuda, the sacred bird of Vishnu.

In Malaysia, the island of Langkawi off the northeast coast of the peninsula is named after the bird (kawi denoting an ochre-like stone used to decorate pottery, and a reference to the bird's primary plumage colour). For the Ibans of the Upper Rajang, Sarawak, Malaysia, a brahminy kite is believed to be the manifestation of Singalang Burung when he comes down to earth. Singalang Burung is the ultimate deity of incomparable qualities and superior abilities in every dimension. He is also known as the god of war.

A fable from central Bougainville Island relates how a mother left her baby under a banana tree while gardening, and the baby floated into the sky crying and transformed into Kaa'nang, the brahminy kite, its necklace becoming the bird's feathers.

== Gallery ==
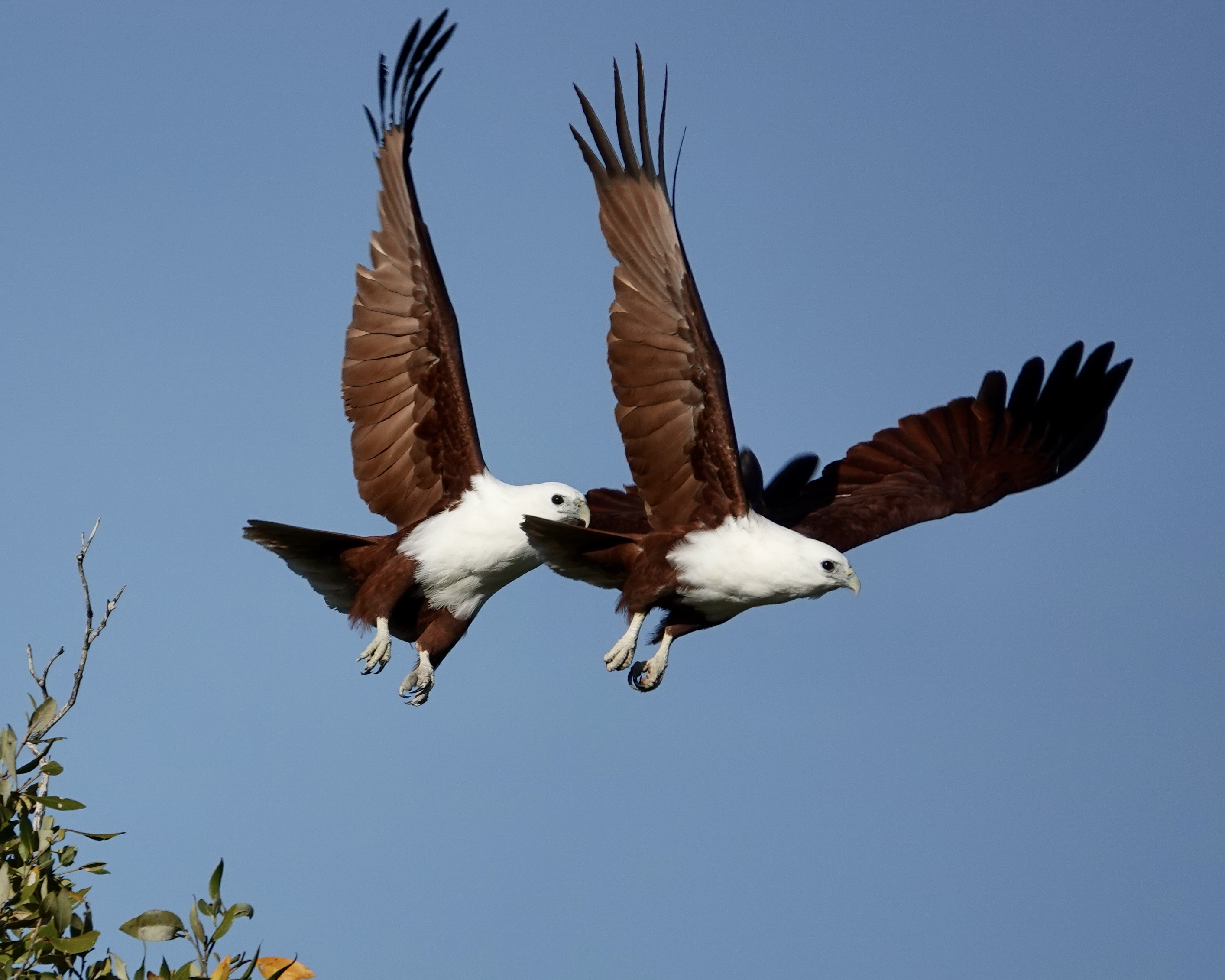
Brahminy kites in flight

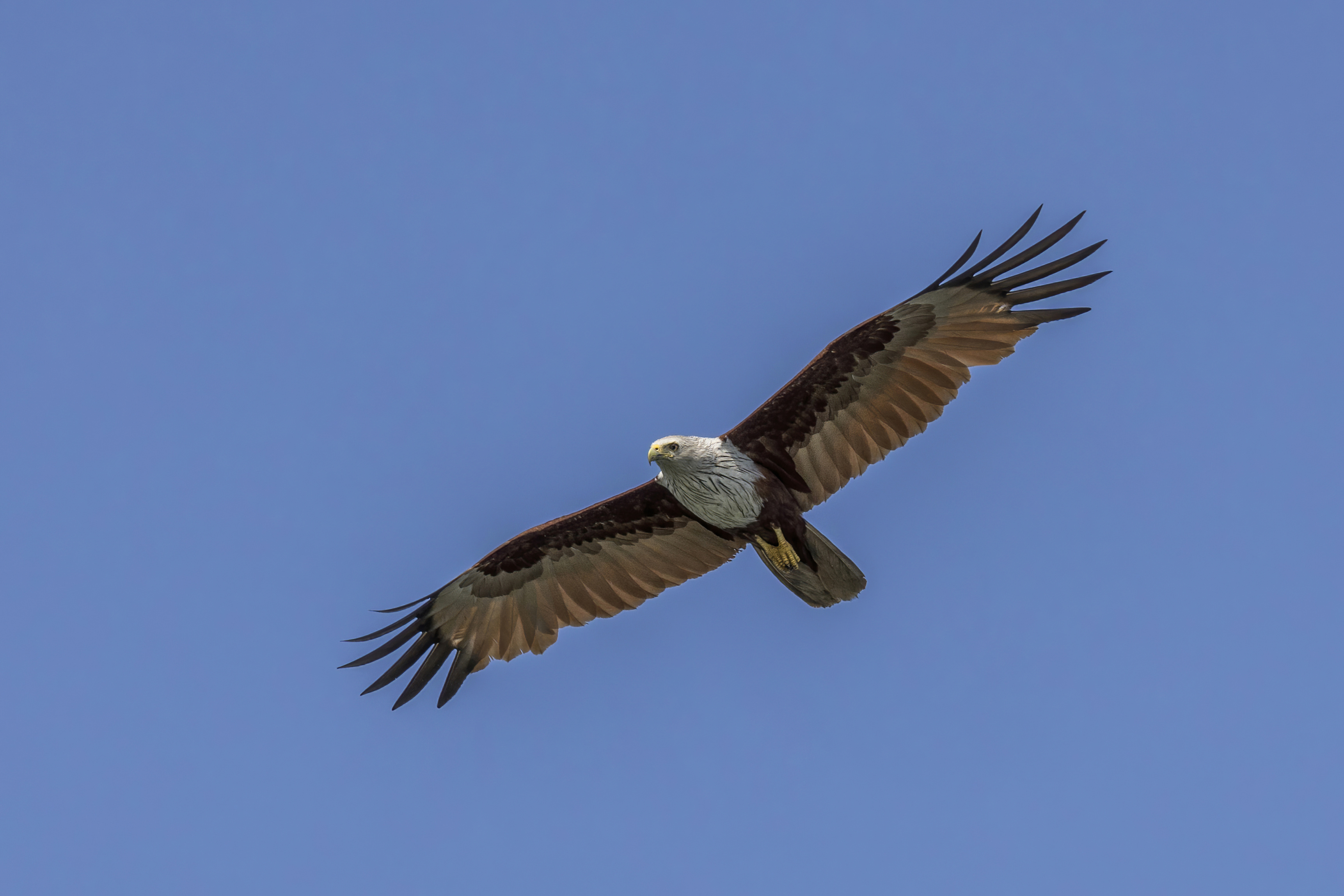
Haliastur indus intermedius in flight, Phang Nga, Thailand

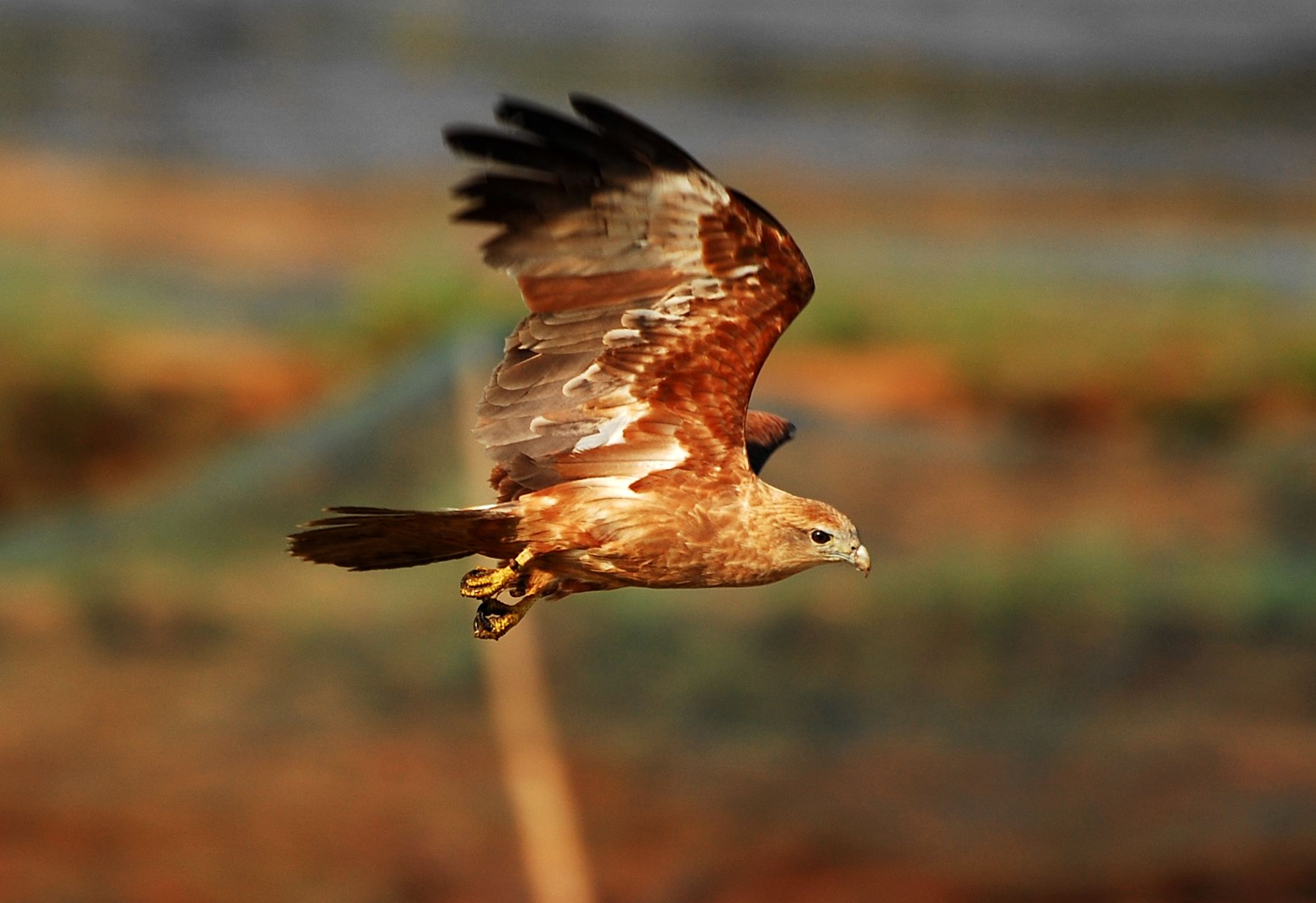
A subadult, Kerala, India

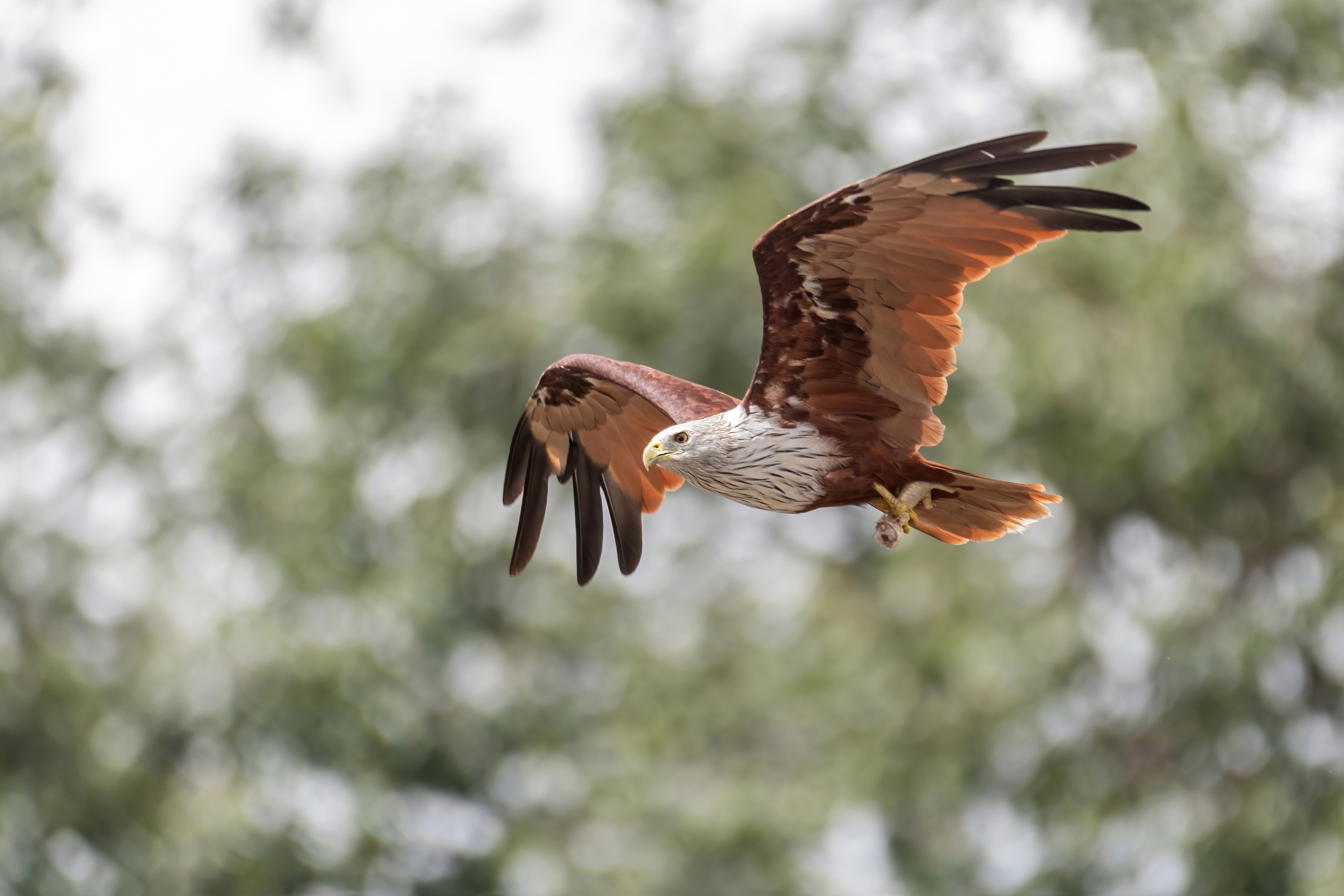
Haliastur indus indus in flight at Kathmandu Valley, Nepal.
