= Henry Fry (anthropologist) =

Australian anthropologist (born 1886)

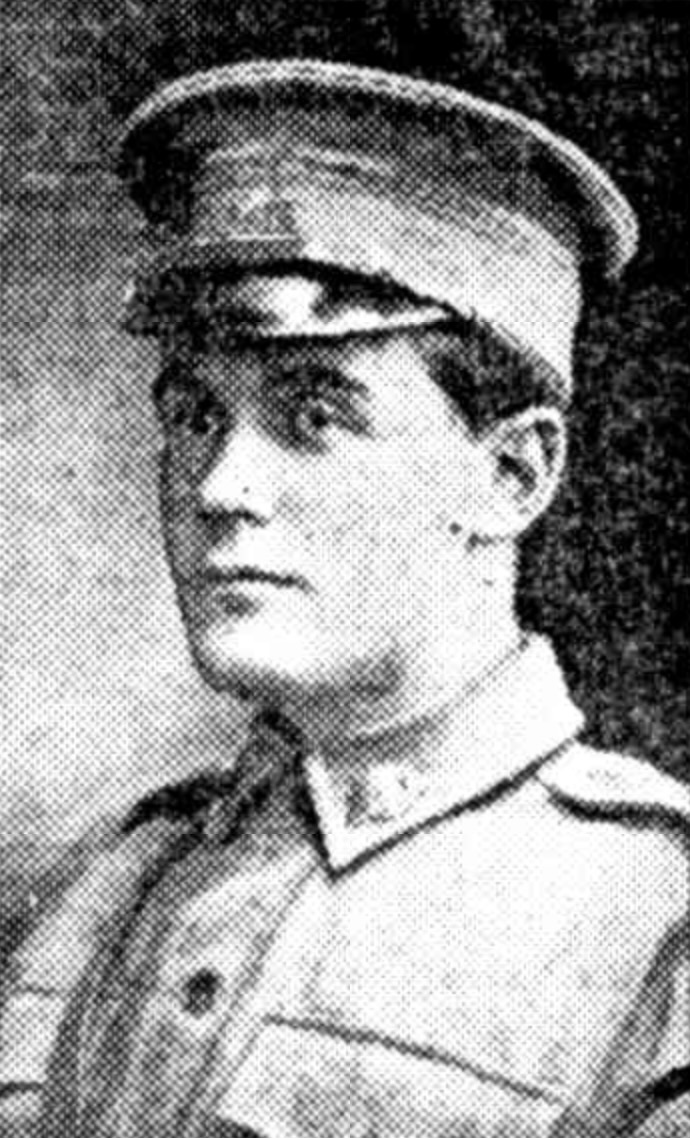
Major Henry Kenneth Fry DSO in 1917

Henry Kenneth Fry DSO (born 25 May 1886 North Adelaide, South Australia) was an Australian physician and anthropologist, and Medical Officer for the City of Adelaide.

== Education ==
Fry attended University of Adelaide and received his BSc 1905, MBBS 1908, MD 1934.

Fry was a 1909 Rhodes Scholar (Balliol) Obtained another BSc, and diplomas in public health and anthropology, in 1912.

== Career ==
In 1913, Fry succeeded Herbert Basedow as chief medical inspector of Aborigines, based in Darwin.

=== World War I ===
At the outbreak of World War I in 1914, Fry was appointed captain in the Australian Army Medical Corps, Australian Imperial Force, and served in Gallipoli. In France in 1916, he became deputy assistant director of medical services (D.A.D.M.S.), 2nd Division, and was awarded the Distinguished Service Order for supervising the evacuation of the wounded while under constant shell-fire at Pozières and Sausage Valley in July–August of that year. He was promoted to lieutenant colonel in 1917, and given command of the 13th Field Ambulance.

=== Post-war career ===
Fry returned to Australia in 1918, where he married Dorothy Editha Deeley with Anglican rites at the Church of the Epiphany, Crafers on 21 October 1918. However, by January 1919 he was back in France as temporary colonel and A.D.M.S., 5th Division. His A.I.F. appointment terminated on 26 December. He was thrice mentioned in dispatches.

In 1920, Fry established a private practice in Eastwood in a house of his own design which incorporated a surgery, laboratory and one of the first X-ray units in the State. He began lecturing in materia medica and therapeutics in the neurology department at the university. He was also an honorary physician at the Royal Adelaide Hospital and an official visitor to Parkside Mental Hospital. In 1923 he joined the Royal Society of South Australia (of which he would later serve as president in 1939).

In 1926, Fry was a founder member of the Board for Anthropological Research, along with Draper Campbell, (Sir) John Cleland, Frederic Wood Jones, Robert Henry Pulleine, and Archibald Watson. His anthropological work took him on numerous medical, ethnological, and anthropological research expeditions to Aboriginal lands in Central Australia between 1929 and 1937. Beginning in 1930 he published over twenty scientific papers on Aboriginal kinship, psychology and mythology.

Moving to Crafers in 1937, Fry was appoint public health officer for the City of Adelaide, a position he occupied part-time. In 1939, as well as acting as President of the Royal Society of South Australia, he was a founding fellow of the Royal Australasian College of Physicians.

Fry died on 22 July 1959 in Stirling.

== Documents ==
South Australian Museum Archives contain:

- Manuscript and typescript papers on kinship, education and other aspects of Aboriginal cultures and on the peoples of Melville and Bathurst Islands;
- notebooks and logs kept on various expeditions with notebooks for psychological tests;
- correspondence 1933-57 and with Ursula McConnel on the social organisation of Aboriginal cultures 1950–52;
- bibliography of papers on anthropology by South Australian research workers 1927–38;
- transcription from the original of 'A Short History of New Australia' by H.K. Fry;
- miscellaneous paintings, extracts, maps and
- a notebook dated 1875 kept by Dr. Lumbers.

== See also ==
- Jones, Philip, 'Fry, Henry Kenneth (1896–1959), Anthropologist and Medical Practitioner', in John Ritchie (ed.), Australian Dictionary of Biography, vol. 14, Melbourne University Press, Melbourne, 1996, pp. 230–231.
- The H.K. Fry Memorial Prize for Psychological Medicine
- 1908 photo of Fry on graduation with MBBS (Fry is in the centre, seated). Information about the photo.
- 1915 photo of Fry at Gallipoli (Australian War Memorial archives). Information about the circumstances of the photo (ANZACDay.org.au)
