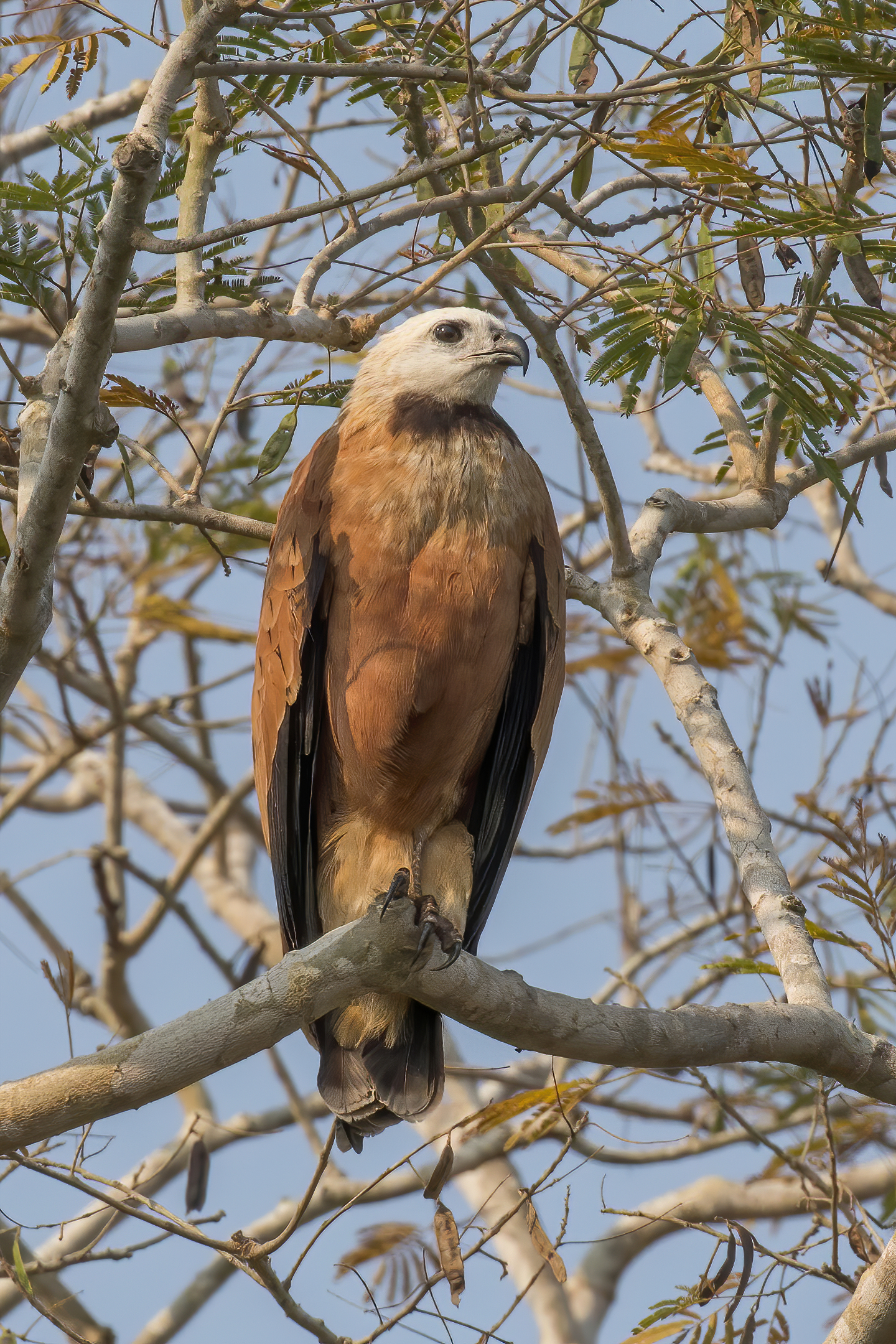
- Adult in Pantanal, Brazil
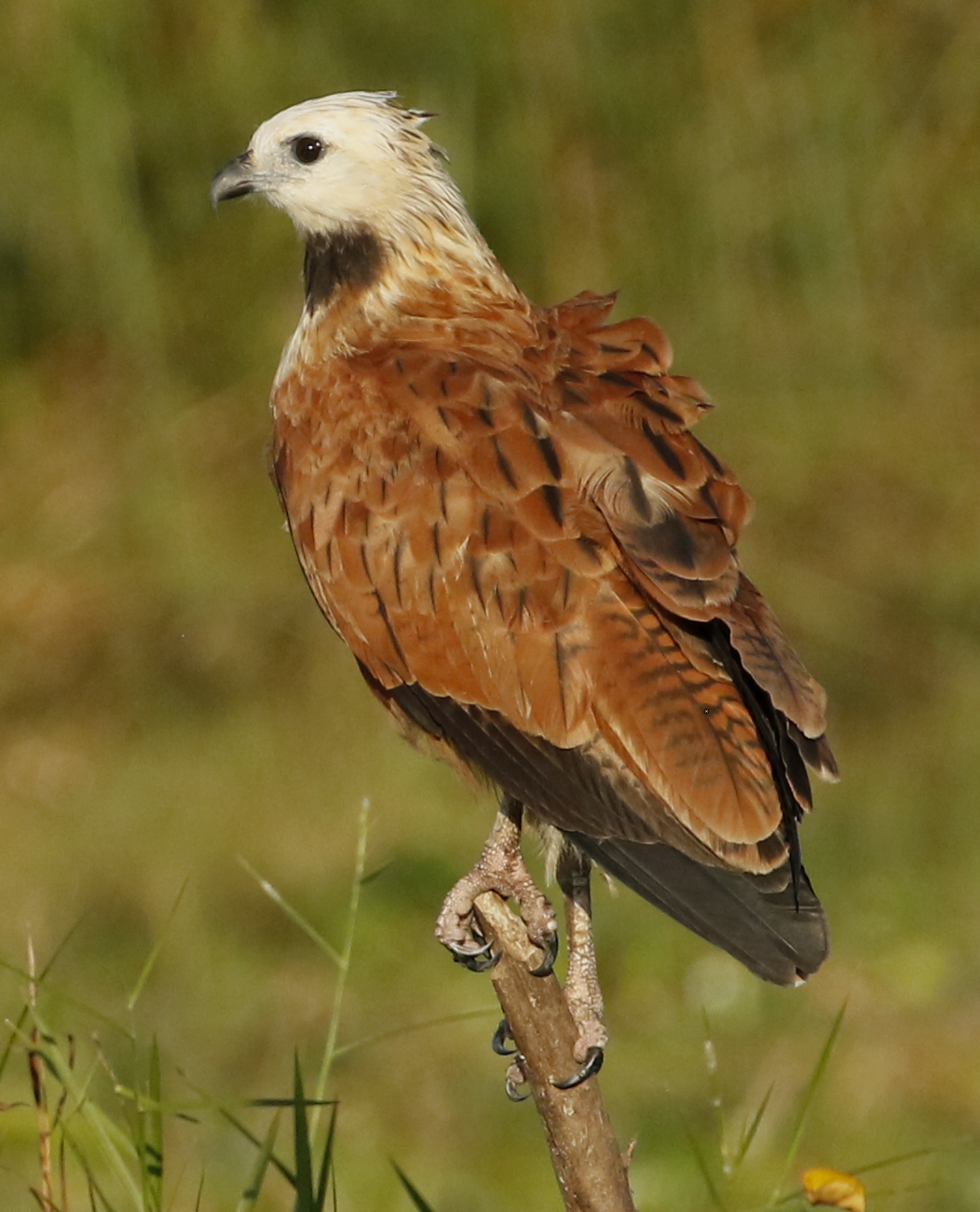
- Medio Queso, near Los Chiles, Costa Rica

Conservation status
- Least Concern (IUCN 3.1)

Scientific classification
- Kingdom: Animalia
- Phylum: Chordata
- Class: Aves
- Order: Accipitriformes
- Family: Accipitridae
- Subfamily: Buteoninae
- Genus: Busarellus; Lesson, 1843
- Species: B. nigricollis

Binomial name
- Busarellus nigricollis (Latham, 1790)

Subspecies
- B. n. nigricollis - (Latham, 1790); B. n. leucocephalus - (Vieillot, 1816)
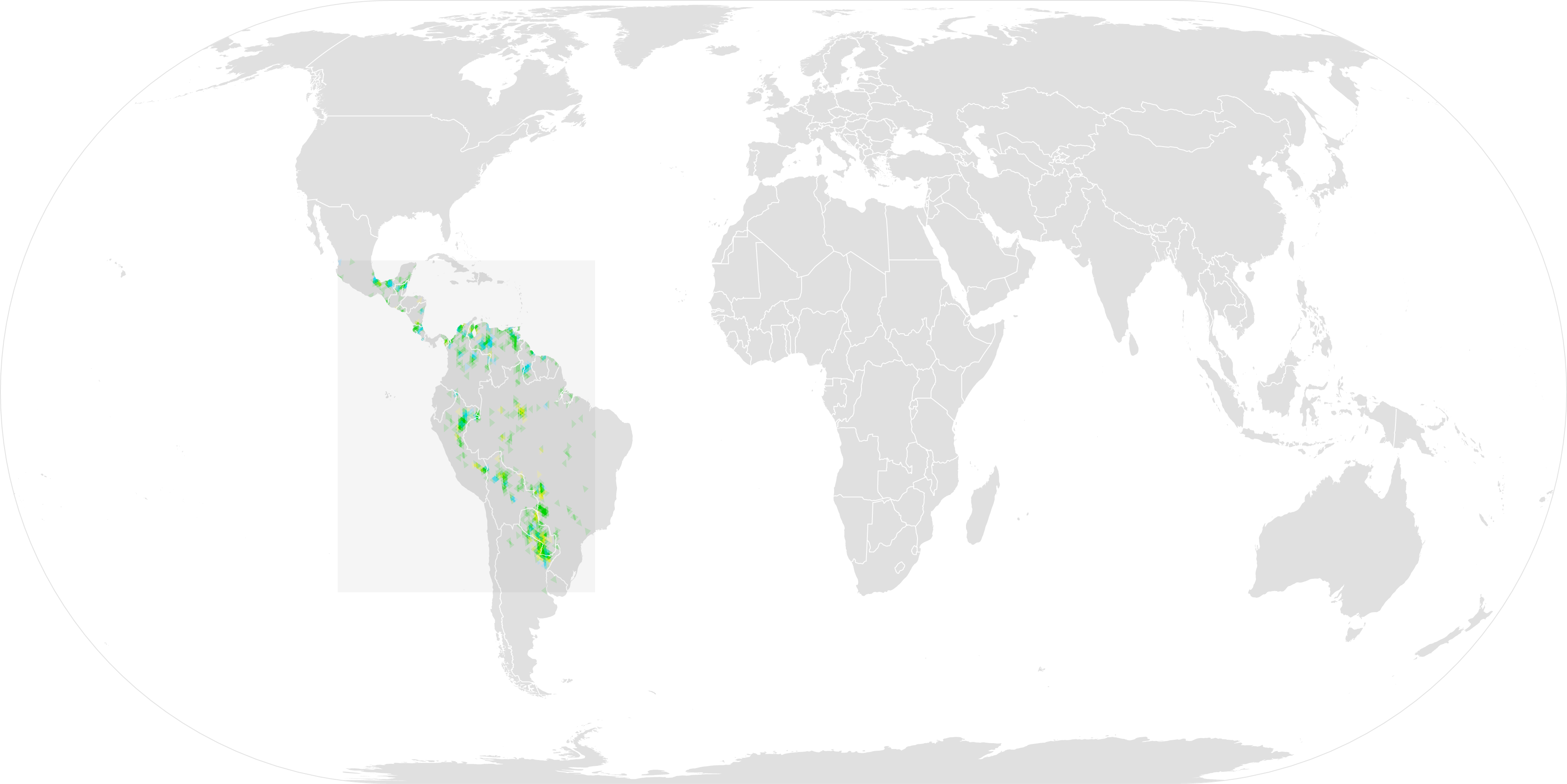
- Global range Year-Round Range Summer Range Winter Range

= Black-collared hawk =

Species of bird

The black-collared hawk (Busarellus nigricollis) is a species of bird of prey in the family Accipitridae. It is monotypic within the genus Busarellus. It has a widespread range of presence, from western Mexico to Uruguay. Its natural habitats are subtropical or tropical moist lowland forests, subtropical or tropical swamps, and swamps.

The adult black-collared hawk has a more or less white head, tinged with buff, and with black shaft streaks on the crown. The body, above and below, and the mantle are bright cinnamon-rufous, paler on the chest. There is a black crescent on the upper breast. The back has scattered black shaft stripes; the flight and tail feathers are black with the base of the tail barred with rufous. The eyes are bright reddish brown, the cere and bill black, and the legs bluish white. Immatures are similar, but blotched with black, including on the crown, and the rufous barring on the tail is more extensive. The pale area on the chest is also more clearly marked. The upper surface of the wings is barred, and the eyes are brown.

The nest is usually placed in a large tree, frequently near water, but sometimes in shade trees in coffee plantations or suburban areas. The nest is lined with green leaves. The female lays three to five eggs, dull white, spotted with pale yellow-brown or red-brown and a few darker freckles. There is no further information on its reproduction.

The black-collared hawk lives on a diet mainly composed of fish. It also eats water bugs and occasionally other large insects, snakes, lizards, frogs, snails, other molluscs, crustaceans, small birds and nestlings, rodents and other small mammals.

In the 1870s, Ridgeway wrote that Busarellus (then known as Ichthyoborus) had the "general form and appearance of Buteogallus aequinoctialis", but that it "is much more nearly related to the heliatine groups", in which he included Milvus, Haliastur, and Haliaaetus. During the early-to-mid 20th century, Busarellus was conventionally placed near Buteogallus in taxonomic order.

The black-collared hawk has the basal phalanges of the inner toe fused, which may be an adaptation to prevent the toe from bending back when catching prey. This feature is shared with Ictinia and with the group of true milvine kites and sea eagles (Milvus, Haliastur, Haliaaetus, and Icthyophaga). Research in molecular phylogenetics during the early 21st century indicates that there is a clear milvine–haliaetine clade that is related to a large group of buteonine hawks and their relatives. Within the buteonine group, Ictinia is near-basal, and Busarellus is a member of a clade shared with Geranospiza, Rostrhamus, and Helicolestes.

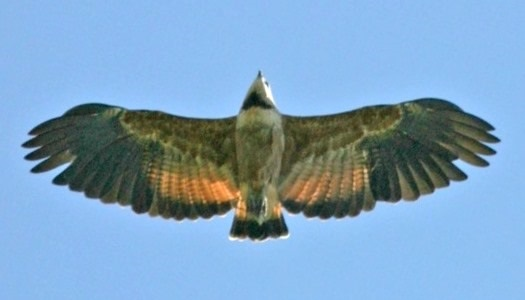
In flight over the Iberá marshes, Argentina

Mato Grosso do Sul, Brazil

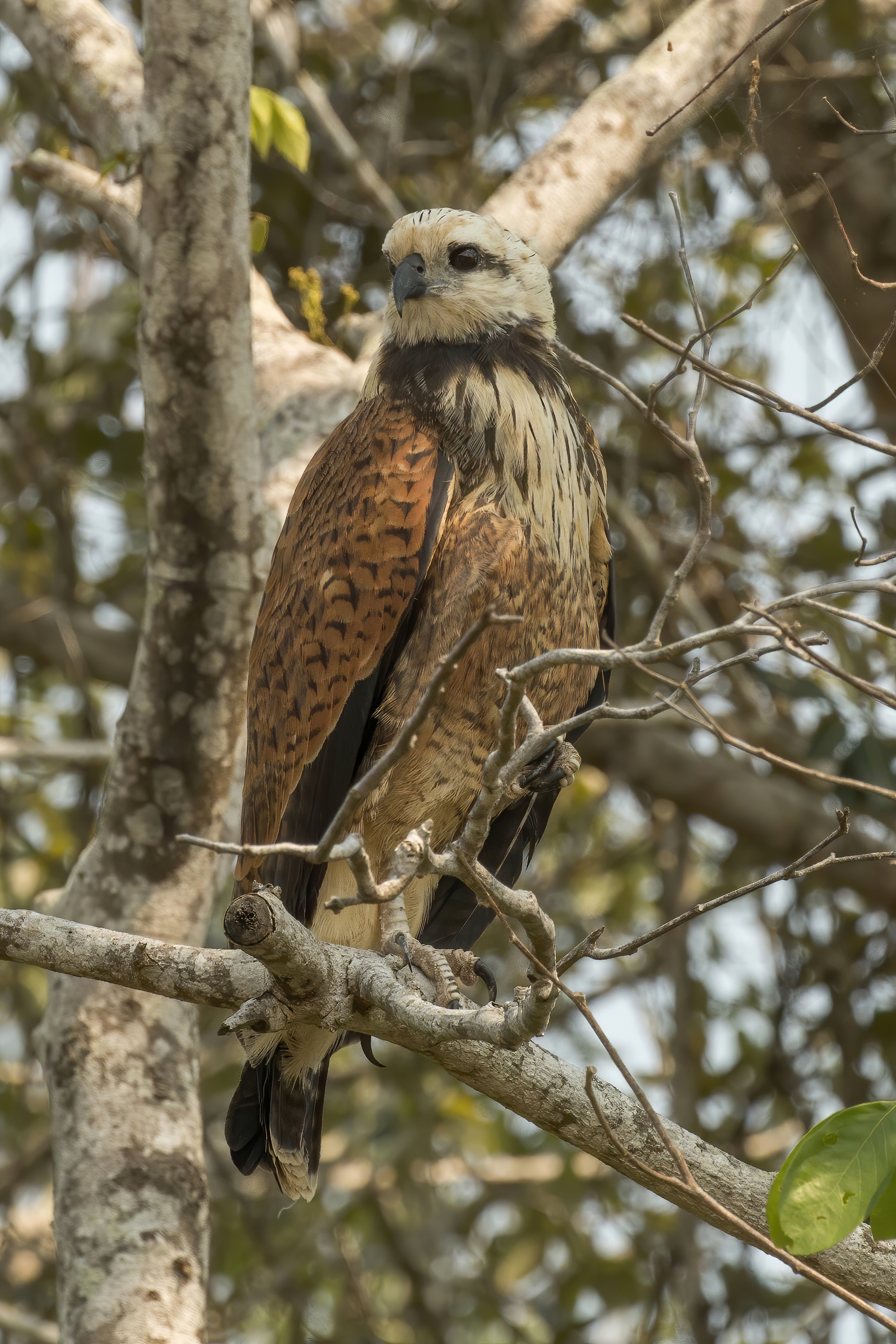
immature bird
Mato Grosso do Sul, Brazil

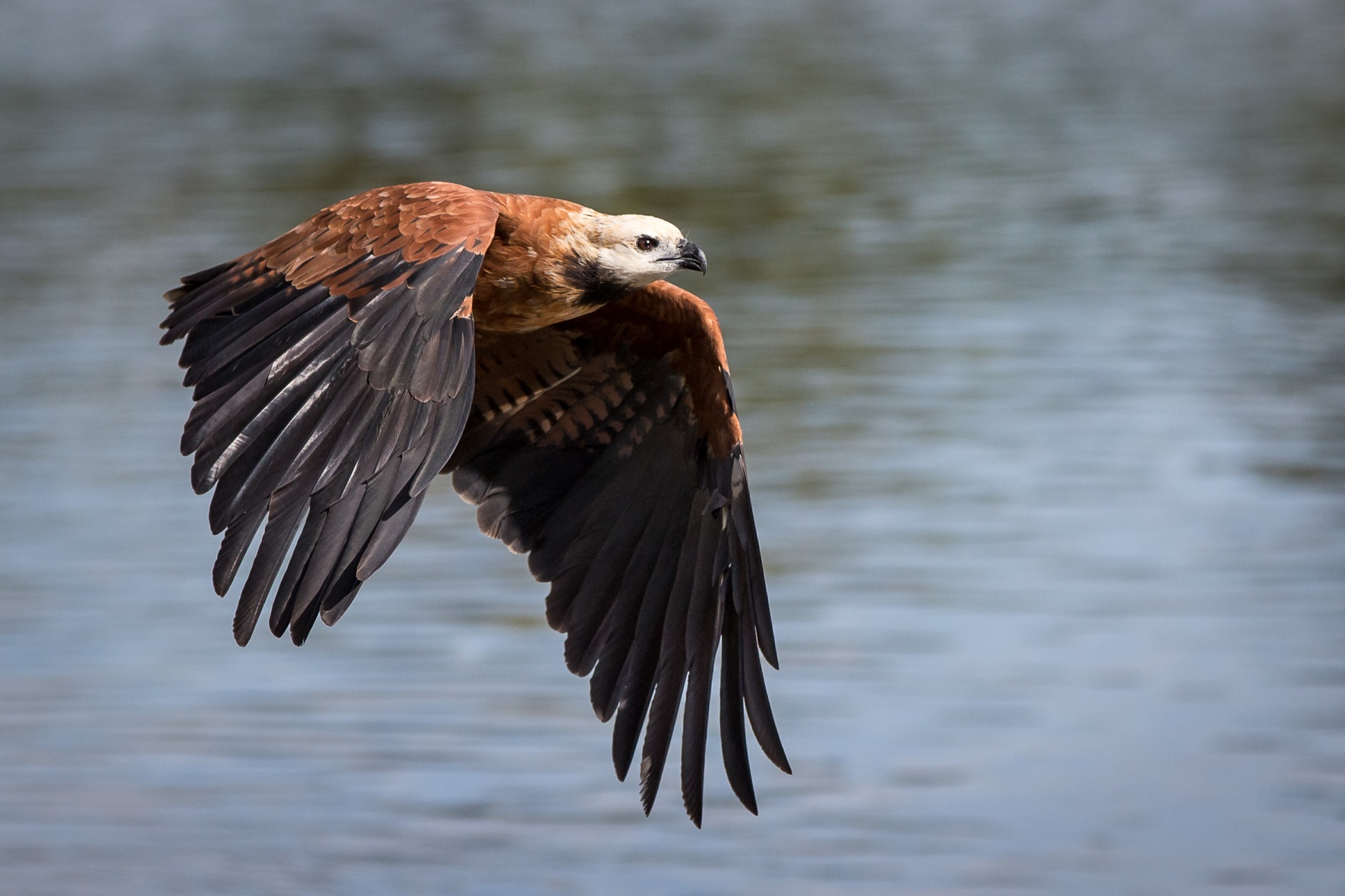
Flying
Mato Grosso do Sul, Brazil
