= David C. Paton =

Conservation ecologist and ornithologist

David Cleland Paton AM
- Occupations: Conservation ecologist, ornithologist, academic, and author
- Relatives: Joan Paton, mother John Burton Cleland, grandfather
- Awards: SA Great Award for the Environment, South Australian Government; Premiers Science Excellence Award, South Australian Government; Member of the Order of Australia (AM), Commonwealth of Australia; D. L. Serventy Medal, BirdLife Australia

Academic background
- Education: B.Sc. (Hons) and Ph.D.
- Alma mater: University of Adelaide; Monash University

David Cleland Paton AM is a conservation ecologist, ornithologist, academic, and author. He is an Adjunct Associate Professor of the School of Biological Sciences at the University of Adelaide and Director of Bio-R, which is an Adelaide-based nonprofit organization. He also co-founded the non-profit organization, Arid Recovery.

Paton is most known for his work on avian ecology and conservation biology, his research on Kangaroo Island and the Coorong, and his contributions to the understanding of the natural systems in Australia for their sustainable management. He is the author of books, At the End of the River: The Coorong and Lower Lakes, and Overview of Feral and Managed Honeybees in Australia: Distribution, Abundance, Extent of Interactions with Native Biota, Evidence of Impacts and Future Research.

Paton is a Member of the Order of Australia (AM), and is an Honorary Life Member of the South Australian Ornithological Association, and Birdlife Australia.

== Education ==
Paton earned a Bachelor of Science degree from the University of Adelaide in 1975, and completed his Ph.D. at Monash University in 1980.

== Career ==
Paton began his academic career at the University of California as a Research Biologist in 1979. In 1981, he was awarded a Queen Elizabeth II Fellowship and spent two years conducting research at the Australian Museum before becoming a senior teaching fellow in the Department of Zoology at the University of Adelaide from 1983 until 1986. He then held various research appointments in the Department of Zoology at the University of Adelaide between 1987 and 1996. Subsequently, he joined the Department of Environmental Biology at University of Adelaide as a Lecturer in 1997, and was appointed a Senior Lecturer in 2000. Having served at that position till 2003, he held an appointment as an associate professor in the School of Earth and Environmental Science there from 2003 till 2019, when he retired. Since 2020, he has been serving as an Adjunct Associate Professor of the School of Biological Sciences in the Faculty of Sciences, Engineering, and Technology at the University of Adelaide.

He managed the Flinders-Baudin (Field) Research Centre on Kangaroo Island for the University of Adelaide from 2000, until the facility was destroyed by wildfire in January 2020.

Paton was a co-founder of the non-profit organization, Arid Recovery, which works for the sustainable restoration of arid ecosystems and the conservation of threatened species in Australia, and served as a board member from 2009 to 2013. He also co-founded Bio-R, and has been directing restoration programs, and revegetation works in Southern Australia since 2008.

== Research ==
Paton's research works have received numerous awards, such as the D. L. Serventy Medal, Member of the Order of Australia, and South Australian Premier's Science Excellence Award. His research spans the fields of ecology, conservation biology, ecosystem restoration, and conservation, with a particular focus on understanding, and managing the natural systems of South Australia.

=== Animal-plant interactions ===
Paton's early research provided the initial evidence that birds, particularly honeyeaters, are efficient pollinators of many of the dominant plant genera in temperate Australia. From the 1970s to the 1990s, his research included detailed field observations combined with small-scale experimental treatments that focused on testing and quantifying various aspects of plant-animal interactions. He investigated the ecology and behavior of the New Holland Honeyeater documenting their diet, breeding schedules, territoriality, population structure and competitive interactions with other honeyeaters. His research also demonstrated how the ecology of many honeyeaters depends on carbohydrates (sugars) with a chemical structure similar to nectar, such as manna, honeydew, and lerp.

Paton's research on the interactions between honeybees and Australian biota highlighted that, while honeybees were thought to be beneficial for the Australian environment because they may aid in the pollination of native plants, they can displace native pollinators and not contribute to pollination. He indicated how the interactions between honeybees, and biota are rather complex, both spatially and temporally. Later, he and Thomas Celebrezze investigated the effect of introducing honeybees on the pollination of bird-adapted Australian plants, reporting that, while honeybees were significantly more frequent visitors to flowers, native birds played an important role in maximizing fruit set.

=== Management of Australia’s natural environment ===
Paton has contributed to the study and management of Australia's natural environment for decades, and is known for his research work on Kangaroo Island and the Coorong, with a particular emphasis on managing and protecting ecosystems.

Paton established and has maintained long-term monitoring initiatives since the 1990s in order to record trends, educate the public, and support local efforts intended to deliver quantifiable biodiversity outcomes. This includes monitoring woodland birds and their habitats in the Mt Lofty region, and biota using mallee-heaths in South Australia. One of the significant long-term programs includes monitoring waterbirds in the Coorong and a key aquatic plant Ruppia tuberosa in the Coorong. He highlighted the progressive loss of this plant species, which is considered critical to the Coorong's ecology, i.e., as a food source for waterbirds and a habitat for invertebrates and fish in the Coorong. The findings also emphasized that declining flows to the Murray Mouth in spring was a crucial issue that must be addressed since the reduced flows restrict the time available for these plants to establish, grow, and reproduce. As part of the Coorong monitoring program, recent investigations showed how filamentous green algae affected seed production of Ruppia tuberosa as well as access to food for waterbirds.

=== Habitat restoration and re-vegetation ===
Paton's long-term research and monitoring have highlighted the ongoing declines of woodland birds in the Mt. Lofty region of South Australia and the need for large-scale habitat re-establishment to prevent these declines. This has resulted in an increased emphasis on how to re-establish self-sustaining and resilient woodland habitats on land cleared for agriculture at landscape scales to help meet the needs of declining species. These revegetation projects are largely managed through Bio-R and include restoring native vegetation to Cygnet Park on Kangaroo Island and to Frahns Farm, near Monarto, South Australia.

== Awards and honors ==
- 1981-1982 – Queen Elizabeth II Fellowship, The Australian Research Council
- 1991-1995 – ARC Australian Research Fellowship, Australian Government
- 1999 – SA Great Award for the Environment, South Australian Government
- 2004 – Natural History Medallion, Field Naturalists Society of South Australia
- 2004 – Executive Dean of Sciences Award, University of Adelaide
- 2004 – The Stephen Cole the Elder Prize, University of Adelaide
- 2006 – Carrick Citation for Outstanding Contributions to Student Learning
- 2006 – Premiers Science Excellence Award, South Australian Government
- 2008 – Member General Order of Australia (AM), Commonwealth of Australia
- 2011 – Whitley Commendation, Royal Zoological Society of New South Wales
- 2011 – D. L. Serventy Medal, BirdLife Australia

== Bibliography ==
=== Selected books ===
- The Dynamic Partnership: Birds and Plants in Southern Australia (1986) ISBN 9780724346400
- Overview of feral and managed honeybees in Australia: distribution, abundance, extent of interactions with native biota, evidence of impacts and future research(1996) ISBN 064221381X
- Securing long-term floral resources for the honeybee industry (2008) ISBN 1741516757
- At the End of the River: The Coorong and Lower Lakes (2010) ISBN 9781921511660
- Floral resources used by the South Australian apiary industry: a report for the Rural Industries Research and Development Corporation (2014) ISBN 064258799X

=== Selected articles ===
- Paton, D. C., & Ford, H. A. (1977). Pollination by birds of native plants in South Australia. Emu - Austral Ornithology, 77(2), 73–85.
- Paton, D. C. (1980). The importance of manna, honeydew and lerp in the diets of honeyeaters. Emu, 80(4), 213–226.
- PATON, D. C. (1982). The diet of the New Holland honeyeater, Phylidonyris novaehollandiae. Australian Journal of Ecology, 7(3), 279–298.
- Carpenter, F. L., Paton, D. C., & Hixon, M. A. (1983). Weight gain and adjustment of feeding territory size in migrant hummingbirds. Proceedings of the National Academy of Sciences, 80(23), 7259–7263.
- Hixon, M. A., Carpenter, F. L., & Paton, D. C. (1983). Territory area, flower density, and time budgeting in hummingbirds: an experimental and theoretical analysis. The American Naturalist, 122(3), 366–391.
- Paton, D. C., & Carpenter, F. L. (1984). Peripheral foraging by territorial rufous hummingbirds: defense by exploitation. Ecology, 65(6), 1808–1819.
- Paton, D. C. (1993). Honeybees in the Australian environment. Bioscience, 43(2), 95–103.
- Paton, D. (1996). Overview of feral and managed honeybees in Australia: distribution, abundance, extent of interactions with native biota, evidence of impacts and future research.
- Paton, D. C. (2000). Disruption of bird-plant pollination systems in southern Australia. Conservation Biology, 14(5), 1232–1234.
- Paton, D. C., Rogers, D. J., & Harris, W. (2004). Birdscaping the environment: restoring the woodland systems of the Mt Lofty region, South Australia. Conservation of Australia's forest fauna, 331–358.
- Paton, D. C., Rogers, D. J., Hill, B. M., Bailey, C. P., & Ziembicki, M. (2009). Temporal changes to spatially stratified waterbird communities of the Coorong, South Australia: implications for the management of heterogenous wetlands. Animal Conservation, 12(5), 408–417.
- Moseby, K. E., Read, J. L., Paton, D. C., Copley, P., Hill, B. M., & Crisp, H. A. (2011). Predation determines the outcome of 10 reintroduction attempts in arid South Australia. Biological Conservation, 144(12), 2863–2872.
- McCallum, K. P., Breed, M. F., Lowe, A. J., & Paton, D. C. (2019). Plants, position and pollination: planting arrangement and pollination limitation in a revegetated eucalypt woodland. Ecological Management & Restoration, 20(3), 222–230.

== Personal ==
Paton's mother was ornithologist Joan Paton (1916–2000). His grandfather was naturalist and microbiologist John Burton Cleland (1878–1971).
