= Joan Paton =

Australian ornithologist

Joan Burton Paton AM née Cleland (1916–April 2000) was an Australian teacher, naturalist, environmentalist and ornithologist. One of the first women to become a member of the exclusive Adelaide Ornithologists Club, of which she was elected President 1991–1993, she also served as president of the South Australian Ornithological Association (1979-1982). Her father was Professor Sir John Burton Cleland, a notable microbiologist and pathologist who strongly encouraged her early interest in natural history.

== Early life and education ==
Joan Burton Paton was born in Sydney, New South Wales, the daughter of John Burton Cleland (1878–1971) and his wife, Dora Isabel Paton (1880–1955). She had three sisters, Dr Margaret Burton Cleland, Elizabeth Robson Cleland and Barbara Burton Cleland; and a brother, William Paton 'Bill' Cleland, who became a surgeon. The father encouraged his children's interest in science. Joan Paton was educated at the University of Adelaide, where she majored in organic chemistry and biochemistry. In 1951 she married Erskine Norman Paton (1922–1985), son of Adolph Ernest Paton and Ida Marie Poynton. Their son is Prof David Cleland Paton.

== Career ==
In 1967 Paton became a lecturer on ornithology in South Australia's Workers' Educational Association. Among those she inspired to work in ornithology and environmental conservation was Margaret Cameron, who became the president of the Royal Australasian Ornithologists Union (RAOU).

Paton was active in the RAOU, as well as in the South Australian Ornithological Association (SAOA), of which she was elected Vice-President 1974–1979, and President 1979–1982. She was one of the first women to become a member of the exclusive Adelaide Ornithologists Club, of which she was elected president (1991-1993).

== Legacy and honours ==
- 1990, she was made an Honorary Member of the SAOA.
- 1996, she was made an Honorary Member of the Adelaide Ornithologists Club.
- In 1996, Paton was made a Member in the General Division of the Order of Australia for services to ornithology, education and the environment.
