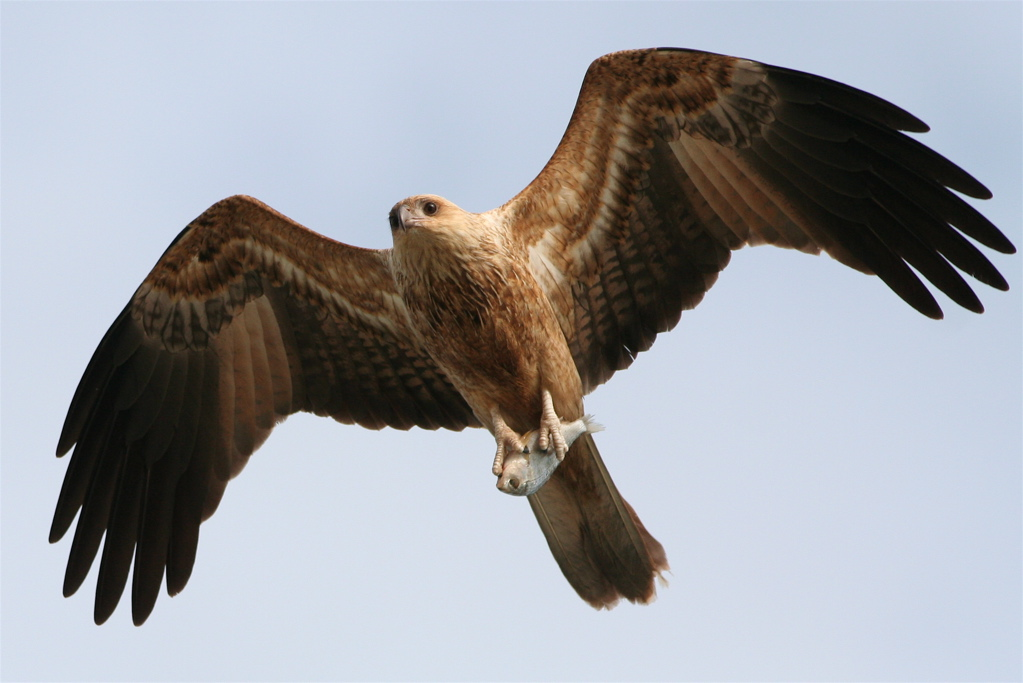
- Whistling kite (Haliastur sphenurus)

Scientific classification
- Kingdom: Animalia
- Phylum: Chordata
- Class: Aves
- Order: Accipitriformes
- Family: Accipitridae
- Subfamily: Buteoninae
- Genus: Haliastur; Selby, 1840

Type species
- Falco pondicerianus Gmelin, 1788

Species
- H. indus H. sphenurus

= Haliastur =

Genus of birds

Haliastur is a genus of medium-sized diurnal birds of prey. It consists of two species of kites which form part of the subfamily Milvinae; some authorities place these species in the genus Milvus, despite clear differences in behaviour, voice and plumage.

The genus was erected by the English naturalist Prideaux John Selby in 1840 with the brahminy kite (Haliastur indus) as the type species. The name of the genus combines the Ancient Greek hali- "sea-" and the Latin astur meaning "hawk".

== Description ==
The two Haliastur species are medium-sized birds of prey with a strong, slightly squat rump, small head, relatively short and wide wings, a medium-long, rounded tail and short but strong legs and toes.

The whistling kite reaches a body length of 50 to 60 centimeters and has a wingspan of 120 to 145 centimeters. Males weigh an average of 700 grams, the females are significantly heavier at 850 grams. The brahminy kite is a little smaller. Its body length is 44–52 cm, of which 18–22 cm are accounted for by the tail. The span is 110–125 cm. There is no sexual dimorphism in either species, but the females are slightly larger than the males in both species.

The whistling kite has a sand-colored to brown plumage, which is partly dashed. Fledglings have only slightly different plumage than the adult birds. This is different with the brahminy kite. In adult birds of this species, the head, neck, chest and upper abdomen are white with a more or less distinct, fine, dark longitudinal stripe. The back, upper wing coverts, the upper side of the arm wings, the upper side of the inner wing wing and the basal half of the outer wing wing, the small and middle under wing coverts, the lower abdomen and the leg fletching are dark rust-red. The young birds of this species are all in all almost monochrome, dark blackish gray-brown. The head, neck and the underside of the trunk are spotted and dashed lighter brown. They are thus similar to the adult wedge-tailed harriers and can be confused with one another when observing in the field

== Species list ==
Both of the species found in this genus are large for kites; both are relatively small-headed and have rounded tail tips.

Genus Haliastur – G.R. Gray, 1840 – two species
Common name	Scientific name and subspecies	Range	Size and ecology	IUCN status and estimated population
Brahminy kite	Haliastur indus (Boddaert, 1783) Four subspecies: Haliastur indus indus (Boddaert, 1783) – South Asia; Haliastur indus intermedius Blyth, 1865 – Malay Peninsula, Greater and Lesser Sunda Islands, Sulawesi and the Philippines; Haliastur indus girrenera (Vieillot, 1822) – New Guinea, Bismarck Archipelago and north Australia; Haliastur indus flavirostris Condon & Amadon, 1954 – Solomon Islands	Sri Lanka, Nepal, India, Pakistan, Bangladesh, and southeast Asia and as far south as New South Wales, Australia	Size: Habitat: Diet:	LC
Whistling kite	Haliastur sphenurus (Vieillot, 1818)	Australia (including coastal islands), New Caledonia and much of New Guinea	Size: Habitat: Diet:	LC

== Distribution ==
The distribution area of the genus extends from the Indian subcontinent to New Caledonia and Tasmania.

The distribution area of the whistling kite extends from Cenderawasih Bay in western New Guinea to Goodenough Island in the Solomon Sea off the east coast of New Guinea. The range also includes the Solomon Islands east of New Guinea and New Caledonia off the Australian northeast coast. In Australia the wedge-tailed harrier is a very widespread species. It is only absent in parts of the Great Sand Desert. the Nullarbor Desert, the Great Victoria Desert, and the Gibson Desert. The distribution area of the brahminy kite includes large parts of the Indian subcontinent, Southeast Asia, New Guinea as well as the east and north of Australia.
