= Anthropological Society of South Australia =

The Anthropological Society of South Australia was established in 1926 with the aim to promote the study of anthropology, archaeology and other related disciplines.

Early members of the society included Norman Tindale, Charles Mountford, Frederic Wood Jones, Thomas Campbell and Robert Pulleine who were pioneers in the study of anthropology and archaeology in Australia. The Society gathered an important ethnographic collection, compiled by members from a range of sources and other documentary materials collected in the 1920s, which is now housed in the South Australian Museum.

The society produces an annual journal called Journal of the Anthropological Society of South Australia.
