= Alan Harding Lendon =

Alan Harding Lendon (1903–1973) was a South Australian surgeon, aviculturist and amateur ornithologist. He was a member of the Royal Australasian Ornithologists Union (RAOU), and served it as president in 1966–1967. He was also strongly associated with the South Australian Ornithological Association (SAOA) until a schism in the membership, regarding the necessity of controlling the live bird export trade, led him in 1960 to form a breakaway group, the Adelaide Ornithologists Club.
