= Thomas Draper Campbell =

Australian dental anthropologist and filmmaker (1893–1967)

Thomas Draper Campbell (March 24, 1893–December 8, 1967) was an Australian scholar of dental anthropology, as well as a playwright, composer, and filmmaker. He was a founder of the Board of Anthropological Research and was serving as its Chairman at the time of his death. Among many roles at the University of Adelaide he served as Dean of the Faculty of Dentistry.

== Life and films ==
He was born in Millicent, South Australia to the former Lucy Walters and Walter Campbell, a storekeeper. In 1907 the family moved to Adelaide where he attended Prince Alfred College. In November 1917 he joined the Australian Army Medical Corps Reserve (Dental) as an honorary lieutenant. He received his BDS (1921), DDS (1923), and DSc (1939) from the University of Adelaide, where he became a Lecturer in 1925. His doctoral research, which examined Aboriginal skeletal material in the South Australian Museum’s collections, noted the difference between Aboriginal and European dentition and set new standards for dental anthropology upon its 1925 publication. From 1921 to 1926 Campbell was House Surgeon at the Adelaide Hospital, Dental Department; he was promoted to Dental Superintendent in 1926. He married Elizabeth Jane Young, an actress, on December 9, 1927 in Adelaide and they had no children.

Campbell is also the playwright of The Moon Dream, a musical comedy for which he also composed the score, which was performed in 1932 at the Theatre Royal in Adelaide. Campbell had a lifelong interest in music and was a founding Councilmember of the University of Adelaide Theatre Guild from 1938 to 1950. He became an accomplished filmmaker of archaeological expeditions; following his 1926 work in Ooldea he produced many hours of films of Aboriginal subsistence techniques, artefact preparation and ceremonial activities. Considered a pioneer of ethnographic filmmaking in Australia, he wrote and directed nine color films about the crafts and skills of the Warlpiri people, in the Yuendumu settlement northwest of Alice Springs, Northern Territory. Produced largely between 1951 and 1961, his films included ‘So they did eat’ (1953), ‘The Woomera’ (1958), and ‘Ngoora’ (1965) and they are preserved with his professional papers (1926-1965) in the South Australian Museum Archives. His archival collection of over 200 slides documenting Aboriginal art is housed in Special Collections and Archives, University of Adelaide.

=== Physical and dental anthropology career ===
Campbell was elected Dean of the Faculty of Dentistry in 1938 and remained in that role until his retirement, in 1958. He accompanied Frederick Wood Jones (Curator of Anthropology at the South Australian Museum and a professor of anatomy at University of Adelaide) on ethnographic fieldwork in the early 1920s, and was appointed Honorary Assistant Curator of Anthropology (1923-1927) at the South Australian Museum. Campbell was subsequently Honorary Curator of Anthropology there (1927-1939) and a founding member of the museum's Board from 1940 until his death. Between 1925 and 1939 Campbell served as secretary of and organized 15 expeditions for the university's Board for Anthropological Research (BAR) to outback South Australia and the Northern Territory, among them the BAR’s first four official expeditions- to Wilgena (1925), Ooldea (1926), Macumba (1926-7) and Koonibba (1928)- which he also led.

In addition to his scholarly papers about Australian Aboriginal archaeology, anthropology, dentition, and diet, Campbell was a frequent presenter on ABC Radio about natural history and dentistry topics. He contributed letters to newspapers and magazines, often under the pseudonym Bingi, his nickname to close friends. Campbell was a life member of the Anthropological Society of South Australia and was elected its President three times (1928, 1929 and 1944). He served as President of the Royal Society of South Australia in 1934-35. He was also a ANZAAS fellow, FRCS member, and Australian College of Dental Surgeons fellow.

== Death ==
Campbell died at his Tusmore home and was survived by his wife Elizabeth Jane (Young) Campbell.
