= Calytrix watsonii =

Scientific classification
- Kingdom: Plantae
- Clade: Tracheophytes
- Clade: Angiosperms
- Clade: Eudicots
- Clade: Rosids
- Order: Myrtales
- Family: Myrtaceae
- Genus: Calytrix
- Species: C. watsonii

Binomial name
- Calytrix watsonii (F.Muell. & Tate) C.A.Gardner

Synonyms
- Calycothrix watsoni F.Muell. & Tate orth. var.; Calycothrix watsonii F.Muell. & Tate; Calythrix watsonii C.A.Gardner orth. var.

Species of flowering plant

Calytrix watsonii is a species of flowering plant in the myrtle family Myrtaceae and is endemic to inland areas of Western Australia. It is a shrub with elliptic or oblong leaves and pale to medium yellow flowers with about 45 to 70 stamens in several rows.

== Description ==
Calytrix watsonii is a shrub that typically grows to up to 0.4–1.4 m (1 ft 4 in – 4 ft 7 in) high and 2 m (6 ft 7 in) wide. Its leaves are elliptic or oblong, 2–3 mm (0.079–0.118 in) long and 0.7–1.4 mm (0.028–0.055 in) wide on a petiole 0.4–1 mm (0.016–0.039 in) long. There are stipules up to 0.4 mm (0.016 in) long at the base of the petiole. The flowers are borne on a peduncle 0.5–2.5 mm (0.020–0.098 in) long with bracteoles 3.5–6 mm (0.14–0.24 in) long and fused at the base. The floral tube is 4.5–7 mm (0.18–0.28 in) long and has five ribs. The five sepals are hairy on the outside, mostly glabrous on the inner surface, 5.5–10 mm (0.22–0.39 in) long with an awn 3.5–6 mm (0.14–0.24 in) long. The five petals are pale to medium yellow, 6.5–9.5 mm (0.26–0.37 in) long, and there are usually 45 to 70 stamens in several rows,. Flowering occurs from August to November and the fruit is about 1.5 mm (0.059 in) in diameter with a narrowly oval seed about 3.5 mm (0.14 in) long and 1.2–1.3 mm (0.047–0.051 in) in diameter.

== Taxonomy ==
This species was first formally described in 1896 by Ferdinand von Mueller and Ralph Tate who gave it the name Calycothrix watsonii. In 1931, Charles Austin Gardner transferred the species to Calytrix as C. watsonii. The specific epithet (watsonii) honours Archibald Watson, one of the organisers of the 1891 Elder expedition, funder by Sir Thomas Elder, to the Wiluna area.

== Distribution and habitat ==
Calytrix watsonii is found between Wiluna to Kambalda in the Coolgardie and Murchison bioregions of inland Western Australia, where it often grows on red sand dunes, sometimes on islands in salt lakes.

== Conservation status ==
Calytrix watsonii is listed as "not threatened" by the Government of Western Australia Department of Biodiversity, Conservation and Attractions.
