= John Neil McGilp =

South Australian pastoralist and ornithologist (1881–1963)

John Neil McGilp OBE (30 October 1881 – 1963) was a South Australian pastoralist and amateur ornithologist. He was a foundation member of the Royal Australasian Ornithologists Union (RAOU), and served as President of the organisation in 1938–1939. He was also President of the South Australian Ornithological Association (SAOA) in 1935-1936 and 1948–1949. He was also the founding President of the Adelaide Ornithologists Club in 1960. A keen oologist, he presented the South Australian Museum with his comprehensive collection of some 2500 clutches of the eggs of Australian birds.
