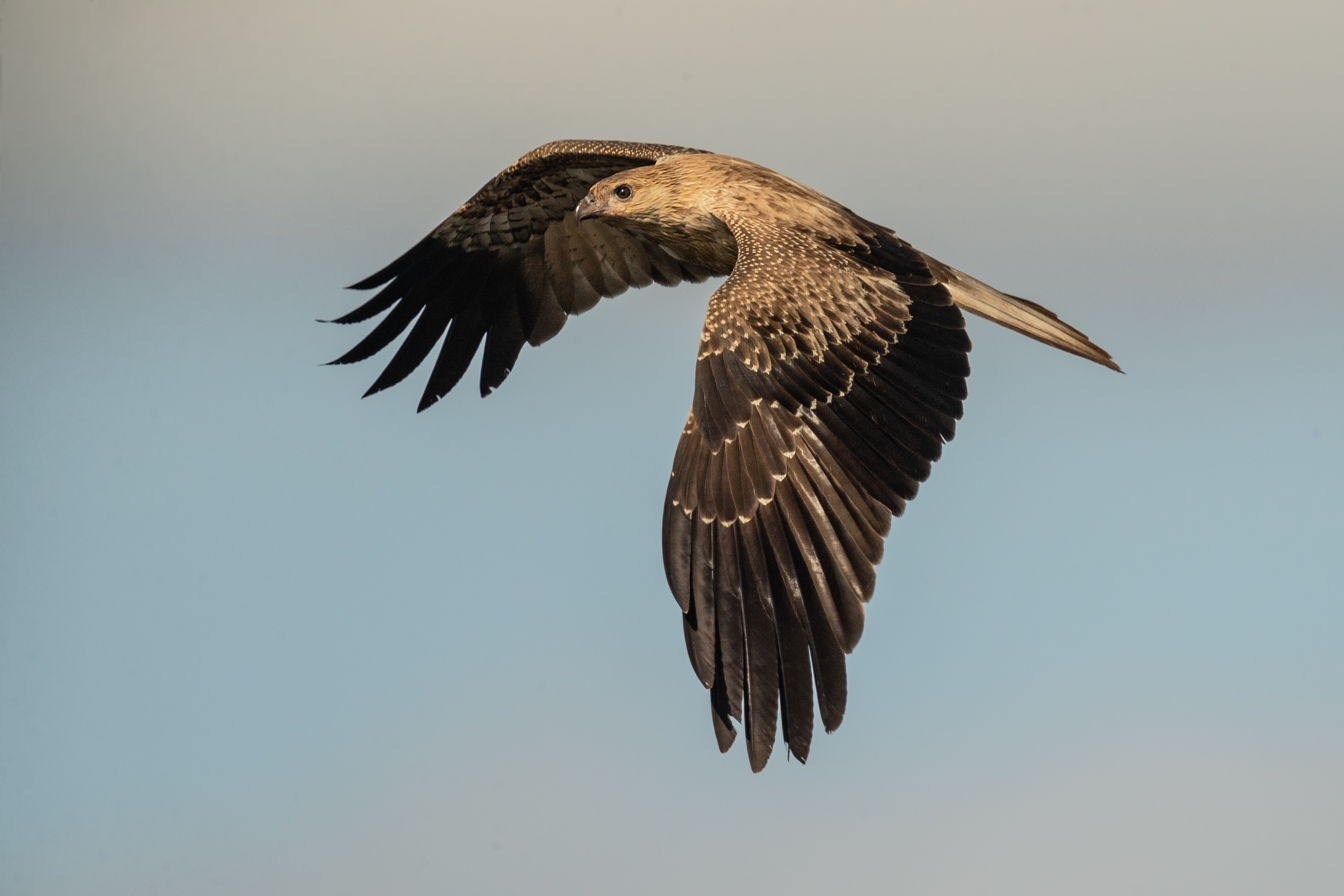

Conservation status
- Least Concern (IUCN 3.1)

Scientific classification
- Kingdom: Animalia
- Phylum: Chordata
- Class: Aves
- Order: Accipitriformes
- Family: Accipitridae
- Genus: Haliastur
- Species: H. sphenurus

Binomial name
- Haliastur sphenurus (Vieillot, 1818)

= Whistling kite =

Species of bird

The whistling kite (Haliastur sphenurus) is a medium-sized diurnal raptor found throughout Australia (including coastal islands), New Caledonia and much of New Guinea (excluding the central mountains and the northwest). Also called the whistling eagle or whistling hawk, it is named for its loud whistling call, which it often gives in flight. Some authorities put this species in the genus Milvus, despite marked differences in behaviour, voice and plumage between this species and other members of that genus.

It is one of three birds that intentionally sets or spreads fires to catch prey. The other two are the black kite and brown falcon.

== Description ==
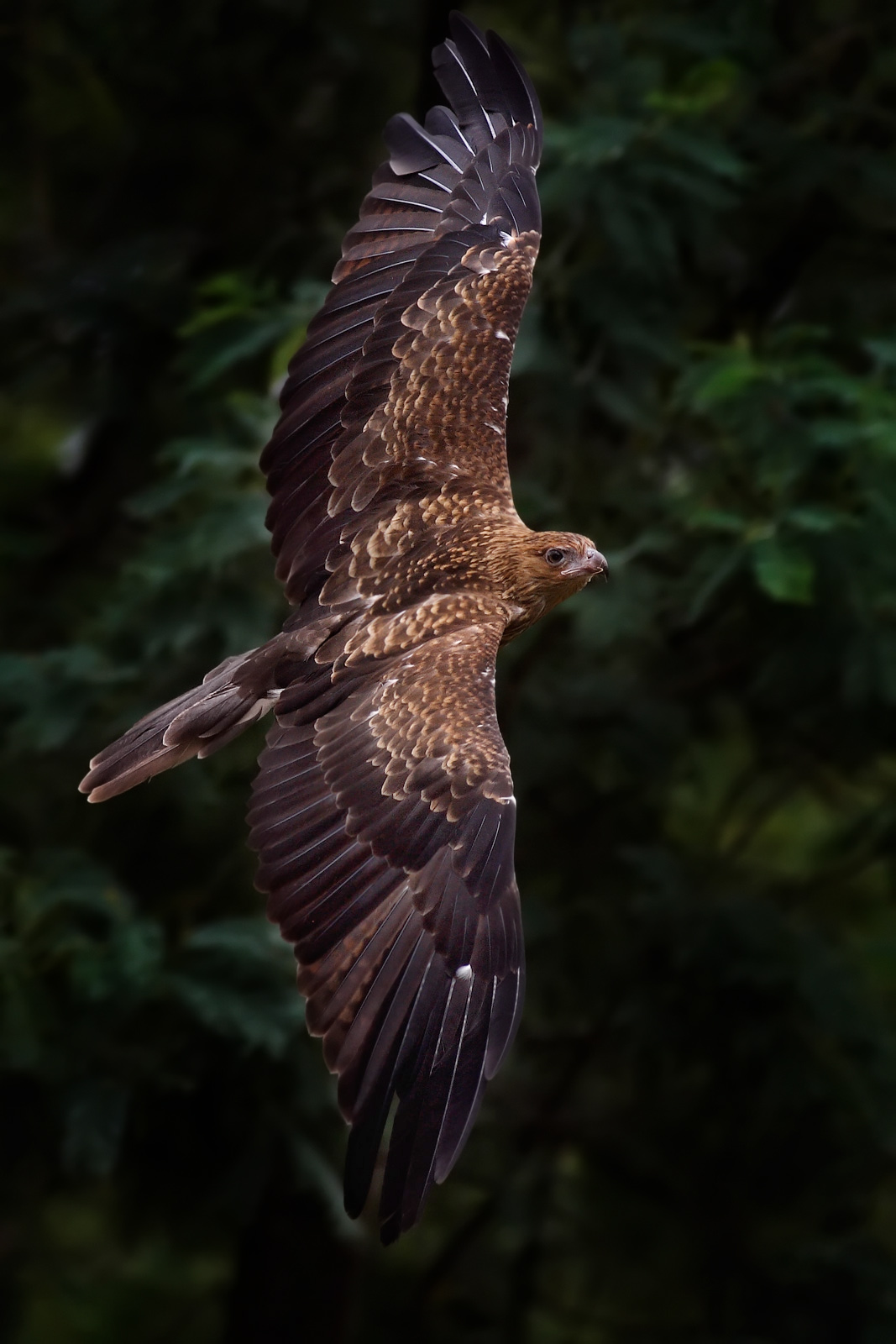
Flying in Victoria, Australia

The whistling kite ranges in size from 50 to 60 cm (20 to 24 in), with a wingspan between 123 and 146 cm (4 ft 0 in and 4 ft 9 in). Weights range from 380 to 1,050 g (0.84 to 2.31 lb) an average of 600 to 750 g (1.32 to 1.65 lb) for males and 750 to 1,000 g (1.65 to 2.20 lb) for females. As with most raptors, females are larger and heavier than males; though there is considerable overlap between the sexes, females can be up to 21% larger and 42% heavier.

Southern birds are also larger than those found in the tropics. Male and female plumages are the same. Adult birds are a pale buff on the head, breast and tail, with browner wings and black flight feathers. Immature birds are a heavily streaked reddish-brown with prominent pale spots on the wings. Throughout their lives, whistling kites have bone-colored legs and feet, which are unfeathered. Overall, the whistling kite looks small-headed and long-tailed, with wingtips falling well short of the tail tip when the bird is perched. Though its legs are short, the bird walks easily on the ground. Whistling kites soar on slightly bowed wings, with their long flight feathers often well-splayed. The striking pattern on their underwings is distinctive.

=== Voice ===
This is a noisy species, calling regularly in flight and while perched—even while at the nest. Its most common call is a clear descending whistle, often followed (less often preceded) by a rapid series of rising notes. Field research carried out in Taunton Scientific National Park, Central Queensland by Fiona Randall from the University of Edinburgh, Scotland has shown that spotted bowerbirds (Chlamydera maculata) in that park regularly mimic the calls of whistling kites, with the frequency of mimicry increasing as the breeding season progresses. The function of this mimicry is unknown.

== Habitat ==
A species of open or lightly wooded areas, whistling kites are typically found near water, at elevations ranging from sea level to 1400 meters. Though the species as a whole is generally sedentary, some Australian birds are known to be nomadic, wandering to coastal areas in northern Australia during the dry season; some south Australian birds migrate to the south in the autumn. There is some evidence that the species is declining locally in southern Australia due to the drainage of wetlands and an accompanying decline in food supplies.

== Behaviour ==
Whistling kites tend to be found singly or in pairs, but sometimes gather in larger groups, particularly during nomadic movements, at roost sites and at sources of plentiful food.

=== Feeding ===
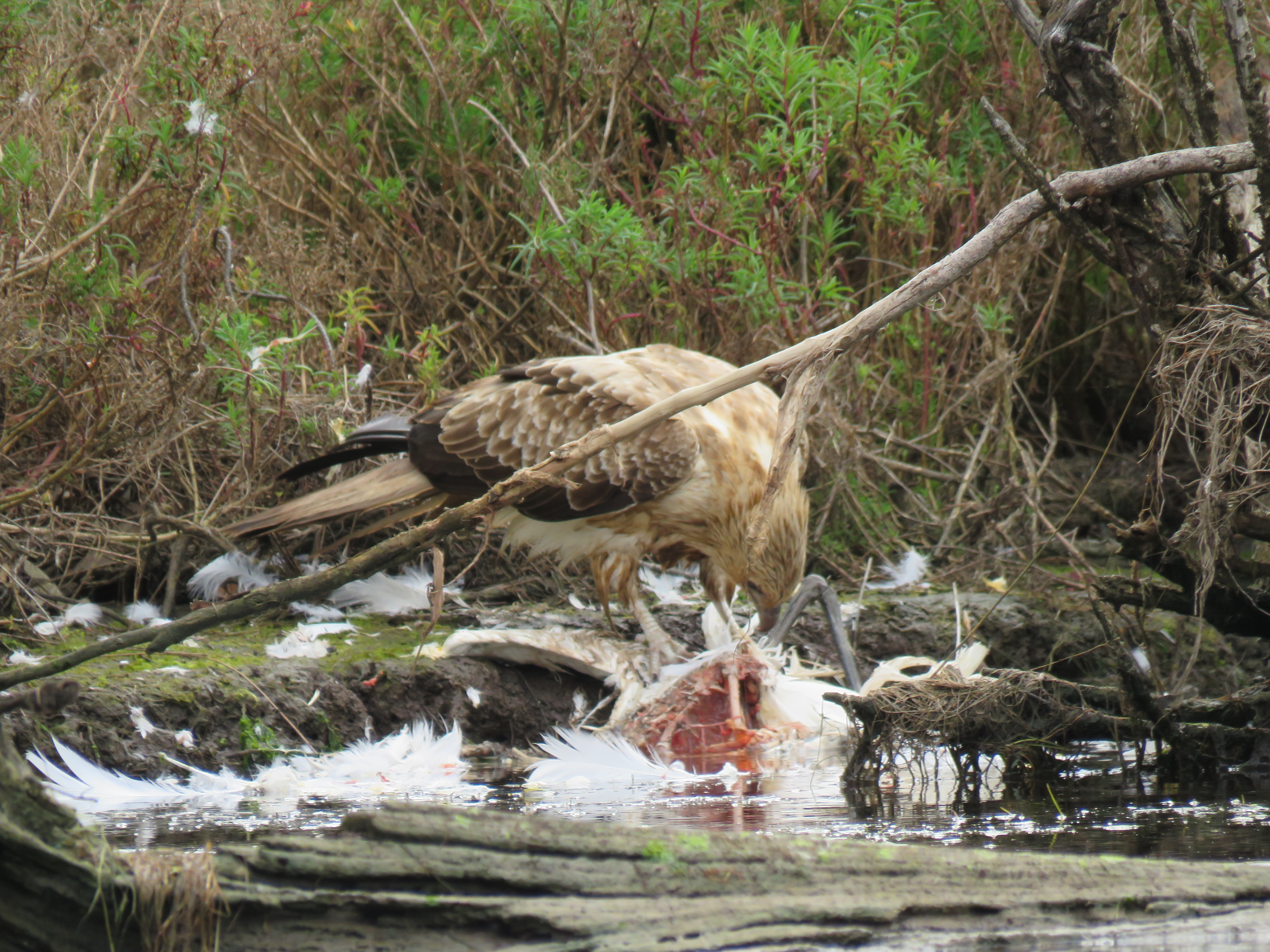
A whistling kite feeding on a dead bird on the Serpentine River, Western Australia

Whistling kites are indiscriminate in their tastes, taking small mammals, birds, fish, reptiles, amphibians, crustaceans, insects and carrion. Those in Australia tend to take primarily live prey (except in the winter, when they subsist largely on carrion), while those in New Guinea are principally scavengers. Most food items are taken either from the ground or from the water surface, though insects are sometimes captured in flight. Whistling kites are also known to pirate meals from ibises and herons and from other raptors, and to force large waterbirds to regurgitate their catches. They regularly patrol roads in search of roadkill, and hover over the edges of grass fires in search of potential prey fleeing the flames, sometimes carrying burning sticks and dropping them on unburnt areas. When food is scarce they will almost entirely rely on finding carrion.

=== Breeding ===
The whistling kite's nest is a bulky platform made of sticks and lined with green leaves, placed in an upright fork of a tall tree—often a eucalypt or pine in a riparian area. Pairs often re-use the same nest year after year, annually adding material until the platform becomes quite large. Females normally lay 2–3 bluish-white eggs, which are sometimes covered with reddish-brown blotches; clutches of 1–4 eggs have been recorded. Eggs are incubated for 35–40 days, and the species is reported to have a 60% hatching success. Chicks, which are covered with cream- or buff-colored down feathers, spend 44–54 days in the nest before fledging, and are dependent on their parents for a further 6–8 weeks after leaving the nest. In Australia, the birds generally breed between June and October in the south, and between February and May in the north, though they may nest at any time after rain providing there are adequate food supplies.

Gold Coast, SE Queensland
