= Herbert Thomas Condon =

Australian museum curator and ornithologist

Herbert Thomas Condon (27 February 1912 – 12 January 1978) was an Australian museum curator and ornithologist. He was born in Melbourne and attended the University of Adelaide. In 1929, Condon joined the scientific staff of the South Australian Museum; he was promoted to Assistant in Zoology in 1935, and became Curator of Birds and Reptiles in 1938. He kept this position for the decades through to 1976, broken only by a period of war service with the RAAF.

Condon was Honorary Secretary of the South Australian Ornithological Association (SAOA) from 1938 to 1942, and was later editor of its journal, the South Australian Ornithologist from 1953 to 1964. He was also a member of the Royal Australasian Ornithologists Union (RAOU), serving as its President from 1961 to 1962; in addition, he was made a Fellow of the RAOU in 1973 and was Convener of the RAOU Checklist Committee for many years.

Apart from numerous published papers in journals, works he authored or coauthored include:

- Condon, H.T. (1949). Field Guide to the Hawks of Australia. Bird Observers Club: Melbourne. (Several editions).
- Condon, H.T.; & McGill, A.R. (1952). Field Guide to the Waders. Bird Observers Club: Melbourne. (Several editions).
- Condon, H.T. (1962). A Handlist of the Birds of South Australia, with Annotations. (SA Ornithologist Vol.23, Parts 6–8). SAOA: Adelaide.
- Condon, H.T. (1968). A Handlist of the Birds of South Australia. SAOA: Adelaide.
- Condon, H.T. (1975). Checklist of the Birds of Australia. Part 1: Non-Passerines. RAOU: Melbourne.
