= South Australian Ornithologist =

- Discipline: Ornithology
- Language: English
- Edited by: John Hatch

Publication details
- History: 1914–present
- Publisher: South Australian Ornithological Association (Australia)
- Frequency: Biannual

Standard abbreviations
- ISO 4: S. Aust. Ornithol.

Indexing
- ISSN: 0038-2973
- OCLC no.: 2578732

Links
- Journal homepage; Journal archives

The South Australian Ornithologist is the scientific journal of the South Australian Ornithological Association (also known as Birds SA). The journal was first published in 1914 and is usually issued twice a year to members of the association.

== See also ==
- List of ornithology journals
