= Adelaide Ornithologists Club =

The Adelaide Ornithologists' Club (AOC) was founded by Alan Lendon, a leading surgeon and prominent aviculturist, in 1960, as a breakaway group from the South Australian Ornithological Association, with John Neil McGilp as its first President. It followed dissension within the SAOA about the live bird export trade, in which the Adelaide Zoo was a leading player and Lendon a member of the Zoo Council. The AOC was formed with the explicit aim of promoting the study of birds. The pattern established in the early years and still maintained is that the club has an evening meeting and a Sunday outing each month except for December and January. Meetings typically include an address on a subject of relevance to ornithology, a section called bird notes devoted to recent sightings of interest, and "bird of the month", a section presented by a club member and offering a brief view of a particular bird species or bird family. Sunday outings visit local bird watching spots for identification in the field. Once a year there is a Spring Excursion for a week to an area further afield. Each year the club produces a magazine entitled "Bird Talk" with summaries of the outings and other articles about birds. The club welcomes new members. Its web site's URL is www.adelaideornithologists.com.
