= John Burton Cleland =

Naturalist, mycologist, ornitholis

John Cleland
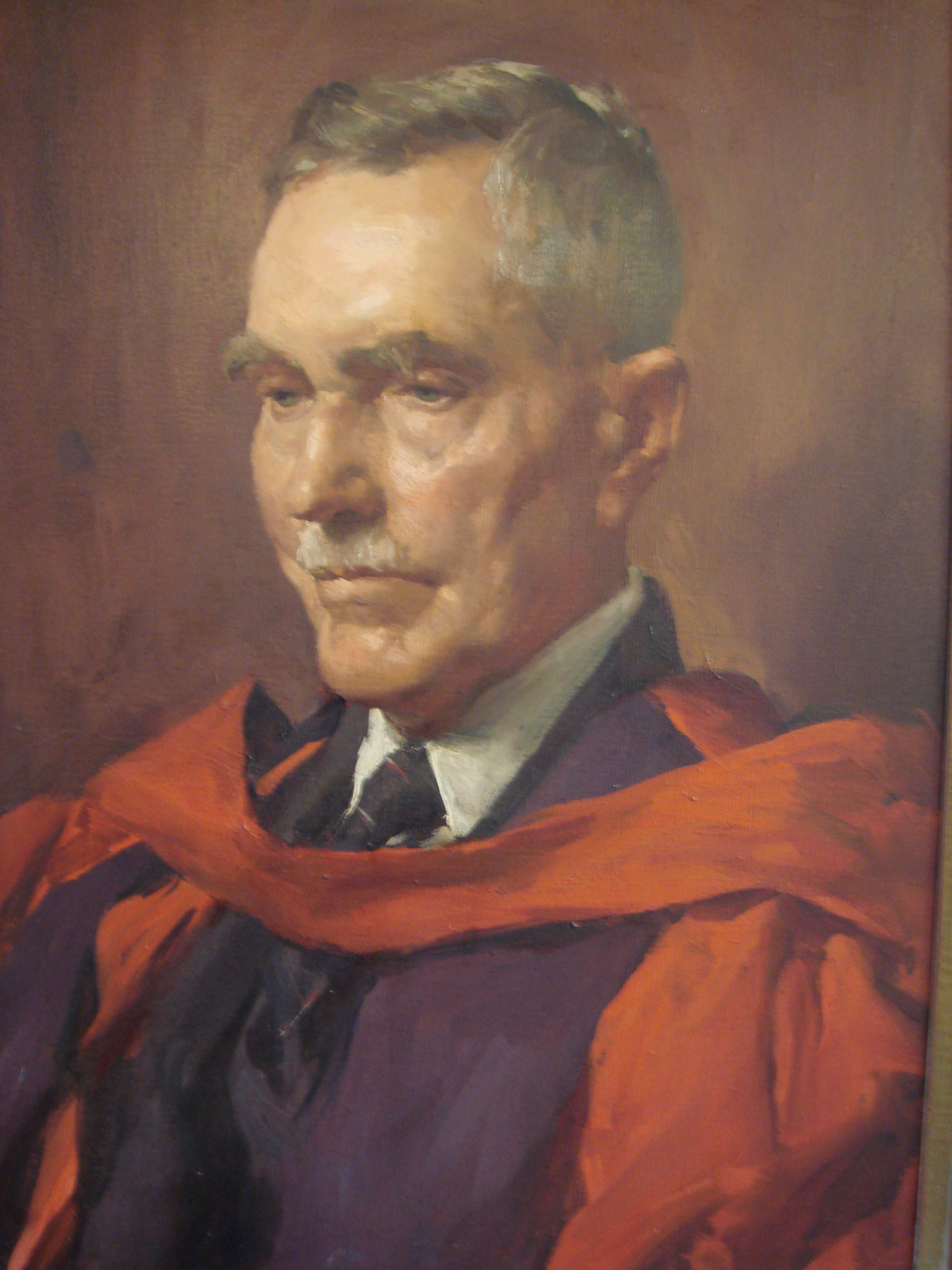
- Sir John Burton Cleland (1878—1971)
- Born: 22 June 1878; Norwood, Adelaide, Australia
- Died: 11 August 1971 (aged 93); Walkerville, Adelaide, Australia
- Education: University of Adelaide; University of Sydney
- Known for: Proof of transmission of dengue by mosquitoes
- Awards: Australian Natural History Medallion
- Scientific career
- Fields: Pathologist, naturalist, microbiologist, mycologist and ornithologist
- Workplaces: Royal Prince Alfred Hospital; University of Sydney; London Hospital; Bureau of Microbiology, Sydney; University of Adelaide
- Academic advisors: Ralph Tate; Edward Rennie; William Henry Bragg; Edward Stirling; Archibald Watson; Robert Muir
- Author abbrev. (botany): Cleland

Signature
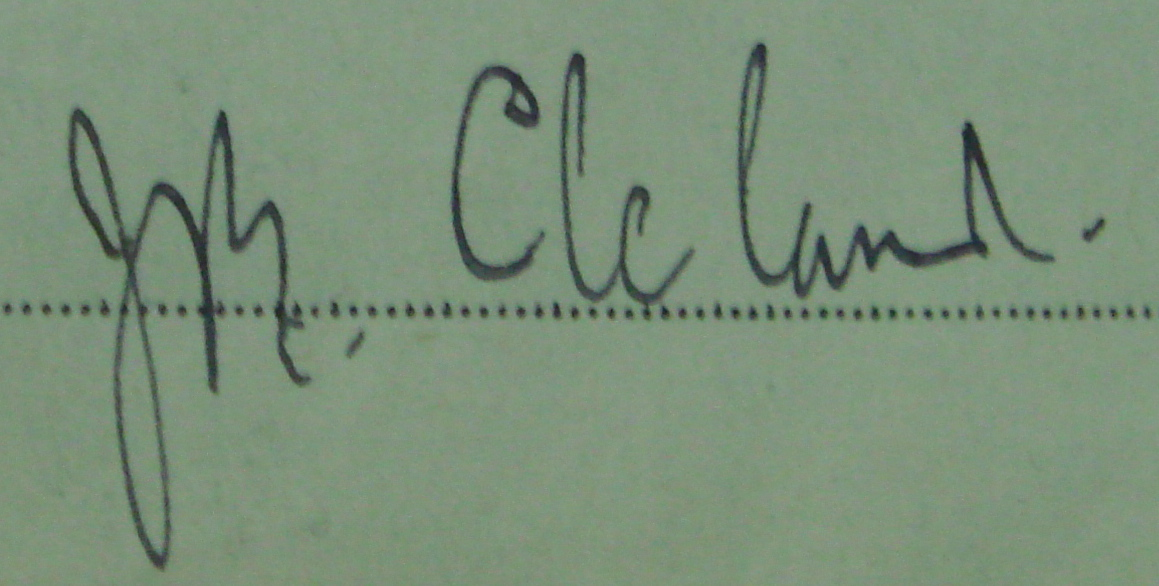

Notes
- He was the father of ornithologist Joan Paton.

Sir John Burton Cleland CBE (22 June 1878 – 11 August 1971) was an Australian naturalist, microbiologist, mycologist and ornithologist. He was Professor of Pathology at the University of Adelaide and was consulted on high-level police inquiries, such as the famous Taman Shud Case in 1948 and later. He also studied the transmission of dengue virus by the mosquito Stegomyia fasciata (Aedes aegypti).

== Early life and education ==
John Burton Cleland was born in Norwood, South Australia a grandson of John Fullerton Cleland and son of Dr William Lennox Cleland (1847–1918) and Matilda Lauder Cleland née Burton (1848–1928) a daughter of John Hill Burton FRSE. He attended Prince Alfred College and the universities of Adelaide and Sydney, graduating in medicine in 1900.

== Marriage and family ==
Cleland married Dora Isabel Paton (1880–1955) a daughter of Rev David Paton DD (1841–1907), minister of Chalmers Presbyterian Church, North Terrace, Adelaide, and Isabella Ann McGhie née Robson (1847–1933) and they had four daughters and a son. He encouraged them in the sciences:

- Dr Margaret Burton Cleland MRCS FRACP (1909–2004) who married Dr John Patrick Horan (1907–1993) MD FRCP FRACP;
- Dr William Paton 'Bill' Cleland MB FRCP FRCS (1912–2005), who married Norah Goodhart (1914–1994), became a cardio-thoracic surgeon;
- Joan Burton Cleland (c. 1915–2000) who married Erskine Norman Paton (1922–1985) became an ornithologist;
- Elizabeth Robson Cleland (16 October 1910 – 31 January 2005) married (Alfred) Moxon Simpson (1910–2001) on 3 August 1938. Moxon was a son of Alfred Allen Simpson. Elizabeth Simpson was author of The Hahndorf Walkers and The Clelands of Beaumont
- Barbara Burton Cleland (1913–?), a mathematics graduate who married Prof Andrew John La Nauze (1911–1990)

Sir Donald MacKinnon Cleland CBE (1901–1975), administrator of Papua New Guinea, was his cousin, the son of Elphinstone Davenport Cleveland (1843–1928) and his second wife Anne Emily MacKinnon (1870–1944).

== Career ==
He worked as a microbiologist in Western Australia and New South Wales for several years. He was appointed as a full Professor of Pathology at the University of Adelaide, and taught generations of students.

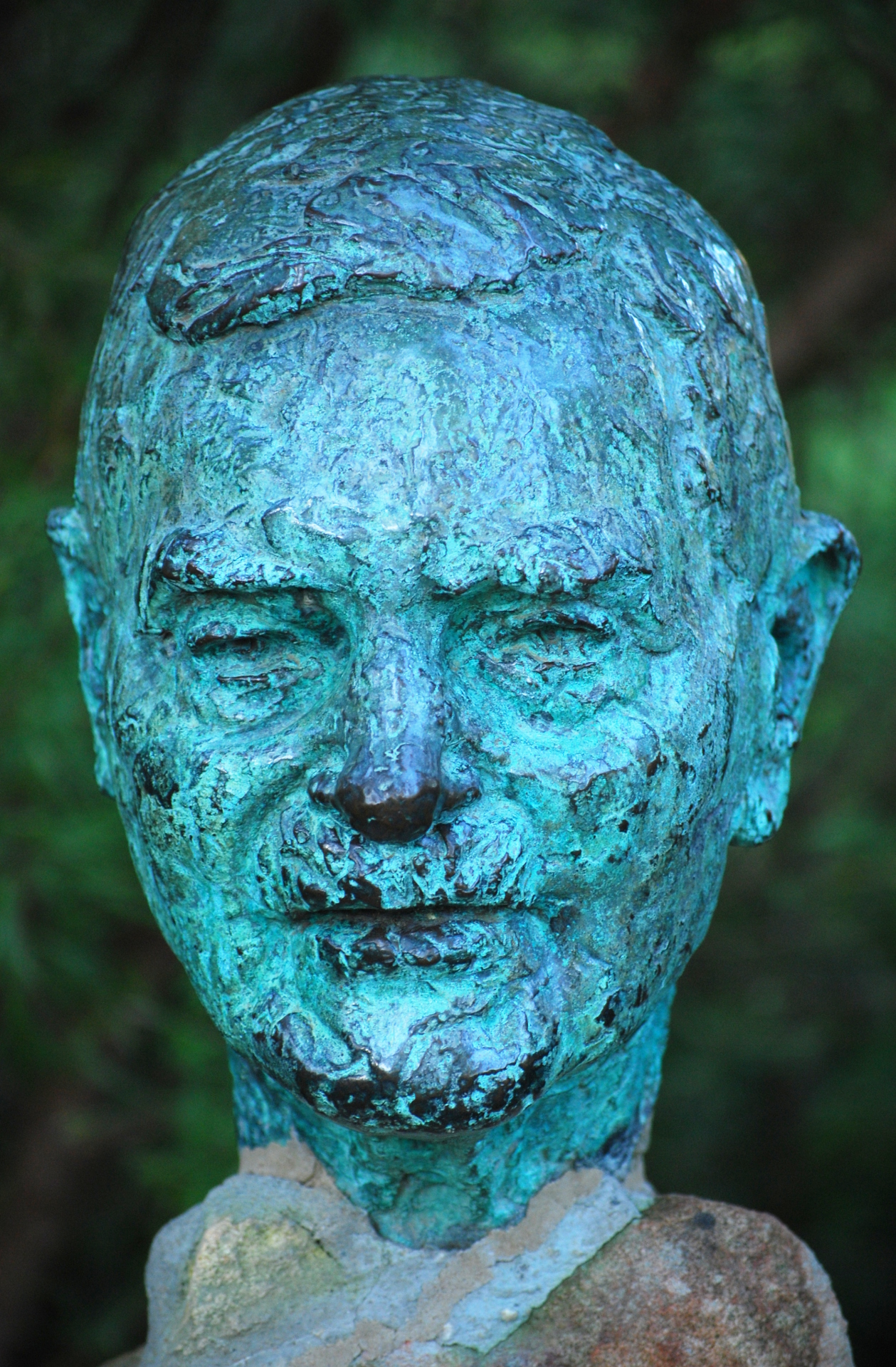
Bust of Sir John Burton Cleland in Cleland Wildlife Park

Cleland was elected President of the Royal Society of South Australia 1927–1928, and again in 1941. He became a member of the Royal Australasian Ornithologists Union (RAOU) in 1902, and served as its President 1935–1936.

In 1934–35, he published a two-volume monograph on the fungi of South Australia, one of the most comprehensive reviews of Australian fungi to date.

Along with Charles Duguid and Constance Cooke, he was a board member of South Australia's Aborigines Protection Board after its creation in 1940, established by the Aborigines Act Amendment Act (1939) and "charged with the duty of controlling and promoting the welfare" of Aboriginal people.

Cleland led a University of Adelaide anthropological expedition to Nepabunna Mission in the northern Flinders Ranges in May 1937, whose members included Charles P. Mountford as ethnologist and photographer, botanist Thomas Harvey Johnston, virologist Frank Fenner, and others.

Cleland was the pathologist on the infamous Taman Shud Case, in which an unidentified man was discovered dead on a beach 1 December 1948. While Cleland theorised that the man had been poisoned, he found no trace of it. The man was never identified.

Cleland became increasingly interested in wildlife conservation and served as commissioner of the Belair National Park in 1928 and as chairman in 1936–65. He chaired the Flora and Fauna Handbooks Committee of South Australia, and with them oversaw the production of a series of descriptive biological manuals, and other books related to flora, fauna and geology.

== Legacy and honours ==
- 1949, he was elected an Honorary Life Member of the RAOU.
- 1952, he was awarded the Australian Natural History Medallion.
- 1963, he is commemorated by the Cleland Wildlife Park (now within Cleland National Park).
- The J.B. Cleland Kindergarten in St Georges, South Australia is also named after him.

== See also ==
- List of mycologists
- Fungi of Australia
- Category:Taxa named by John Burton Cleland
