= Frederic Wood Jones =

British anatomist and anthropologist

Wood Jones
- Born: Frederic Wood Jones; 23 January 1879
- Died: 29 September 1954 (aged 75)
- Awards: Mueller Medal (1926); Clarke Medal (1941); Fellow of the Royal Society
- Scientific career
- Workplaces: London School of Medicine for Women; University of Adelaide; University of Hawaiʻi at Mānoa; University of Melbourne; University of Manchester; Royal College of Surgeons of England

Frederic Wood Jones FRS (January 23, 1879 – September 29, 1954), usually referred to as Wood Jones, was a British observational naturalist, embryologist, anatomist and anthropologist, who spent considerable time in Australia.

== Biography ==
Jones was born in London, England, and wrote extensively on early humans, including their arboreal adaptations (Arboreal Man), and was one of the founding fathers of the field of modern physical anthropology. A friend of Le Gros Clark, Wood Jones was also known for his controversial belief in the view that acquired traits could be inherited, and thus his opposition to Darwinism. He taught anatomy and physical anthropology at London School of Medicine for Women, University of Adelaide, University of Hawaiʻi at Mānoa, University of Melbourne, University of Manchester and the Royal College of Surgeons of England.

Jones was elected a Fellow of the Zoological Society of London (FZS) in 1903. He was president of the Royal Society of South Australia in 1927, and was awarded the RM Johnston Memorial Medal by The Royal Society of Tasmania in 1925, the Mueller Medal by the Australian and New Zealand Association for the Advancement of Science in 1926, and the Clarke Medal by the Royal Society of New South Wales in 1941. He was elected President of the Anatomical Society of Great Britain and Ireland for 1943 to 1945.

In 1910 in London, he married Gertrude Clunies-Ross, the fourth daughter of George Clunies-Ross. She was subsequently a Fellow of the Zoological Society of London and only the second woman to be the society's librarian.

== Tarsian hypothesis ==
"Wood Jones, prior to the 1930s, promoted that the human line evolved from a very generalized primate from which avoided going through a hominoid ape stage. His tradition of interpretation... the human line avoided altogether the hominoid phase of evolution... [common] ancestor was conceived to be tarsoid-like form... the rise of the bipedal posture in humans was not believed to have been preceded by a brachiation or a pre-brachiation phase."

Jones favoured a long separate, non-anthropoid ancestry for humans. He believed that science should search as far back as the primitive tarsioid stock to find a sufficiently generalised form that would be the common ancestor of man, monkeys and the anthropoid apes. The tarsian hypothesis of Jones, which he held to from 1918 until his death, claimed that the human line of development did not diverge from that of apes or monkeys but from much earlier, before the Oligocene 30 million years ago, from a common ancestor with a primitive primate group of which the only other survivor is the Tarsier. Wood Jones in his The Ancestry Of Man (1923) described his Tarsian hypothesis as follows:

"The thesis then put forward was that the general notion that Man had evolved along the line of the Linnean Classification was wrong. Far from the Lemurs, the Monkeys, and the Anthropoid Apes being landmarks upon the line of human progress, it was contended that the human stock arose from a Tarsioid form, that the Lemurs were not ancestors of the Tarsioids and that the Monkeys and Apes were more specialised away from the Tarsioids than was Man himself, and, therefore, were not his ancestors, but rather his collateral descendants from a former assemblage of animals, of which we have only one direct living descendant, in the form of Tarsius spectrum."

Wood Jones explained common structural features between Man and the apes (and monkeys) through convergent evolution. In 1948 he wrote:

"If the primate forms immediately ancestral to the human stock are ever to be revealed, they will be utterly unlike the slouching ‘ape men’ of which some have dreamed and of which they have made casts and pictures during their waking hours."

== Philosophy ==
Jones rejected organised religion and idea of an anthropomorphic deity. He believed there was a cosmic mind behind nature. He defended the holistic philosophy of Jan Smuts and was a strong critic of Darwinism. His philosophical views are discussed in his book Design and Purpose (1942).

== Publications ==
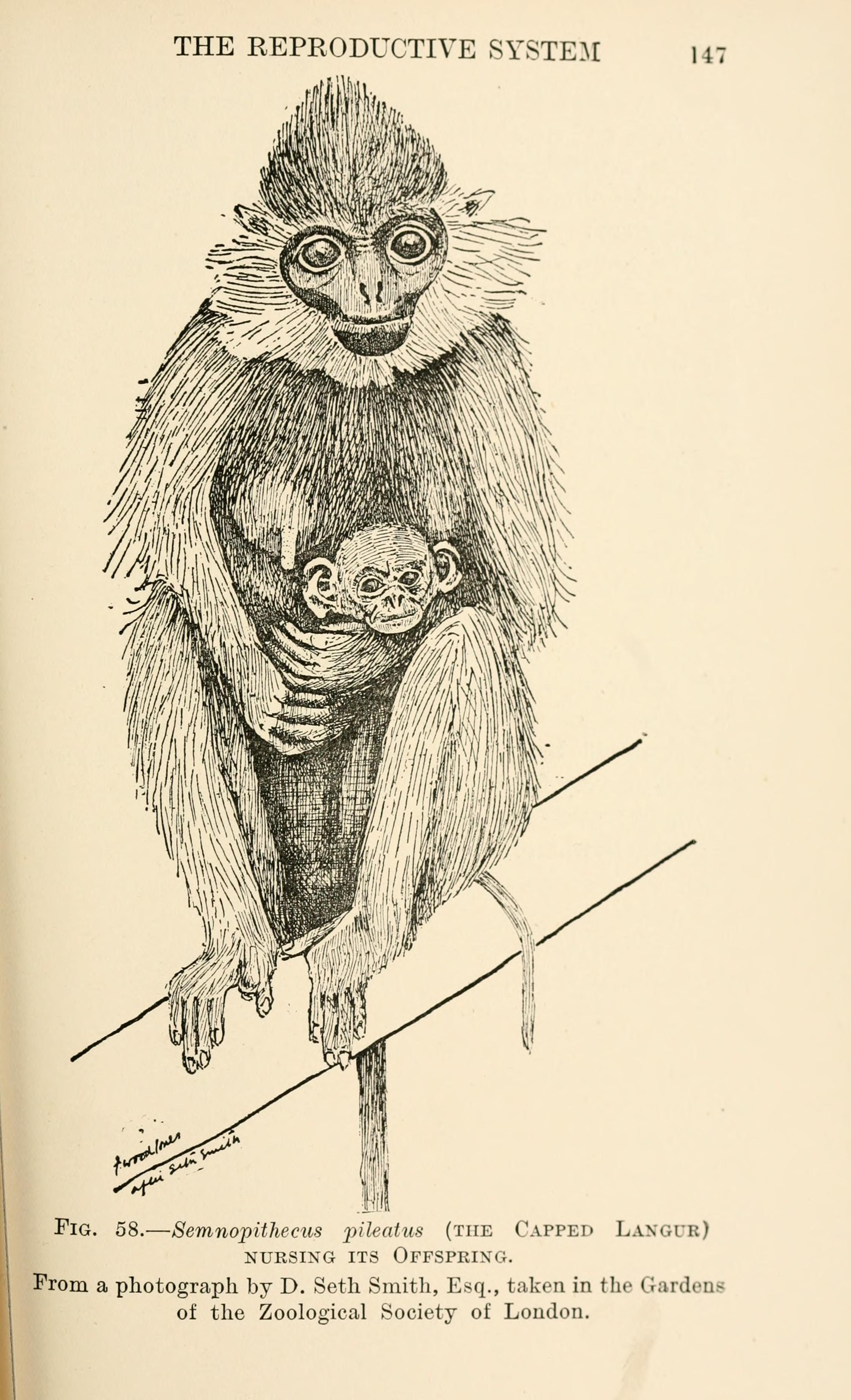
Arboreal Man (1916)

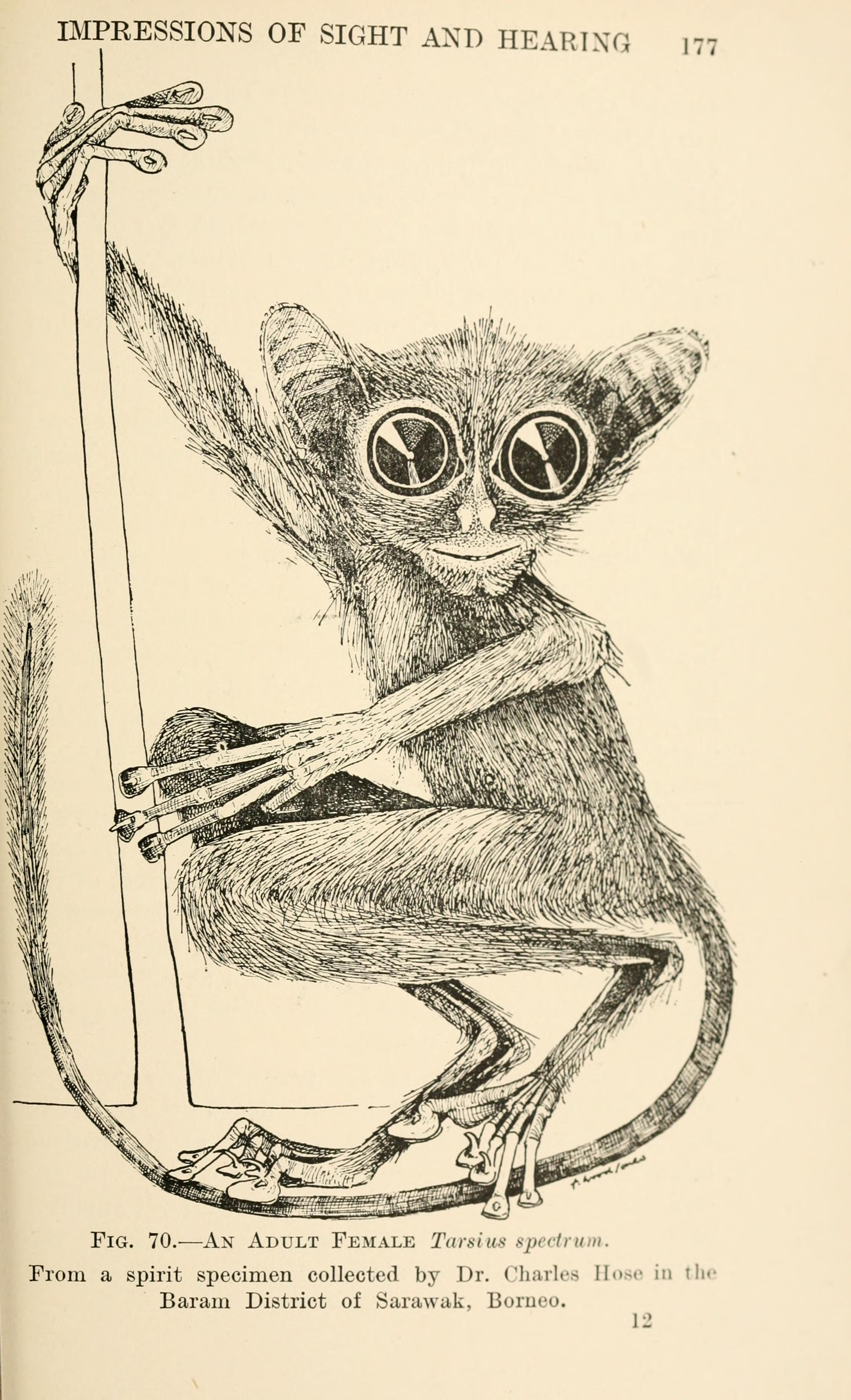
Arboreal Man (1916)

As well as numerous scientific papers, books he authored, coauthored and edited include:

- 1912: Coral and Atolls: A History and Description of the Keeling-Cocos Islands, with an account of their Fauna and Flora, and a Discussion of the Method of Development and Transformation of Coral Structures in General, Lovell, Reeve & Co Ltd: London.
- 1916: Arboreal Man, Edward Arnold: London.
- 1918: The Problem of Man's Ancestry, Society for Promoting Christian Knowledge.
- 1920: The Principles of Anatomy as Seen in the Hand, J. & A. Churchill: London.
- 1923: Douglas Price Memorial Lecture, No.3: The Ancestry Of Man, R G. Gilles & Co.: Brisbane.
- 1923: The Position of Anatomy in the Modern Medical Curriculum and the Conception of Cytoclesis, Hassell Press: Adelaide.
- 1923: Unscientific Essays, Edward Arnold & Co: London.
- 1923: Handbooks of the Flora and Fauna of South Australia: The Mammals of South Australia. Part I: The Monotremes and the Carnivorous Marsupials, Government Printer: Adelaide.
- 1924: Handbooks of the Flora and Fauna of South Australia: The Mammals of South Australia. Part II: The Bandicoots and the Herbivorous Marsupials, Government Printer: Adelaide.
- 1925: Handbooks of the Flora and Fauna of South Australia: The Mammals of South Australia. Part III: The Monodelphia, Government Printer: Adelaide.
- 1929: Man's Place Among the Mammals. Edward Arnold: London.
- 1934: Sea Birds Simplified, Edward Arnold & Co.: London.
- 1934, Unscientific Excursions, Edward Arnold & Co: London.
- 1939: Life and Living, Kegan Paul: London.
- 1942: Design and Purpose, Kegan Paul: London.
- 1943: Habitat and Heritage, Kegan Paul, Trench, Trubner: London.
- 1946: Structure and Function as Seen in the Foot, Bailliere Tindall and Cox: London.
- 1946: The Principles of Anatomy as Seen in the Hand, Bailliere Tindall and Cox: London.
- 1948: Hallmarks of Mankind, Bailliere Tindall and Cox: London.
- 1953, Trends of Life, Edward Arnold: London.
- 1946: Jones, Frederic Wood (ed.), Buchanan's Manual of Anatomy. Bailliere Tindall and Cox: London.
- 1929: Jones, Frederic Wood & Porteus, Stanley D., The Matrix of the Mind, Edward Arnold & Co.: London.

== See also ==
- The Australian Journal of Experimental Biology and Medical Science

Awards
Preceded by Carl Süssmilch	Clarke Medal; 1941	Succeeded by William Rowan Browne
