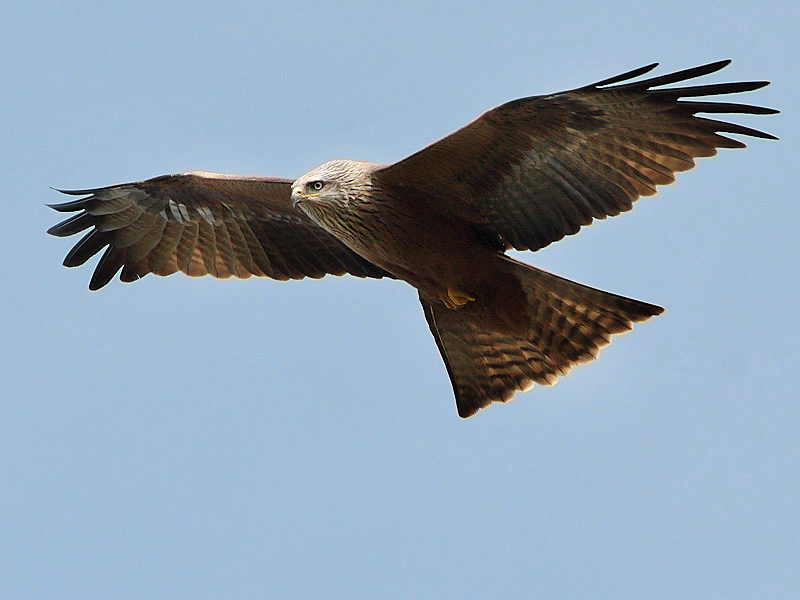
- Black kite, (Milvus migrans)

Scientific classification
- Kingdom: Animalia
- Phylum: Chordata
- Class: Aves
- Order: Accipitriformes
- Family: Accipitridae
- Subfamily: Buteoninae
- Genus: Milvus; Lacépède, 1799

Type species
- Falco milvus Linnaeus, 1758

Species
- See text for discussion

= Milvus =

Genus of bird

Milvus is a genus of medium-sized birds of prey. The genus was erected by the French naturalist Bernard Germain de Lacépède in 1799 with the red kite as the type species. The name is the Latin word for the red kite.

The genus Milvus has in the past been placed in the subfamily Milvinae but molecular phylogenetic studies have shown that such a grouping is polyphyletic for Buteoninae. It is now placed in the subfamily Buteoninae.

== Species ==
The genus contains three species.

Genus Milvus – Linnaeus, 1758 – three species
Common name	Scientific name and subspecies	Range	Size and ecology	IUCN status and estimated population
Red kite	Milvus milvus (Linnaeus, 1758) Two subspecies: M. m. milvus (Linnaeus, 1758) – Europe and northwest Africa to the Middle East; M. m. fasciicauda Hartert, 1914 – Cape Verde Islands	Western Europe and northwest Africa	Size: Habitat: Diet:	LC
Black kite	Milvus migrans (Boddaert, 1783) Five subspecies: M. m. migrans – (Boddaert, 1783); M. m. lineatus – (J.E. Gray, 1831); M. m. govinda – Sykes, 1832; M. m. affinis – Gould, 1838; M. m. formosanus – Kuroda, 1920	Eurasia and parts of Australasia and Oceania	Size: Habitat: Diet:	LC
Yellow-billed kite	Milvus aegyptius (Gmelin, JF,, 1788) Two subspecies: M. a. aegyptius - (Gmelin, JF, 1788); M. a. parasitus - (Daudin, 1800)	Sub-Saharan Africa including Madagascar, except for the Congo Basin with intra-African migrations (range marked in light green on map)	Size: Habitat: Diet:	LC

Allozyme data indicates that the genetic diversity in both black and red kites is rather low. Successful hybridization between Milvus kites is fairly commonplace, making mtDNA analyses unreliable to resolve the genus' phylogeny. Furthermore, there is no good correlation between molecular characters and biogeography and morphology in the red kite due to very incomplete lineage sorting.

The yellow-billed kite is apparently a separate species, as indicated by mtDNA phylogeny showing two supported clades, biogeography, and morphology. The black-eared kite is somewhat distinct morphologically, but is better considered a well-marked parapatric subspecies. The status of the Cape Verde kite is in doubt; while not a completely monophyletic lineage according to mtDNA data, it is still best regarded as a distinct species. Whatever its status, this population is extinct.

A prehistoric kite from the Early Pleistocene (1.8 million–780,000 years ago) deposits at Ubeidiya (Israel) was described as Milvus pygmaeus.
