= Archibald Watson (surgeon) =

Australian surgeon (1849–1940)

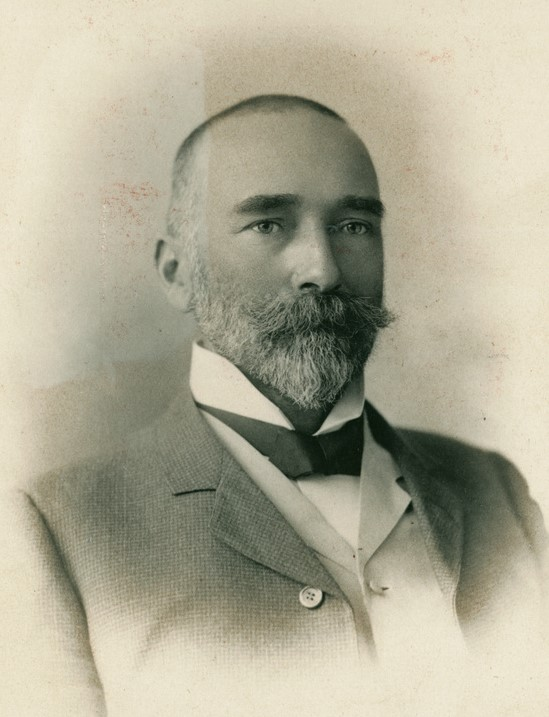
- Born: Archibald Watson; July 27, 1849; Tarcutta, New South Wales, Australia
- Died: July 30, 1940 (aged 91); Thursday Island, Australia
- Education: University of Göttingen; University of Paris

Archibald Watson FRCS (27 July 1849 – 30 July 1940) was an Australian surgeon and professor of anatomy at the University of Adelaide.

== Early life ==
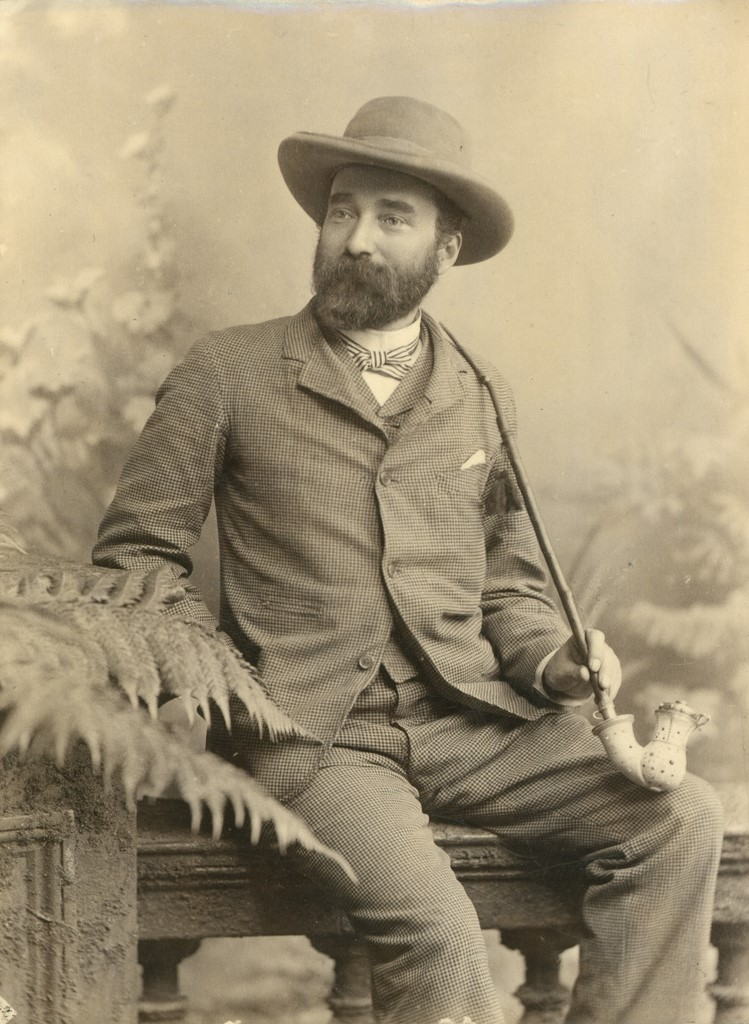

Watson was born at Tarcutta, New South Wales, to Sydney Grandison Watson. He was educated at a national school in Sydney and then Scotch College, Melbourne 1861–67, where he was a champion light-weight boxer.

== Career ==
Watson met Baron Ferdinand von Mueller and was advised to take up a scientific career, Watson went to Europe to study medicine, obtaining the degrees of M.D., University of Göttingen, M.D., University of Paris, and F.R.C.S., England.

In 1883 he went to Egypt as surgeon with Hicks Pasha's Sudan force, and in 1885 became first Elder professor of anatomy at the newly founded medical school at Adelaide.

(showing an early interest in biological means of controlling the rabbit pest),

During this time, he was also responsible for the collection of human remains of Indigenous Australians, some of which were shipped to overseas institutions. (In the 21st century, the Museum started pursuing an active policy of repatriation and reburial of these remains.)

== Late life ==
Watson lived on Thursday Island where died on 30 July 1940, three days after turning 91. He was unmarried. He is commemorated by a memorial lecture at the invitation of the Royal Australasian College of Surgeons. His portrait (by William Beckwith McInnes) hangs in the Adelaide University's anatomy department.
