= South Australian Ornithological Association =

The South Australian Ornithological Association (SAOA), also known as Birds SA, is an Australian birding organisation based in Adelaide, South Australia. The SAOA publishes a journal, the South Australian Ornithologist as well as the Birds SA Newsletter "the Birder". It holds regular monthly meetings and conducts field trips for members. It is also involved in many conservation projects throughout South Australia to help protect local bird species and their habitats.

== History ==
The SAOA was founded in Adelaide in 1899 and is the oldest birding association in Australasia, pre-dating the founding of the Royal Australasian Ornithologists Union, now known as BirdLife Australia, by two years.

=== 1960 schism ===
A period of uncertainty occurred in the association in the late 1950s when issues relating to the taking of birds from the wild became a matter of concern to many members. This concern led ultimately to a split in the membership and the formation of the Adelaide Ornithologists which remains as a separate group in Adelaide although the original reason for the schism has long been forgotten. On one side were those who urged for greater legislative protection for rare avicultural species, such as parrots and finches. On the other were people, including many aviculturists, who felt threatened by a proposal they saw would bring greater control over their hobby – and for those in the avicultural trade, their livelihoods. Eventually, after three stacked meetings in which control of the association swung between one side and the other, a poll of the membership reflected the mood for enhanced protection and the avicultural lobby was defeated. Consequently, some members broke away from the SAOA and formed the Adelaide Ornithologists Club in 1960.

== Activities ==
The SAOA has over 800 members and holds monthly meetings at the Hawker Centre in the Waite Institute of the University of Adelaide. It also organises regular excursions to birding sites in South Australia and holds campouts at least twice a year. Many of Australia's leading ornithologists, including Richard Schodde, Leo Joseph, Lyn Pedler, Andrew Black and David Paton, started their careers with the SAOA and continue as important contributors to its work and interests. SAOA (Birds SA) is a member group of the Conservation Council of South Australia. Birds SA (SAOA) affiliated with BirdLife Australia (formerly RAOU) in March 2018, the aim is to collaborate on many conservation issues for Australian birds species and protection of their habitats, primarily in SA, but throughout Australia as well. Visit the Birds SA website for update information and about Birds SA today www.birdssa.asn.au
