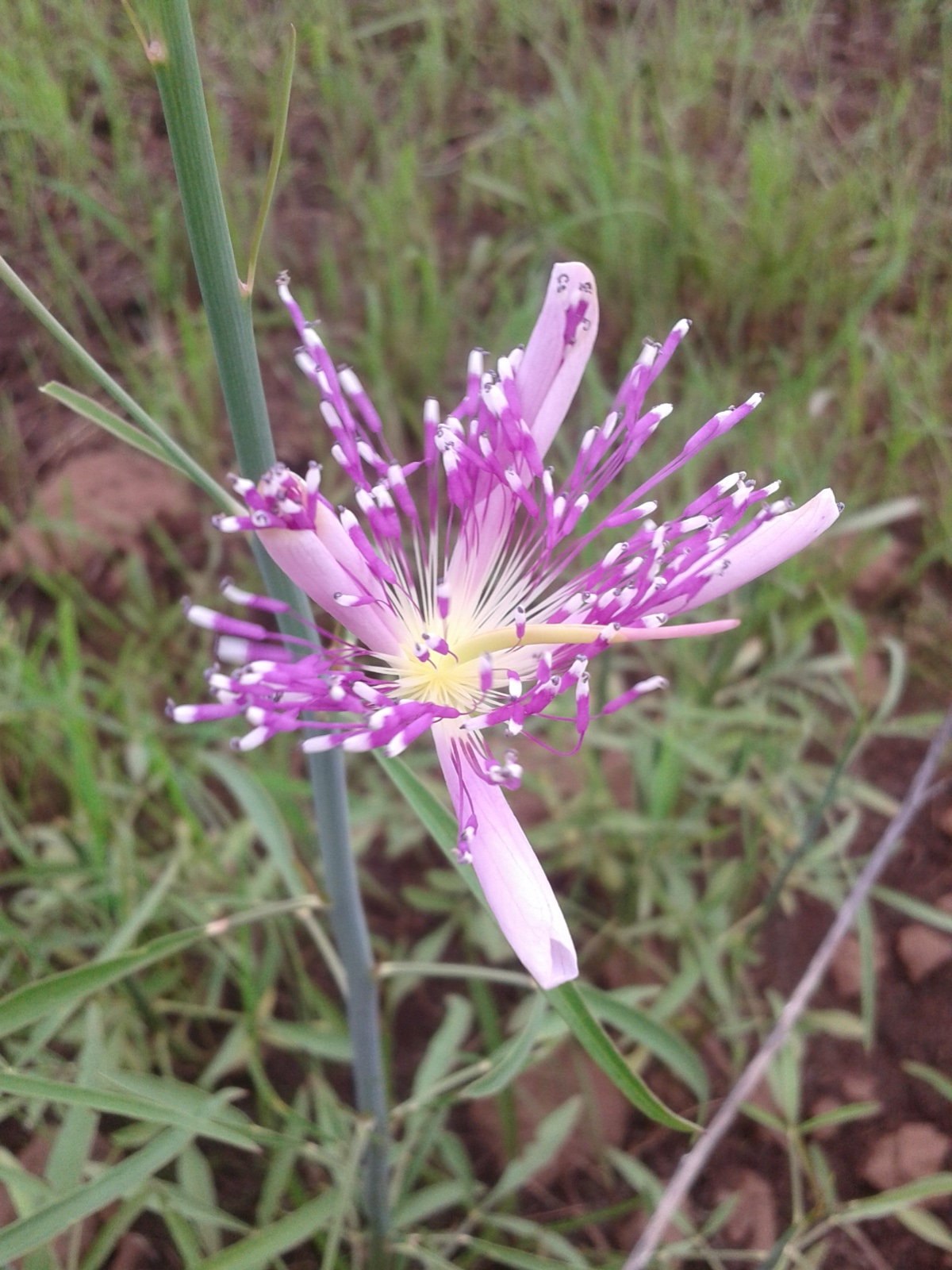

Scientific classification
- Kingdom: Plantae
- Clade: Tracheophytes
- Clade: Angiosperms
- Clade: Eudicots
- Clade: Rosids
- Order: Brassicales
- Family: Cleomaceae
- Genus: Cleome
- Species: C. elegans

Binomial name
- Cleome elegans (DC.) Schult. & Schult.f. (1829)

Synonyms
- Cleome schraderi Schult. & Schult.f. (1829), nom. superfl.; Corynandra angulata (DC.) R.Kr.Singh, Arigela & C.S.Reddy (2021); Corynandra elegans Chandore, U.S.Yadav & S.R.Yadav (2016); Corynandra pulchella Schrad. ex Spreng. (1827); Polanisia angulata DC. (1824); Polanisia heterophylla Wall. (1832), not validly publ.; Polanisia schraderi DC. (1826), nom. superfl.

= Cleome angulata =

Species of flowering plant

Cleome angulata, the elegant spider-flower, is a species of flowering plant in the family Cleomaceae. It is an annual native to western India and to Java. In western India it is found in the Konkan region of Maharashtra.
