= Cleome arenitensis =

Scientific classification
- Kingdom: Plantae
- Clade: Tracheophytes
- Clade: Angiosperms
- Clade: Eudicots
- Clade: Rosids
- Order: Brassicales
- Family: Cleomaceae
- Genus: Cleome
- Species: C. arenitensis

Binomial name
- Cleome arenitensis Craven, Lepschi & Fryxell

Species of flowering plant

Cleome arenitensis is a species of plant in the Cleomaceae family and is found in Western Australia.

It is found in a small area along the coast in the Kimberley region of Western Australia.
