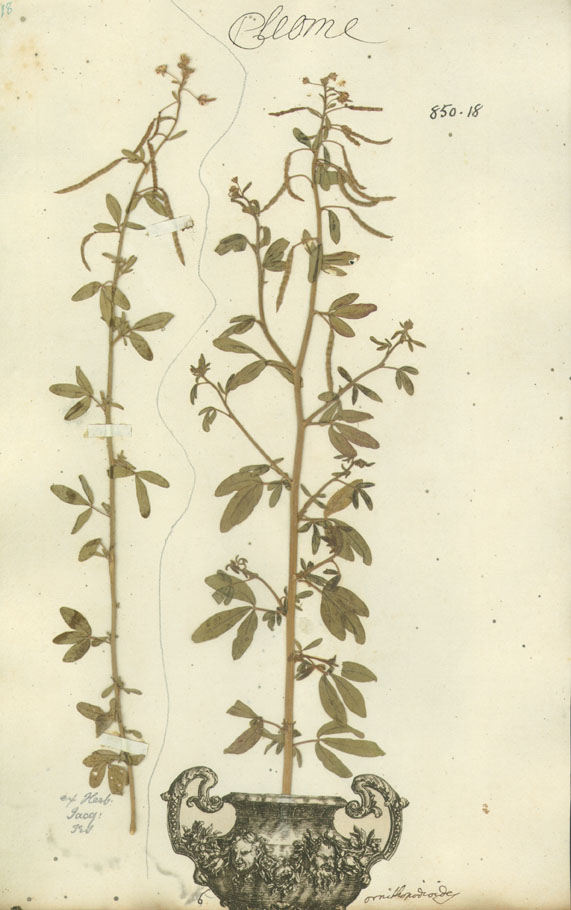
- bird spiderflower

Scientific classification
- Kingdom: Plantae
- Clade: Tracheophytes
- Clade: Angiosperms
- Clade: Eudicots
- Clade: Rosids
- Order: Brassicales
- Family: Cleomaceae
- Genus: Cleome
- Species: C. ornithopodioides

Binomial name
- Cleome ornithopodioides L.

= Cleome ornithopodioides =

Species of flowering plant

Cleome ornithopodioides or bird spiderflower is the type species of the genus Cleome which is part of the family Cleomaceae or Brassicaceae. The species epithet means "birds-foot like" (ornithopodi + oides).

== Description ==
Cleome ornithopodioides is an annual plant growing to a height of .3 m.

Flowers possess both male and female reproductive organs.

== Taxonomy ==
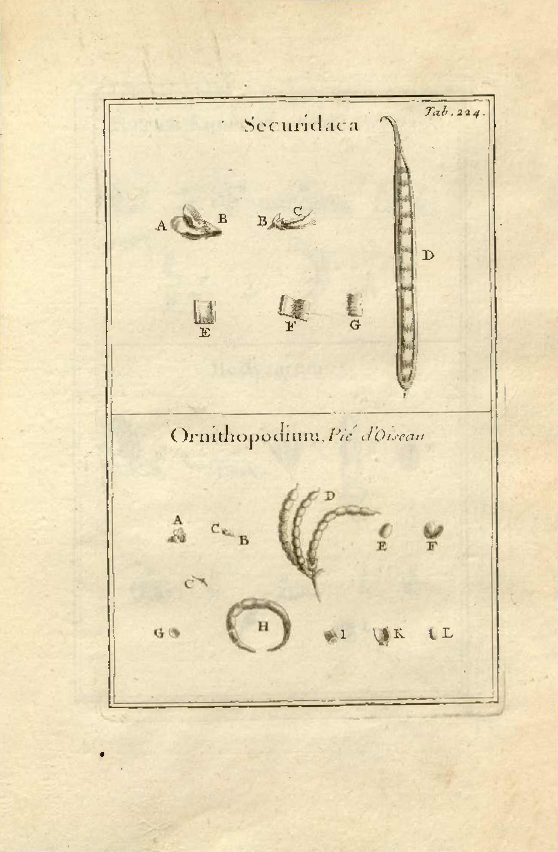
Illustration 1700

The first samples of bird spiderflower to arrive in Europe came from explorations of the area called the Levant and were successfully cultivated by James Sherard in 1732.

Joseph Pitton de Tournefort named the Claude Aubriet illustration of C. ornithopodioides Sinapistrum Orientale in the 1700 Institutiones rei herbariæ. Being named before the 1753 Species plantarum disqualifies the name from being considered to be a synonym.

When Carl Linnaeus first published this species with its current name in his 1753 Species plantarum he referenced descriptions of Sinapistrum Ornithopodiisiliquis found in Johann Christian Buxbaum's herbarium Plantarum minus cognitarum centuria, that was published posthumously by Johann Georg Gmelin in 1728, Johann Jacob Dillenius's 1732 Hortus Ethamensis. a collection whose list was published in 1907 by George Claridge Druce and also the description he wrote of Cleome ornithopodioides in his own Hortus Cliffortianus from 1737 and of Sinapestrum orientale triphyllum from his 1748 Hortus Upsaliensis.

In 1754 when Philip Miller described the genus Sinapistrum in The Gardeners Dictionary, he described the species with English words "Three-leav'd Eastern Sinapistrum, with Birds-foot-pods" and called it by the Latin name Sinapistrum Oriental triphyllum as it had been assigned by Tournefort who had described it before him.

== Ecology ==
Native to the area of the eastern Mediterranean, C. ornithopodioides was described in 1865 as living in the wild along with Trifolium stellatum in a fertile valley at the foot of Mount Serbal.

== Cultivation ==
Philip Miller wrote of the ease of cultivation of C. ornithopodioides in his 1754 The Gardeners Dictionary: "...will thrive in open Air; so the Seeds of this may be sown on a Bed of light Earth in April (late Spring), where the Plants are to remain; and will require no other Culture, but to keep them clear from Weeds: in June (early Summer) they will flower, and the Seeds will ripen in August (late Summer); and the Plants will soon after perish."
