= Cleome longipes =

Scientific classification
- Kingdom: Plantae
- Clade: Tracheophytes
- Clade: Angiosperms
- Clade: Eudicots
- Clade: Rosids
- Order: Brassicales
- Family: Cleomaceae
- Genus: Cleome
- Species: C. longipes

Binomial name
- Cleome longipes Lamb. ex DC.

Species of plant

Cleome longipes of the Capper family (Capparidaceae) is a shrub found in the dry tropics and rainforest clearings from Costa Rica to northern Peru. Its most interesting characteristic is its gynophore (stipe of a pistil), which can be up to six inches (15 centimeters) in length (exceeded only by Gigasiphon macrosiphon) bearing an equally long and very skinny seed pod. These all emerge from a tiny flower only one-twelfth inch (two millimeters) wide.
