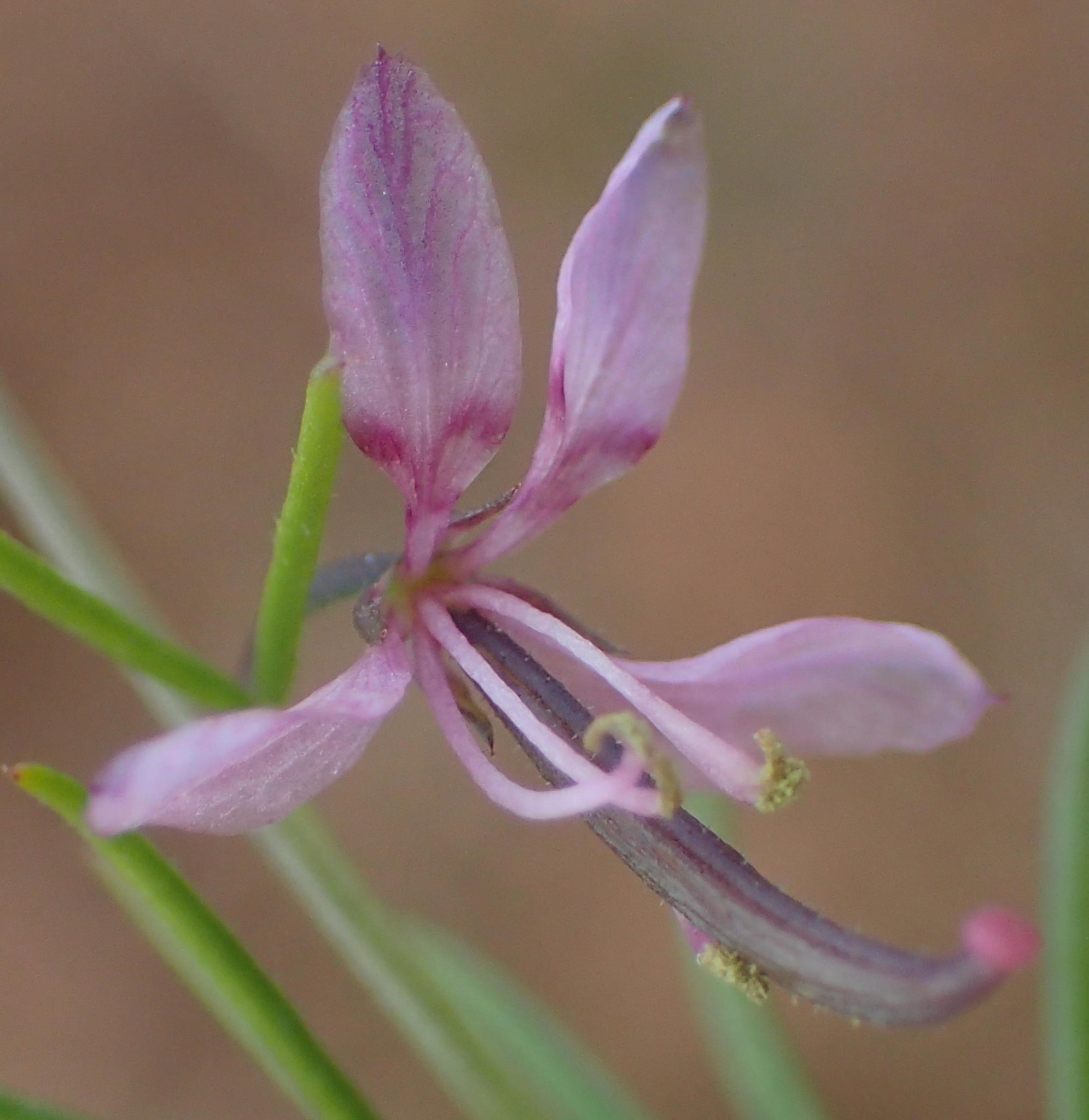

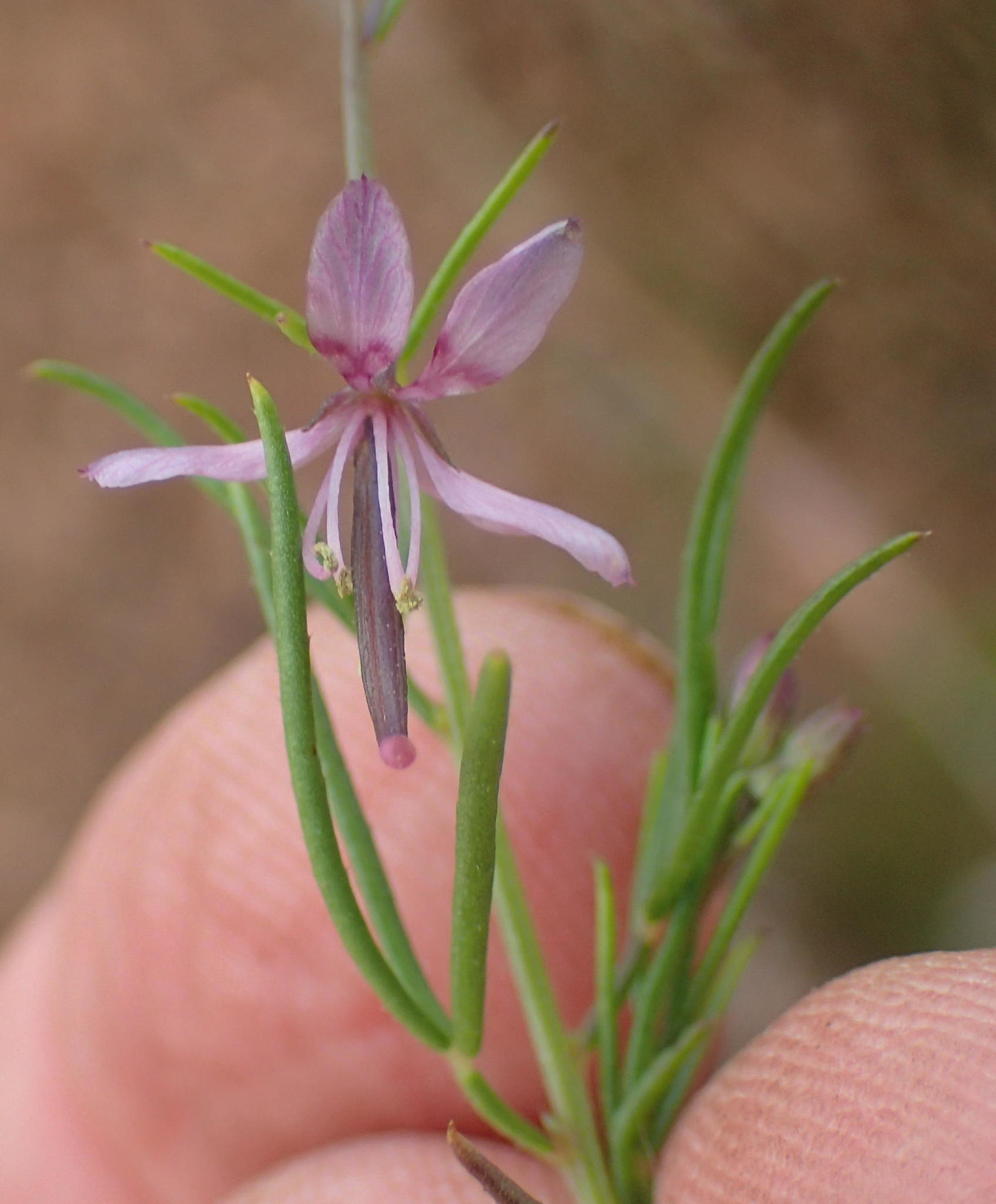

Conservation status
- Near Threatened (SANBI Red List)

Scientific classification
- Kingdom: Plantae
- Clade: Tracheophytes
- Clade: Angiosperms
- Clade: Eudicots
- Clade: Rosids
- Order: Brassicales
- Family: Cleomaceae
- Genus: Cleome
- Species: C. conrathii

Binomial name
- Cleome conrathii Burtt Davy

= Cleome conrathii =

Plant endemic to Northern South Africa

Cleome conrathii is a threatened species of plant endemic to the Northern Provinces of South Africa.

== Range and habitat ==
Cleome conrathii is found from Kuruman in the Northern Cape to Pretoria in Gauteng. It is found is bushveld and savanna habitat in red sandy soil on stony quartzite slopes.

== Conservation status ==
Cleome conrathii is listed as near threatened in the Red List of South African Plants due to only being found in 8 locations, with the added potential threat from urban expansion, competition from invasive alien plants, poor fire management, overgrazing of livestock, trampling and erosion.
