= Cleome tetrandra =

Scientific classification
- Kingdom: Plantae
- Clade: Tracheophytes
- Clade: Angiosperms
- Clade: Eudicots
- Clade: Rosids
- Order: Brassicales
- Family: Cleomaceae
- Genus: Cleome
- Species: C. tetrandra

Binomial name
- Cleome tetrandra DC.

Species of flowering plant

Cleome tetrandra is a species of plant in the Cleomaceae family and is found in Western Australia.

The annual herb has an erect to straggling habit and typically grows to a height of 15 to 60 centimetres (5.9 to 23.6 in). It blooms between January and July producing yellow flowers.

It is found along creeks and amongst sandstone outcrops on ridges throughout much of the Kimberley region of Western Australia growing in sandy soils.
