= Cleome kenneallyi =

Conservation status
- Priority Two — Poorly Known Taxa (DEC)

Scientific classification
- Kingdom: Plantae
- Clade: Tracheophytes
- Clade: Angiosperms
- Clade: Eudicots
- Clade: Rosids
- Order: Brassicales
- Family: Cleomaceae
- Genus: Cleome
- Species: C. kenneallyi

Binomial name
- Cleome kenneallyi Hewson

Species of flowering plant

Cleome kenneallyi is a species of plant in the Cleomaceae family and is found in Western Australia.

The perennial herb typically grows to a height of 0.6 metres (2 ft) and blooms between January and February producing yellow flowers.

It is found in among areas of sandstone in a small area along the coast in the Kimberley region of Western Australia.
