= Cleome cleomoides =

Justago

Scientific classification
- Kingdom: Plantae
- Clade: Tracheophytes
- Clade: Angiosperms
- Clade: Eudicots
- Clade: Rosids
- Order: Brassicales
- Family: Cleomaceae
- Genus: Cleome
- Species: C. cleomoides

Binomial name
- Cleome cleomoides (F.Muell.) Iltis

Species of flowering plant

Cleome cleomoides, commonly known as Justago, is a species of plant in the Cleomaceae family and is found in Western Australia.

The aromatic viscid, erect to spreading herb typically grows to a height of 0.3 to 1 metre (1 to 3 ft). It blooms between January and June producing yellow flowers.

It is found on sandstone ridges and outcrops throughout much of the Kimberley region of Western Australia where it grows in sandy soils.
