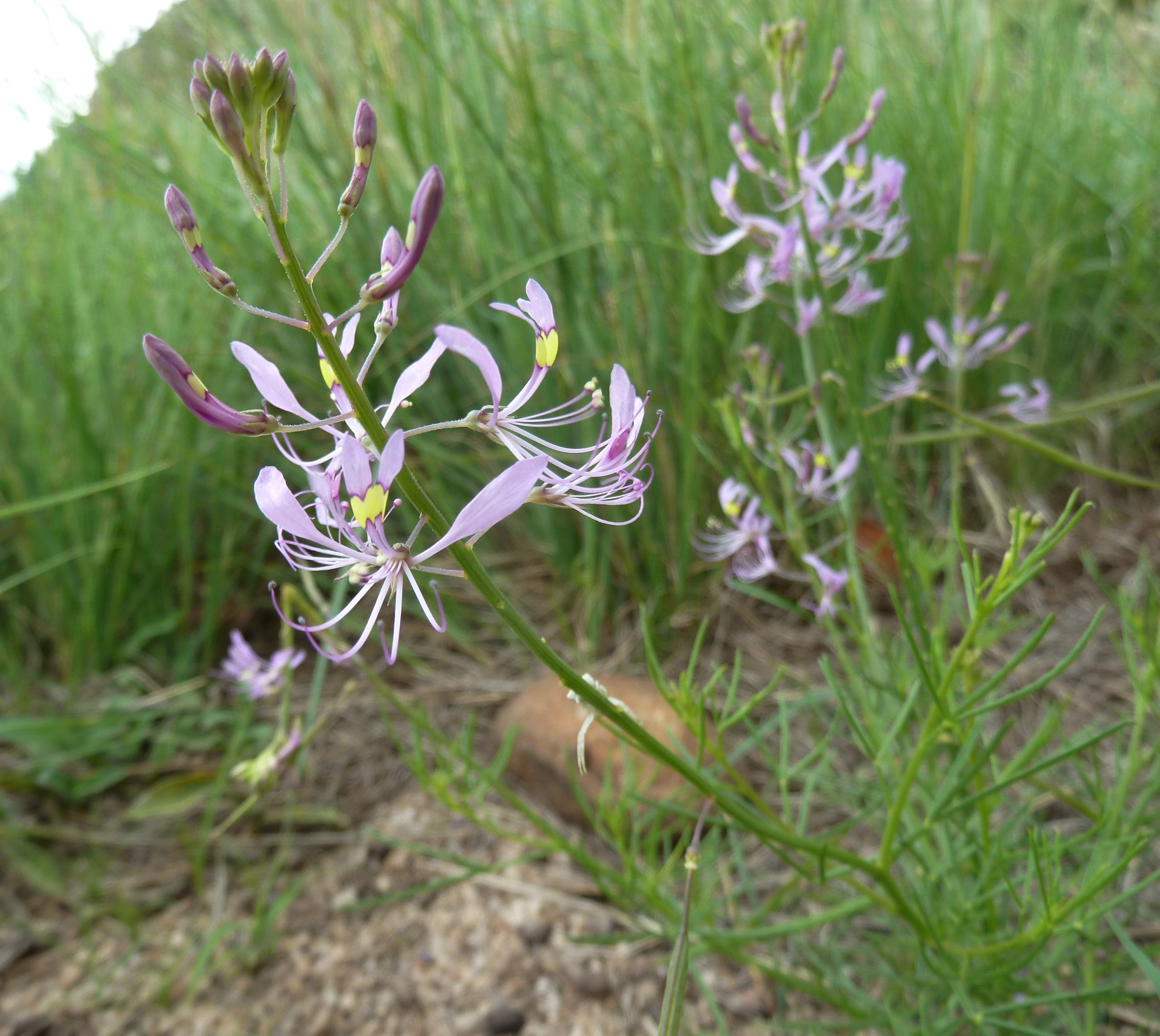

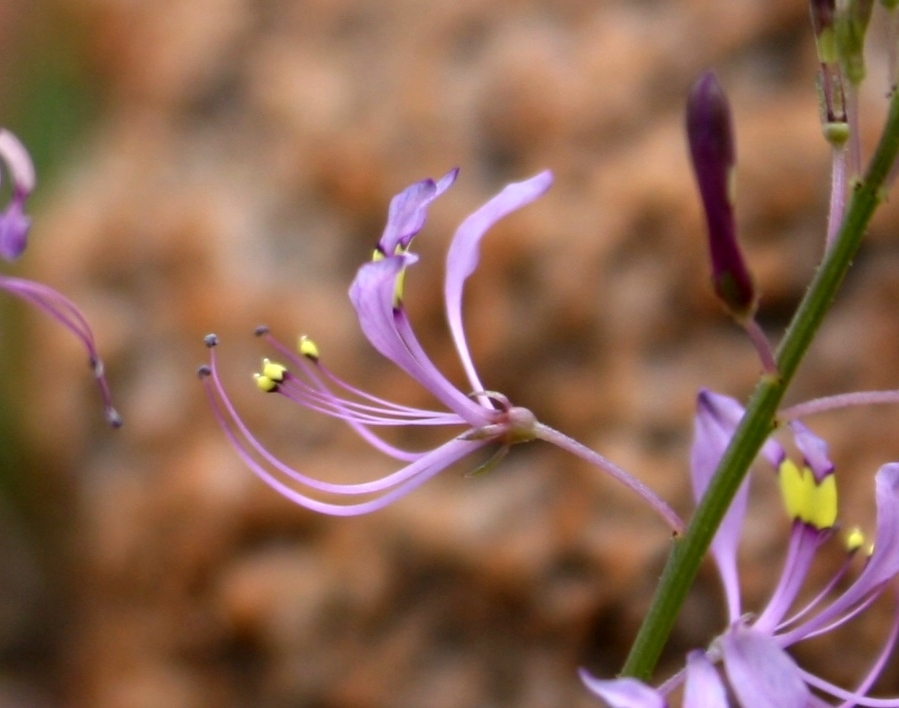

Scientific classification
- Kingdom: Plantae
- Clade: Tracheophytes
- Clade: Angiosperms
- Clade: Eudicots
- Clade: Rosids
- Order: Brassicales
- Family: Cleomaceae
- Genus: Cleome
- Species: C. maculata

Binomial name
- Cleome maculata (Sond.) Szyszył.

= Cleome maculata =

Species of flowering plant

Cleome maculata is a species of cleome that is native to southern Africa, where it occurs in sandy soils, especially in rocky habitats, and on slopes. It is a mostly annual plant, which is found in highveld regions of medium rainfall in South Africa, Botswana and Namibia. It is an erect and simple or branching plant, usually less than a foot tall, with sparse leaves. The linear leaflets are three to five compound. Two of the up-curved, mauve flower petals have a yellow mark at their center, which is bordered with dark purple. The long, up-curved stamens are tipped with bluish, knobby anthers. The fruit is a linear capsule. The species is a pioneer plant that may become a weed.
