= Cleome uncifera =

Scientific classification
- Kingdom: Plantae
- Clade: Tracheophytes
- Clade: Angiosperms
- Clade: Eudicots
- Clade: Rosids
- Order: Brassicales
- Family: Cleomaceae
- Genus: Cleome
- Species: C. uncifera

Binomial name
- Cleome uncifera Kers

Species of flowering plant

Cleome uncifera is a species of plant in the Cleomaceae family and is found in Australia.

The perennial herb or shrub has a viscid habit and typically grows to a height of 15 to 60 centimetres (5.9 to 23.6 in). It blooms between March and November producing yellow flowers.

It is found in North Western Australia
