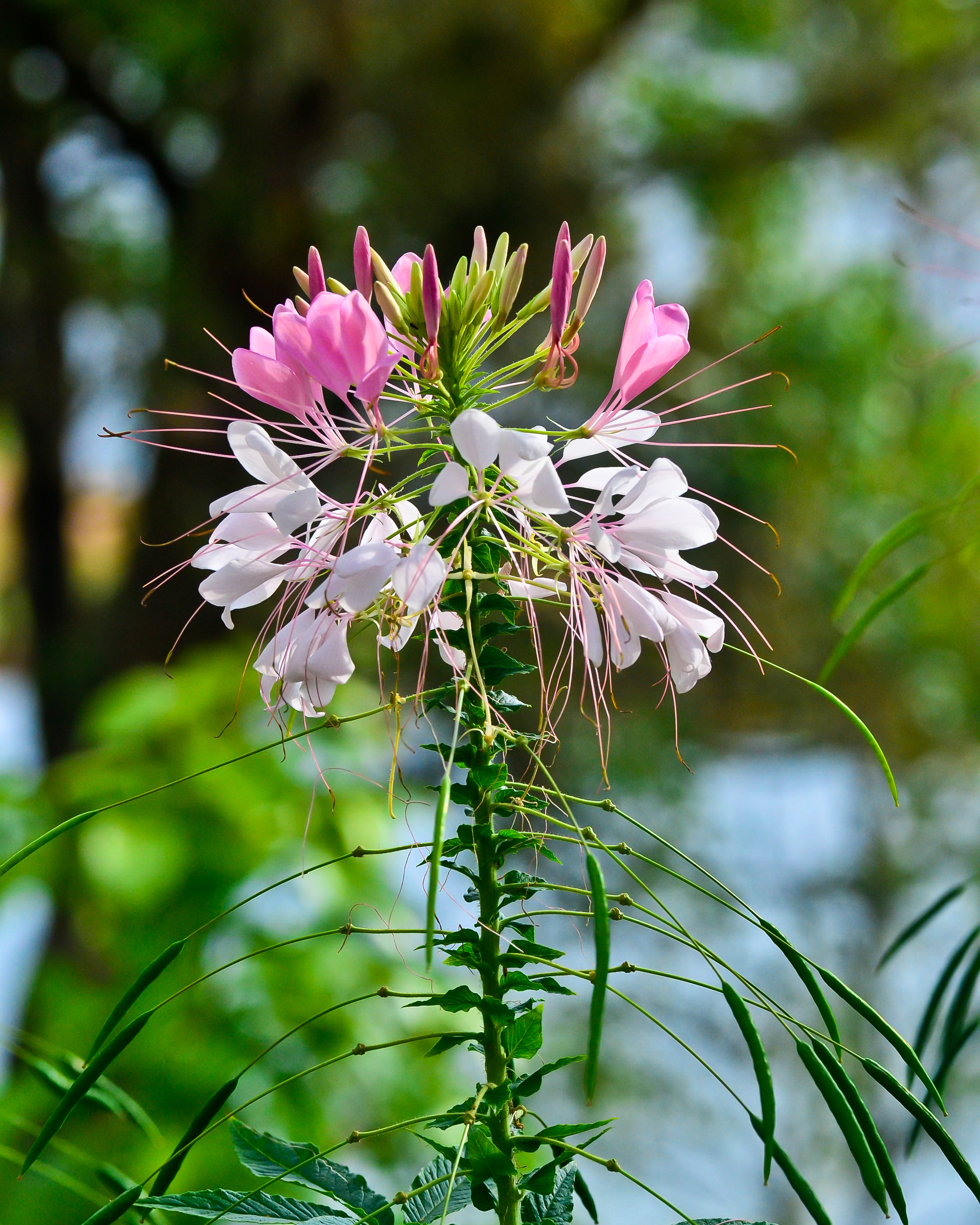
- Cleome houtteana

Scientific classification
- Kingdom: Plantae
- Clade: Tracheophytes
- Clade: Angiosperms
- Clade: Eudicots
- Clade: Rosids
- Order: Brassicales
- Family: Cleomaceae
- Genus: Cleome; L.

Synonyms
- List: Aldenella Greene; Andinocleome Iltis & Cochrane; Anomalostemon Klotzsch; Areocleome R.L.Barrett & Roalson; Arivela Raf.; Atalanta (Nutt.) Raf.; Aubion Raf.; Buhsea Bunge; Carsonia Greene; Celome Greene; Chilocalyx Klotzsch; Cleoserrata Iltis; Coalisina Raf.; Cochranella E.M.McGinty & Roalson (2020); Corynandra Schrad. ex Spreng.; Cristatella Nutt.; Cyrbasium Endl.; Dactylaena Schrad. ex Schult. & Schult.f. (1829); Decastemon Klotzsch; Dianthera Klotzsch; Diorimasperma Raf.; Dipterygium Decne.; Dispara Raf.; Gilgella Roalson & J.C.Hall; Gynandropsis DC.; Haptocarpum Ule; Hemiscola Raf.; Iltisiella Soares Neto & Roalson (2020); Isexina Raf.; Jacksonia Raf. ex Greene; Justago Kuntze; Kersia Roalson & J.C.Hall; Lagansa Rumph. ex Raf.; Melidiscus Raf.; Micambe Adans.; Mitostylis Raf.; Neocleome Small; Oncufis Raf.; Pedicellaria Schrank; Pericla Raf.; Physostemon Mart.; Podandrogyne Ducke; Podogyne Hoffmanns.; Polanisia Raf.; Pterocleome Iltis ex E.M.McGinty & Roalson (2020); Pteroloma Hochst. & Steud.; Puccionia Chiov.; Roeperia F.Muell.; Rorida J.F.Gmel.; Roridula Forssk.; Scolosperma Raf.; Sieruela Raf.; Siliquaria Forssk.; Sinapistrum Mill.; Stylidocleome Roalson & J.C.Hall; Stylista Raf.; Symphyostemon Klotzsch; Tarenaya Raf.; Tetratelia Sond.; Thulinella Roalson & J.C.Hall; Triandrophora O.Schwarz

= Cleome =

Genus of flowering plants

Cleome is a genus of flowering plants in the family Cleomaceae, commonly known as spider flowers, spider plants, spider weeds, or bee plants. Previously, it had been placed in the family Capparaceae, until DNA studies found the Cleomaceae genera to be more closely related to the Brassicaceae than the Capparaceae. Cleome and clammyweed (Polanisia dodecandra) can sometimes be confused.

The genus sensu stricto includes about 170 species of herbaceous annual or perennial plants and shrubs. The genus has a subcosmopolitan distribution throughout the tropical and warm temperate regions of the world. However, a recent DNA study failed to separate Cleome, Podandrogyne, and Polanisia from each other, so some taxonomists have abandoned the last two of these genera, treating them as part of Cleome sensu lato; in this case, Cleome contains about 275 species, the vast majority of the Cleomaceae.

The genus contains species which show an evolutionary progression from C_{3} to C_{4} photosynthesis. This, combined with it being very close to the Brassicaceae with the model plant species Arabidopsis thaliana, makes it an ideal genus in which to study the evolution of C_{4} photosynthesis. Morphological differences that demonstrate the transition from C_{3} to C_{4} include C_{3} species having leaves with more veins and larger bundle sheath cells. Also, species such as Cleome gynandra produce proteins needed for C_{4} photosynthesis. Three species independently acquired the C_{4} pathway, while others are C_{3}–C_{4} intermediate or C_{4}-like.

== Species ==
199 species are accepted.

- Cleome aculeata L. – tropical
- Cleome africana Botsch.
- Cleome afrospina Iltis
- Cleome albescens Franch.
- Cleome aldenella W.R.Ernst
- Cleome allamanii Chiov.
- Cleome amblyocarpa Barratte & Murb.
- Cleome angulata (DC.) Schult. & Schult.f. – western India and Java
- Cleome angustifolia Forssk. – African – C_{4}
- Cleome anomala Kunth – neotropical
- Cleome arabica L.
- Cleome arenitensis Craven, Lepschi & Fryxell
- Cleome ariana Hedge & Lamond
- Cleome aspera J.Koenig ex DC.
- Cleome atropurpurea Schott
- Cleome augustinensis (Hochr.) Briq.
- Cleome bahiana (Iltis & Costa-e-Silva ex Soares Neto & Roalson) ined.
- Cleome bahiensis (Ule) Christenh. & Byng
- Cleome bicolor Gardner
- Cleome bojeri Hadj-Moust.
- Cleome boliviensis Iltis
- Cleome bororensis (Klotzsch) Oliv.
- Cleome brachiata (Bojer) Briq.
- Cleome brachycarpa Vahl ex DC.
- Cleome brachystyla Deflers
- Cleome brevipetiolata D.F.Chamb. & Lamond
- Cleome briquetii Polhill
- Cleome bundeica P.S.Short
- Cleome burttii R.A.Graham
- Cleome carnosa (Pax) Gilg & Gilg-Ben.
- Cleome chapalensis Iltis
- Cleome chelidonii L.f.
- Cleome chilensis DC.
- Cleome chiriquensis (Standl.) Govaerts
- Cleome chodatiana Iltis
- Cleome chrysantha Decne.
- Cleome cleomoides (F.Muell.) Iltis
- Cleome coccinea (Benth.) Govaerts
- Cleome coeruleorosea Gilg & Gilg-Ben.
- Cleome coluteoides Boiss.
- Cleome conrathii Burtt Davy
- Cleome cordobensis Eichler ex Griseb.
- Cleome cornus-africani (Thulin) Thulin
- Cleome costaricensis Iltis
- Cleome crenopetala DC.
- Cleome decipiens Triana & Planch.
- Cleome densiflora (Benth.) Triana & Planch.
- Cleome densifolia C.H.Wright
- Cleome diffusa Banks ex DC.
- Cleome dodecandra L.
- Cleome domingensis Iltis
- Cleome drepanocarpa O.Schwartz
- Cleome droserifolia Forssk. (Delile)
- Cleome dumosa Baker
- Cleome × ecuadorica Heilborn
- Cleome elegantissima Briq.
- Cleome eosina J.F.Macbr.
- Cleome erosa (Nutt.) Eaton
- Cleome felina L.f.
- Cleome flava Banks ex DC.
- Cleome foliosa Hook.f.
- Cleome formosa (Cochrane) N.Zamora
- Cleome fosteriana Iltis
- Cleome frutescens Aubl.
- Cleome gallaensis Gilg & Gilg-Ben.
- Cleome gigantea L.
- Cleome glandulosa Ruiz & Pav. ex DC.
- Cleome glaucescens DC.
- Cleome gobica Grubov
- Cleome gordjaginii Popov
- Cleome gossweileri Exell
- Cleome guaranitica (Chodat & Hassl.) Briq.
- Cleome guianensis Aubl.
- Cleome gynandra L. – C_{4}
- Cleome hadramautica Thulin
- Cleome hanburyana Penz.
- Cleome hemsleyana (Bullock) Iltis
- Cleome heratensis Bunge & Bien. ex Boiss.
- Cleome hirta (Klotzsch) Oliv.
- Cleome hispidula (DC.) Govaerts
- Cleome horrida Mart. ex Schult. & Schult.f.
- Cleome houstonii R.Br.
- Cleome houtteana Schltdl.
- Cleome humilis Rose
- Cleome iberica DC.
- Cleome iberidella Welw. ex Oliv.
- Cleome inermis Malme
- Cleome insolata P.S.Short
- Cleome jamesii (Torr. & A.Gray) Govaerts
- Cleome jamesonii Briq.
- Cleome kalachariensis Gilg & Gilg-Ben.
- Cleome karachiensis S.Riaz, Abid & Qaiser
- Cleome karjaginii Tzvelev
- Cleome kelleriana (Schinz) Gilg & Gilg-Ben.
- Cleome kenneallyi Hewson
- Cleome kermesina Gilg & Gilg-Ben.
- Cleome kersiana Thulin
- Cleome khorassanica Bunge & Bien. ex Boiss.
- Cleome laburnifolia Roessler
- Cleome lanceolata (Mart. & Zucc.) H.H.Iltis
- Cleome latifolia Vahl ex DC.
- Cleome lechleri Eichler
- Cleome leptorachis Linden & Planch.
- Cleome lilloi M.Gómez
- Cleome limmenensis P.S.Short
- Cleome limoneolens J.F.Macbr.
- Cleome linophylla (O.Schwarz) Pax & K.Hoffm.
- Cleome lipskyi Popov
- Cleome longifolia C.Presl
- Cleome longipes Lamb. ex DC.
- Cleome lophosperma P.S.Short
- Cleome macradenia Schweinf.
- Cleome macrophylla (Klotzsch) Briq.
- Cleome macrorhiza C.Wright
- Cleome maculata (Sond.) Szyszył.
- Cleome magnifica Briq.
- Cleome mathewsii Briq.
- Cleome melanosperma S.Watson
- Cleome microaustralica Iltis
- Cleome microcarpa Ule
- Cleome monandra DC.
- Cleome monophylla L.
- Cleome monophylloides R.Wilczek
- Cleome moricandii Briq.
- Cleome moritziana Klotzsch ex Eichler
- Cleome mossamedensis Exell & Mendonça
- Cleome niamniamensis Schweinf. & Gilg
- Cleome oligandra Kers
- Cleome omanensis (D.F.Chamb. & Lamond) Thulin
- Cleome ornithopodioides L.
- Cleome oxalidea F.Muell. – C_{4}
- Cleome oxypetala Boiss.
- Cleome oxyphylla Burch.
- Cleome pakistanica (Jafri) Khatoon & A.Perveen
- Cleome pallida Kotschy
- Cleome paludosa Willd. ex Eichler
- Cleome paradoxa R.Br. ex DC.
- Cleome parviflora Kunth
- Cleome parviflora Kunth
- Cleome parvipetala R.A.Graham
- Cleome parvisepala Heilborn
- Cleome parvula R.A.Graham
- Cleome paxii (Schinz) Gilg & Gilg-Ben.
- Cleome perrieri Hadj-Moust.
- Cleome pilosa Benth.
- Cleome polyanthera Schweinf. & Gilg
- Cleome polytricha Franch.
- Cleome postrata D.Subram.
- Cleome procumbens Jacq.
- Cleome puberula Triana & Planch.
- Cleome puccionia Christenh. & Byng
- Cleome pulchella (Lindl.) Schult. & Schult.f.
- Cleome quinquenervia DC.
- Cleome ramosissima Parl. ex Webb
- Cleome regnellii Eichler
- Cleome rosea Vahl ex DC.
- Cleome rostrata Bobrov
- Cleome rotundifolia (Mart. & Zucc.) Iltis
- Cleome rubella Burch.
- Cleome rutidosperma DC.
- Cleome rubelloides Kers
- Cleome rupicola Vicary
- Cleome scaposa DC.
- Cleome schimperi Pax
- Cleome schlechteri Briq.
- Cleome semitetrandra Sond.
- Cleome serrata Jacq.
- Cleome siliculifera Eichler
- Cleome silvatica Gilg & Gilg-Ben.
- Cleome simplicifolia (Cambess.) Hook.f. & Thomson
- Cleome socotrana Balf.f.
- Cleome speciosa Raf.
- Cleome spinosa Jacq.
- Cleome stenopetala Gilg & Gilg-Ben.
- Cleome stenophylla Klotzsch ex Urban
- Cleome steveniana Schult. & Schult.f.
- Cleome stricta (Klotzsch) R.A.Graham
- Cleome strigosa (Bojer) Oliv.
- Cleome stylosa Eichler
- Cleome suffruticosa Schinz
- Cleome tenella L.f.
- Cleome tenuifolia (Mart. & Zucc.) Iltis
- Cleome tenuis S.Watson
- Cleome tetrandra DC.
- Cleome titubans Speg.
- Cleome tomentella Popov
- Cleome torticarpa Iltis & T.Ruíz
- Cleome trachycarpa Klotzsch ex Eichler
- Cleome trachysperma (Torr. & A.Gray) Pax & K.Hoffm.
- Cleome tucumanensis H.H.Iltis
- Cleome turkmena Bobrov
- Cleome uncifera Kers
- Cleome uniglandulosa Cav.
- Cleome usambarica Pax
- Cleome vahliana Fresen.
- Cleome violacea L.
- Cleome virens J.F.Macbr.
- Cleome viscosa L.
- Cleome werdermannii Alf.Ernst
- Cleome yunnanensis W.W.Sm.

== Cultivation and uses ==
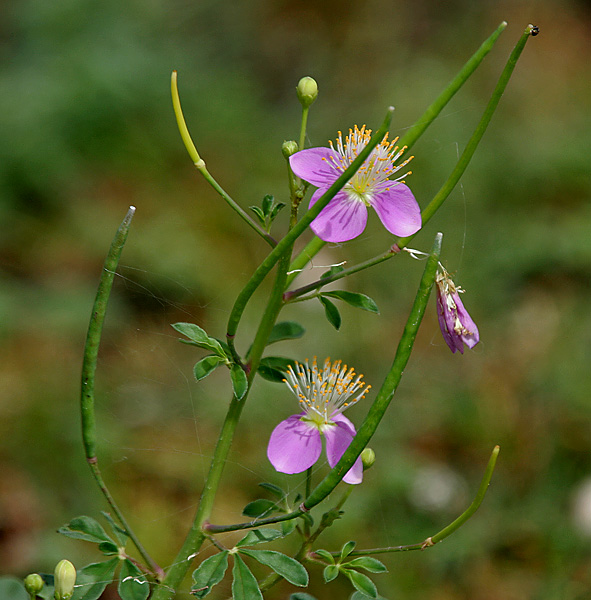
Cleome chelidonii at Pocharam Lake, Andhra Pradesh, India

Cleome gynandra is used as a vegetable crop. C. houtteana is a commonly cultivated ornamental plant with purple, pink, or white flowers.

== Gallery of species ==
Stereo image
Left frame
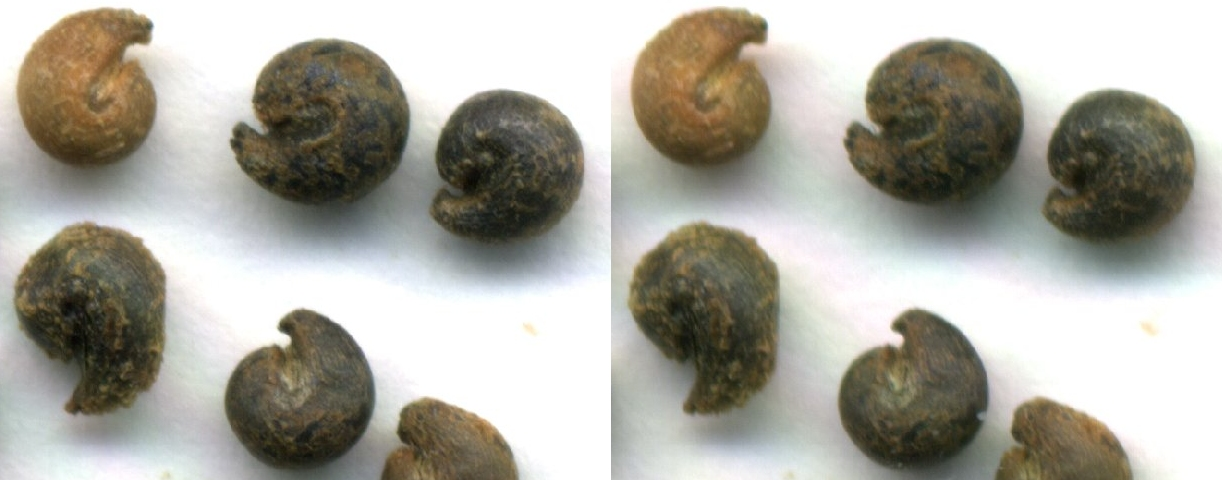
Right frame
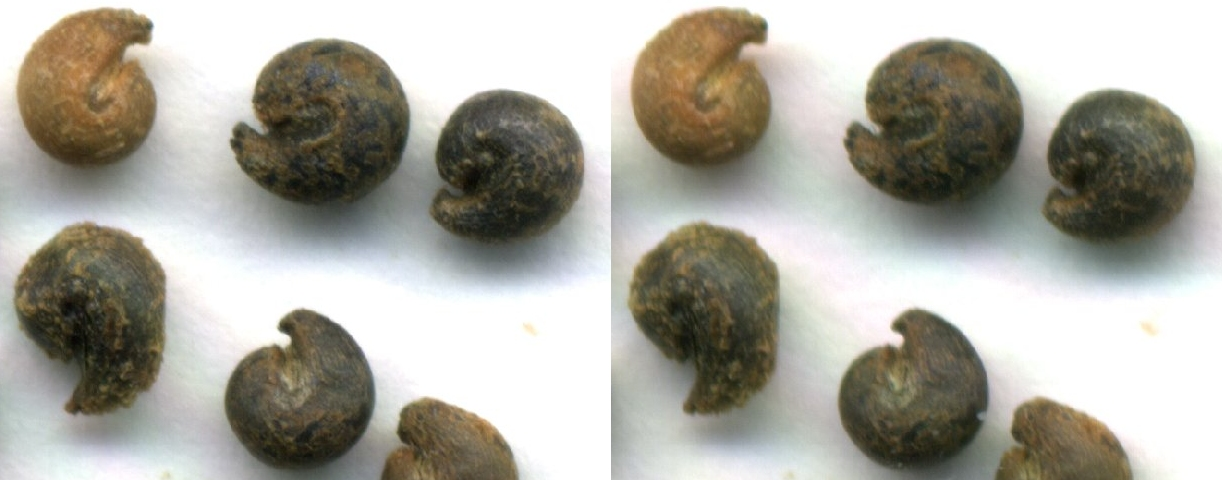
Parallel view
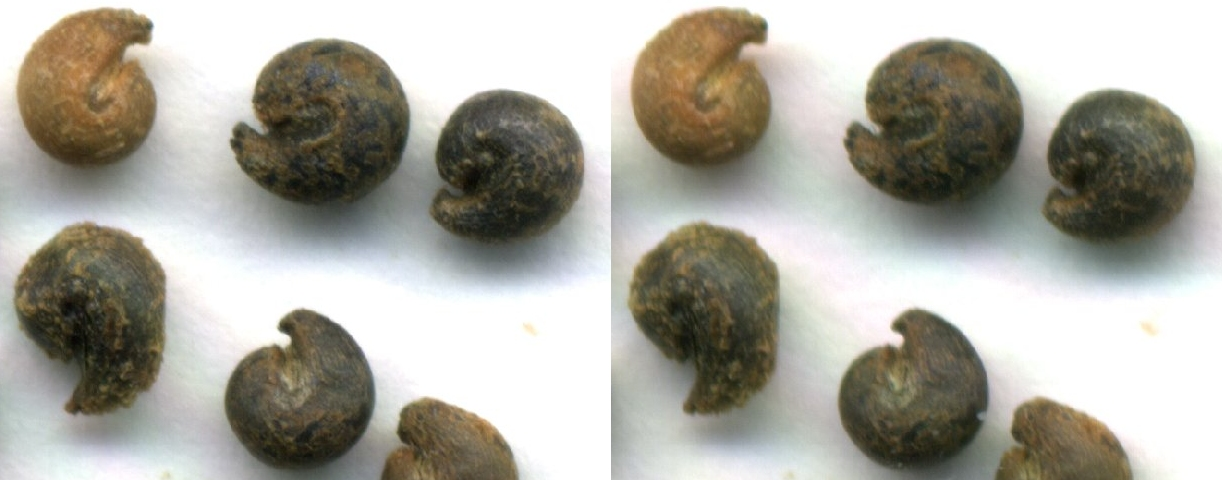
Cross-eye view
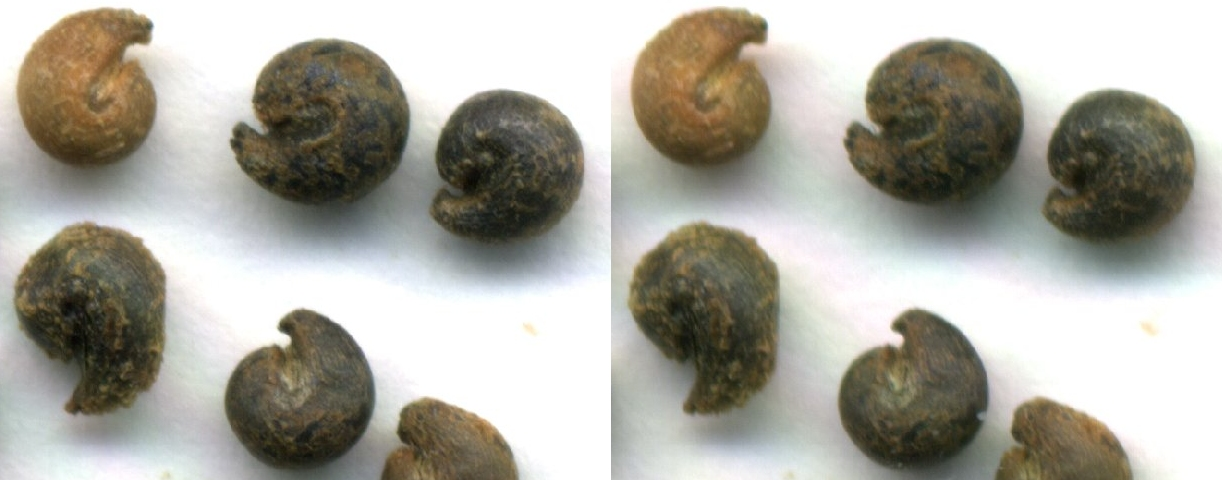

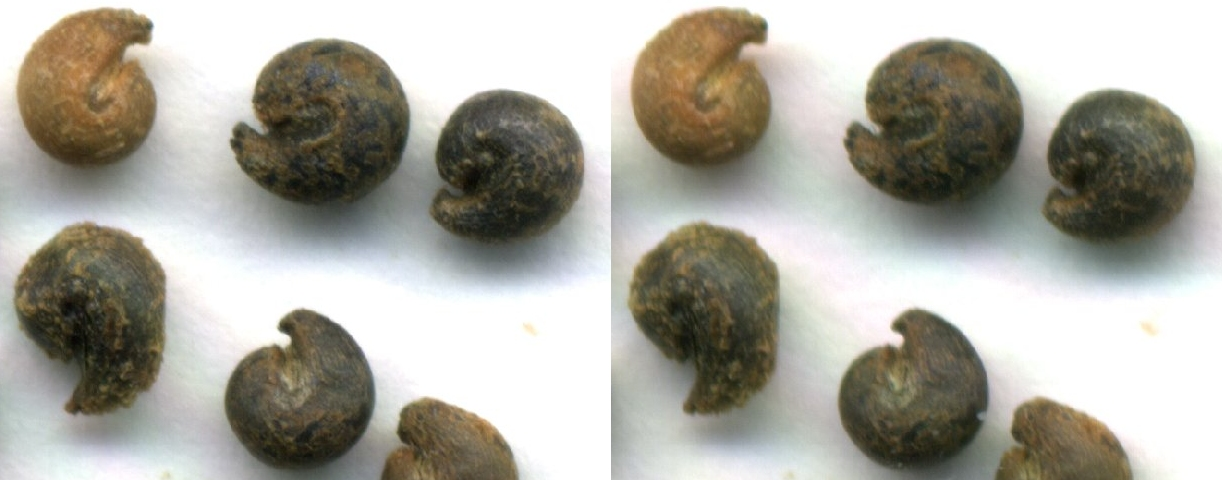
- Cleome seeds resemble snail shells

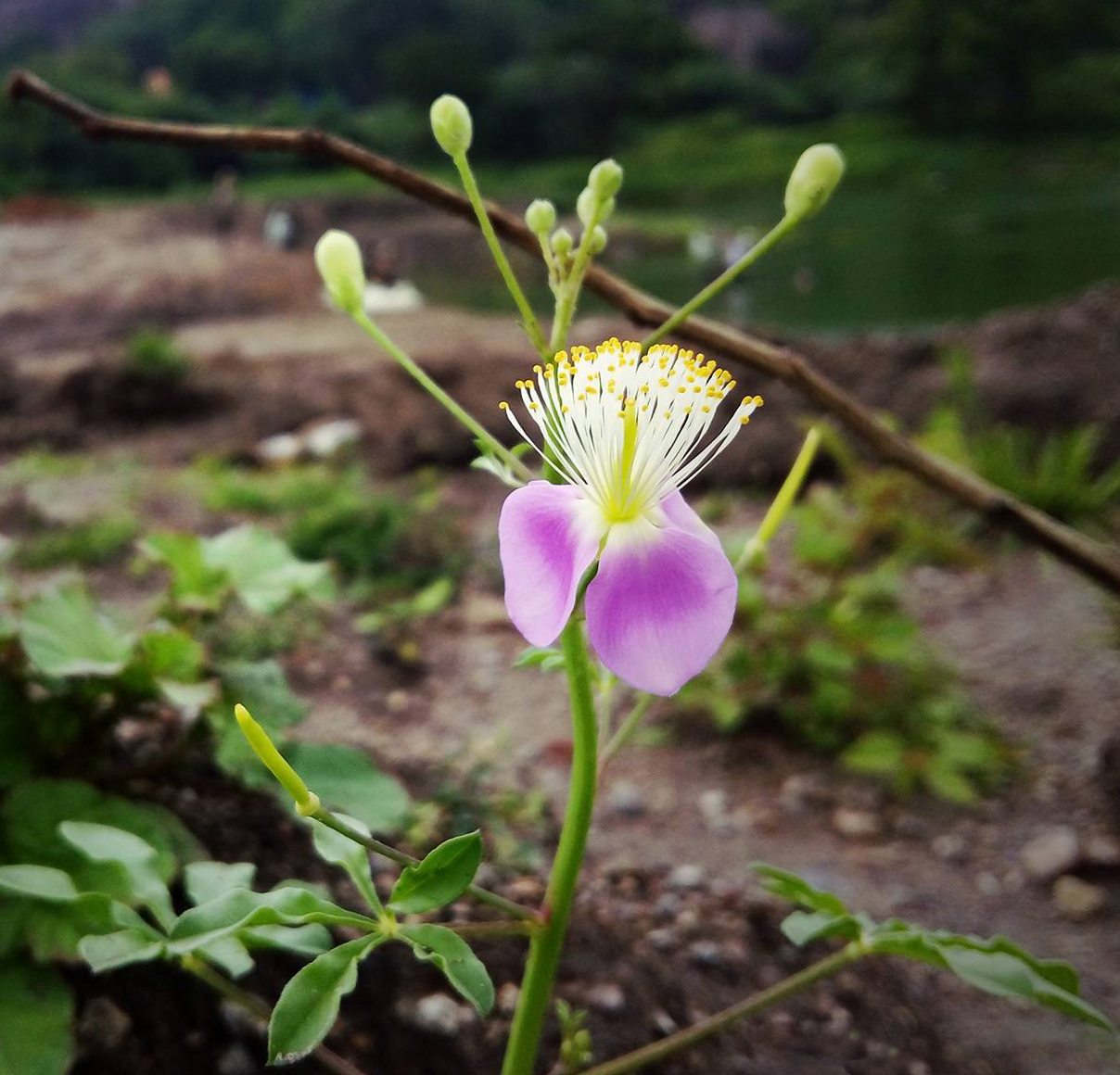
Cleome chelidonii

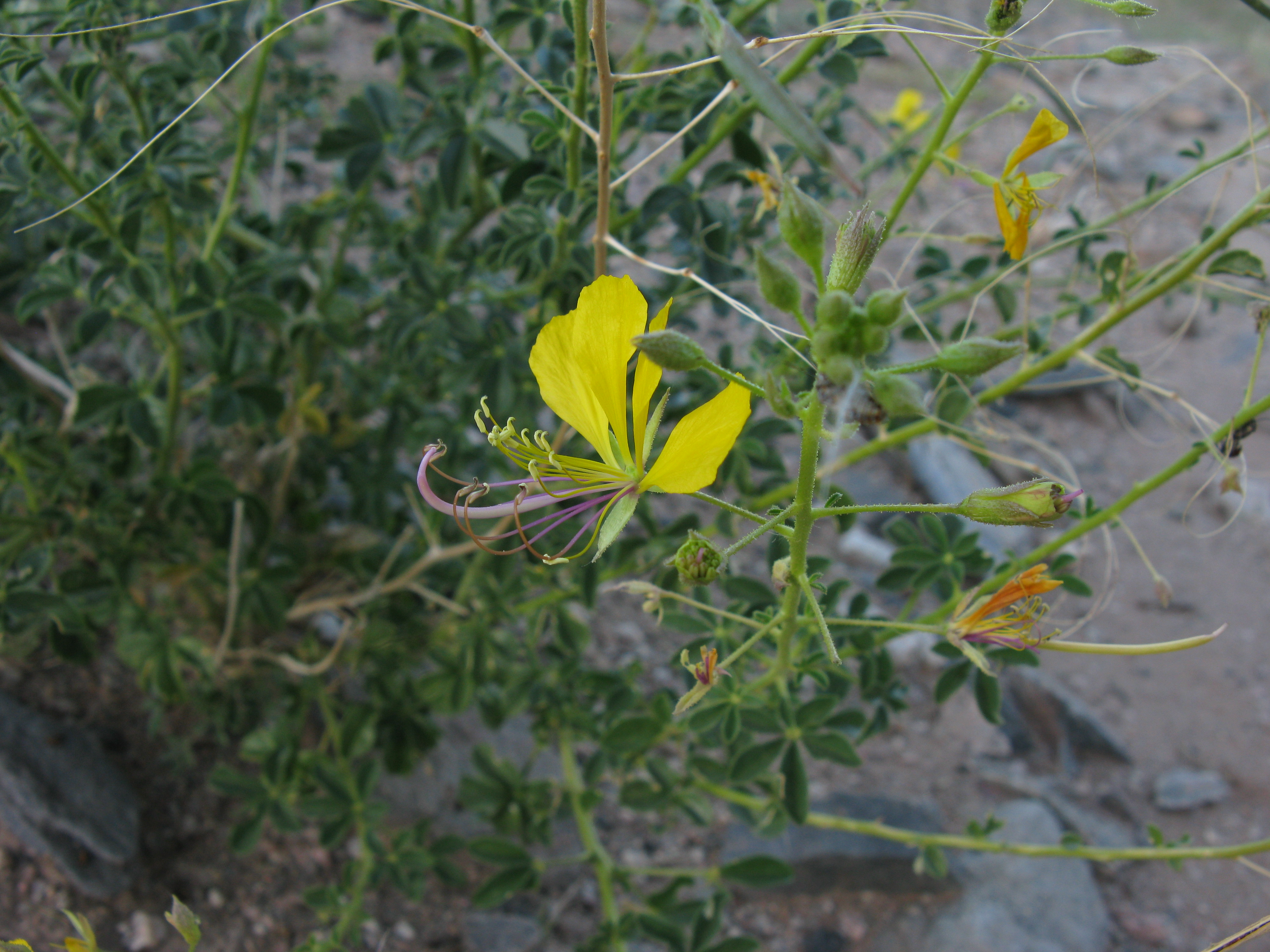
Cleome foliosa, from arid region in Namibia

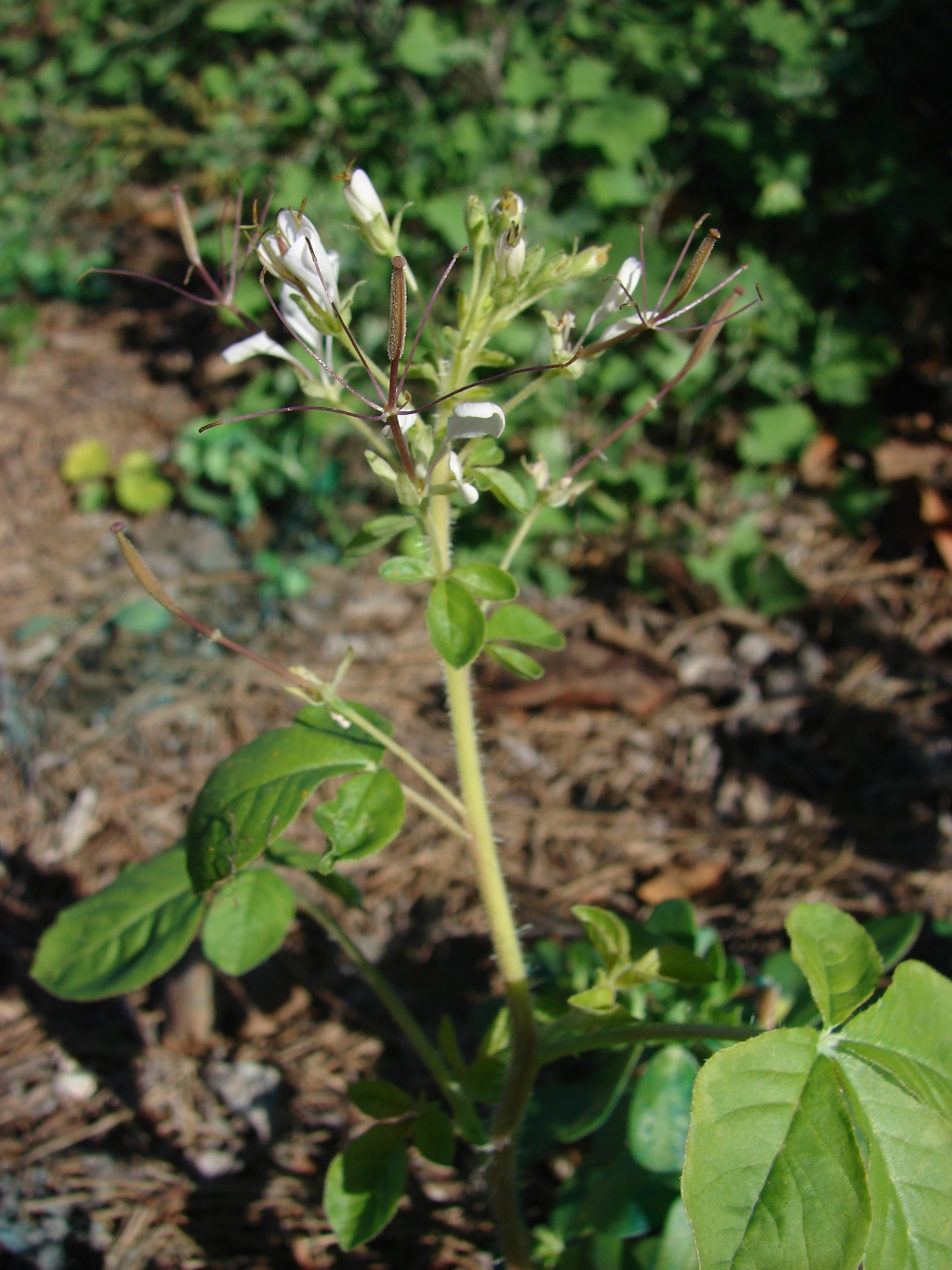
Cleome gynandra, cultivated as a vegetable

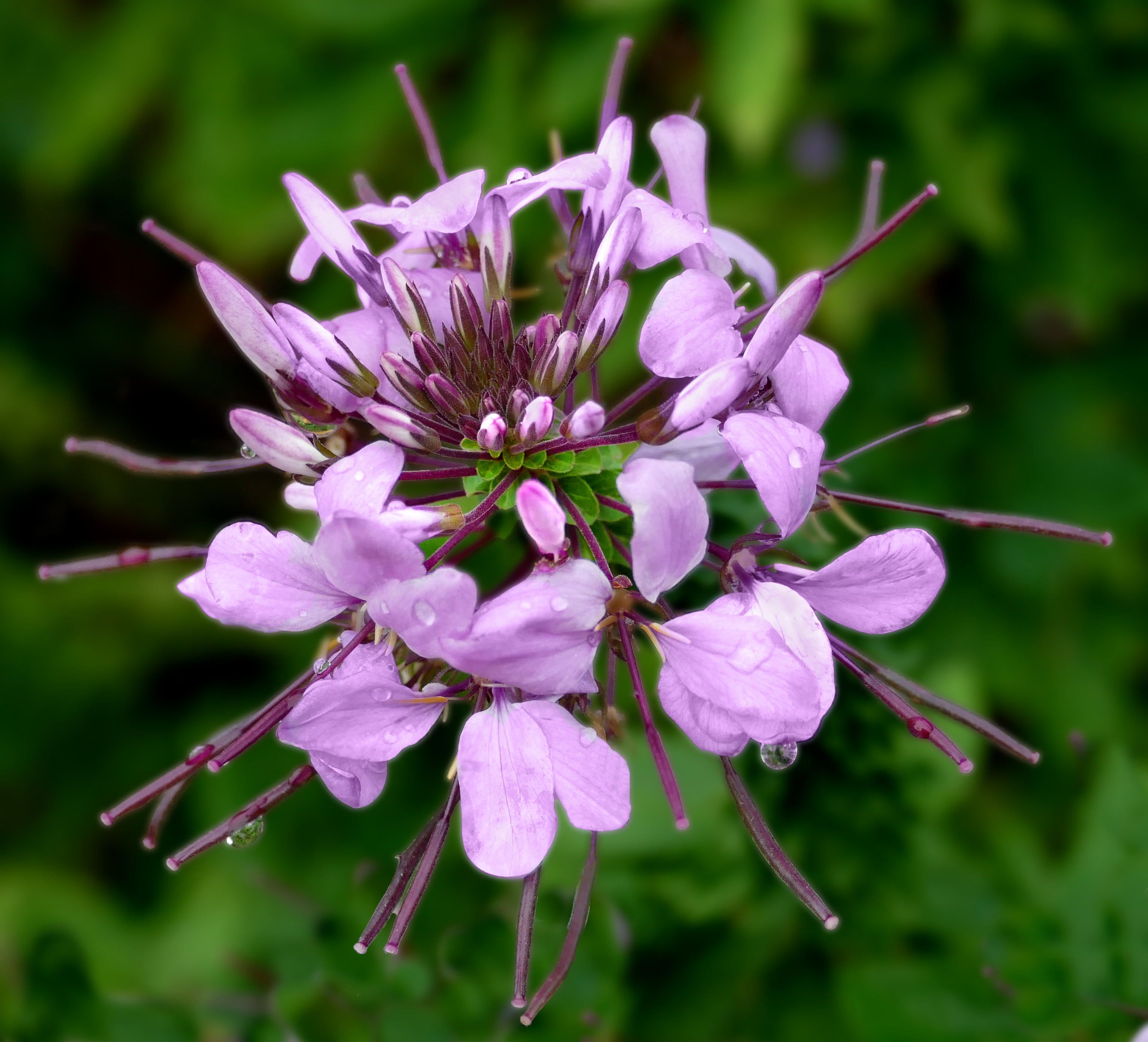
Cleome 'Inncleosr' Senorita Rosalita

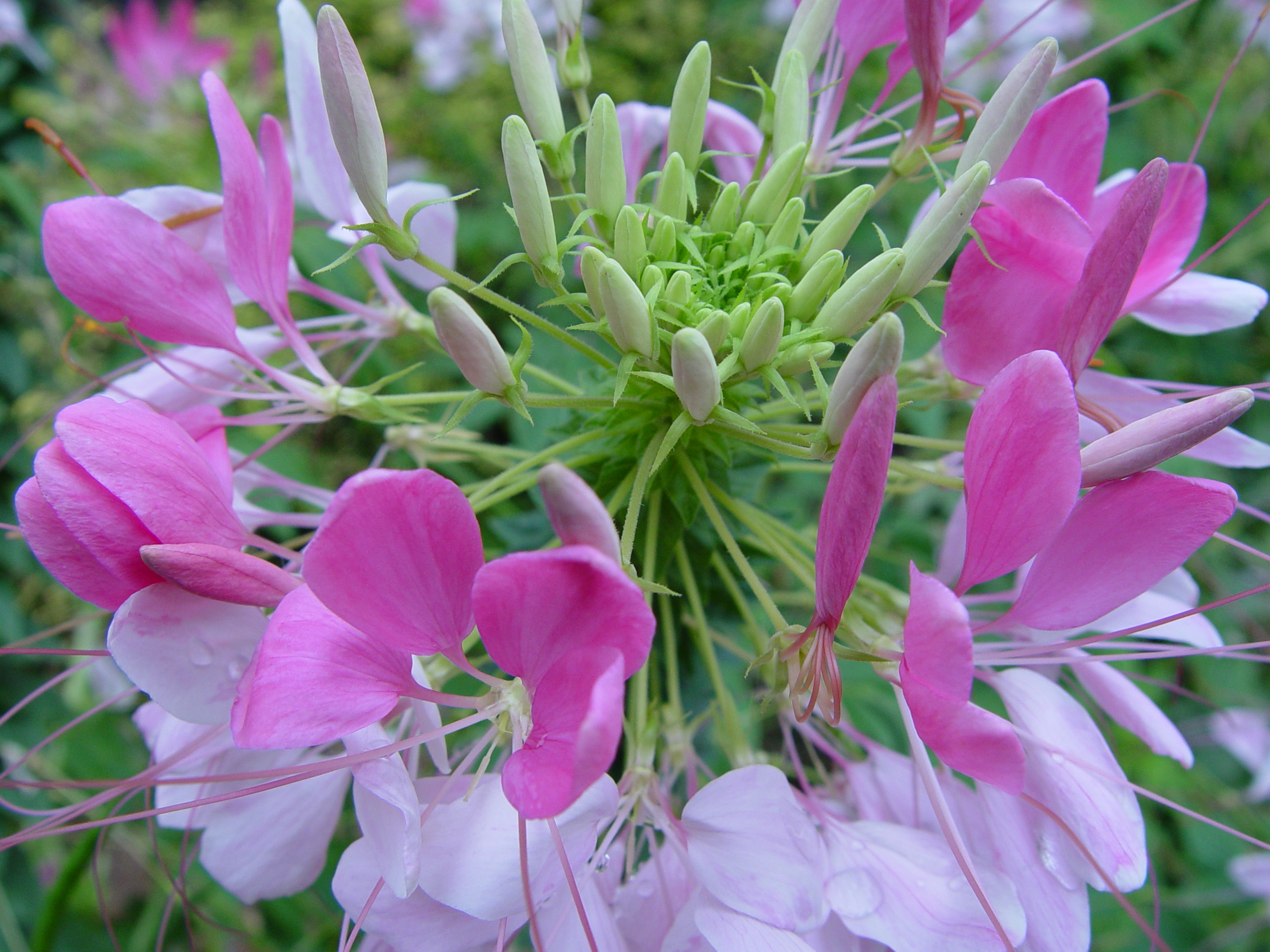
Cleome houtteana also known as Tarenaya hassleriana a common garden ornamental

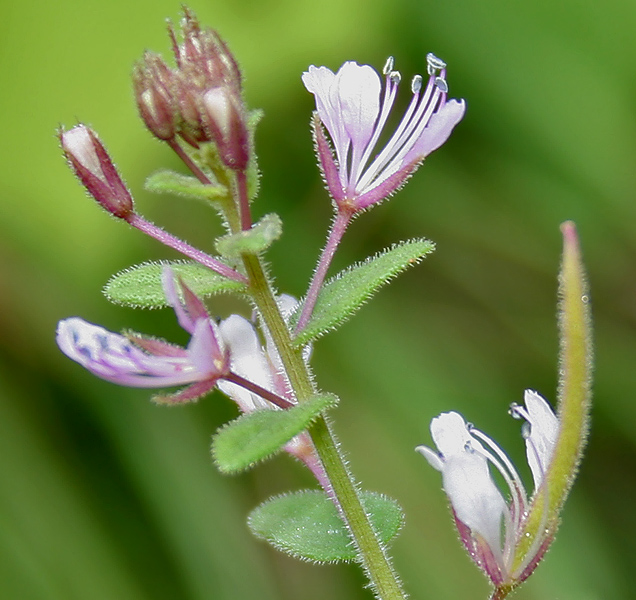
Cleome monophylla

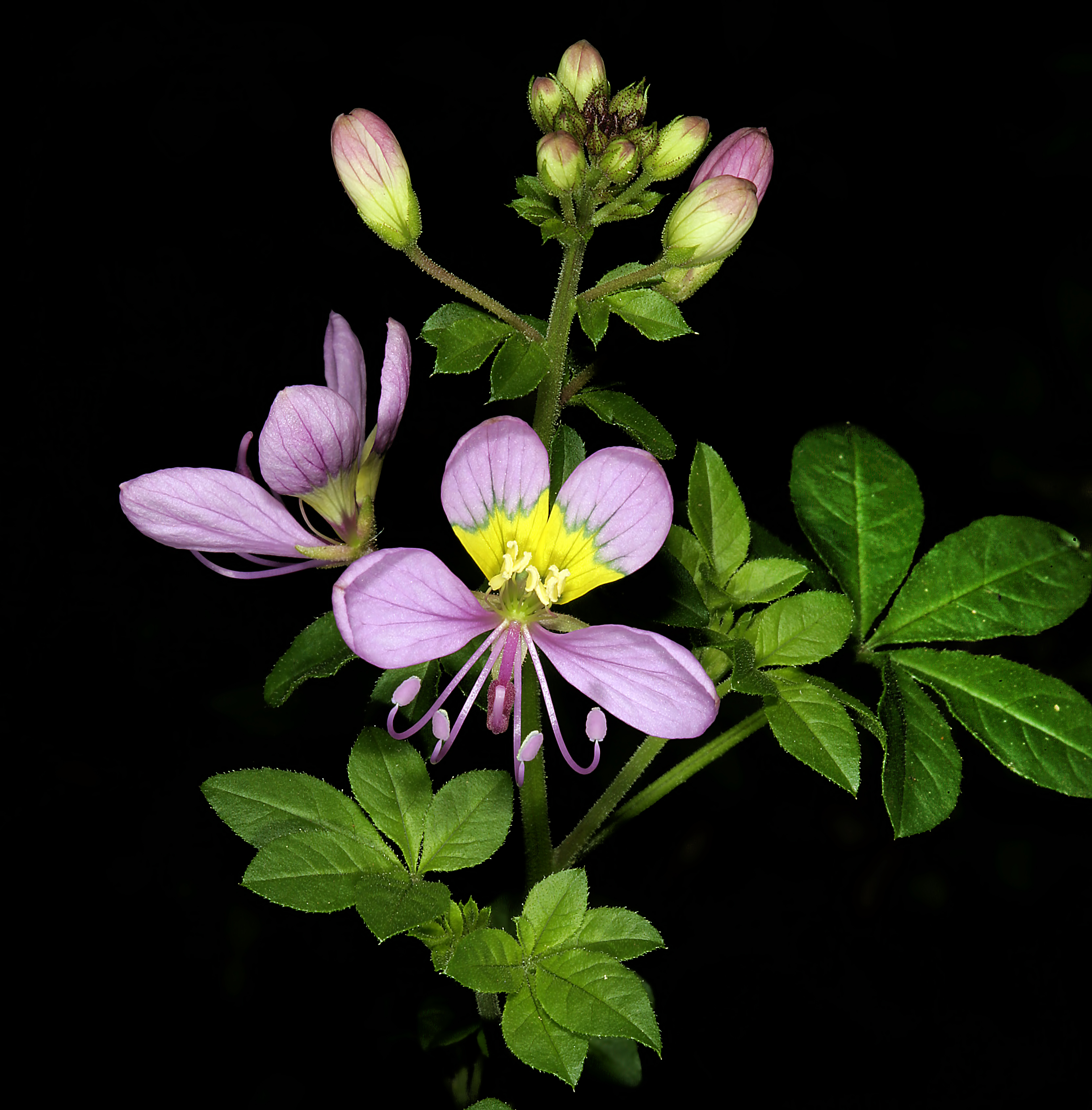
Cleome oxyphylla

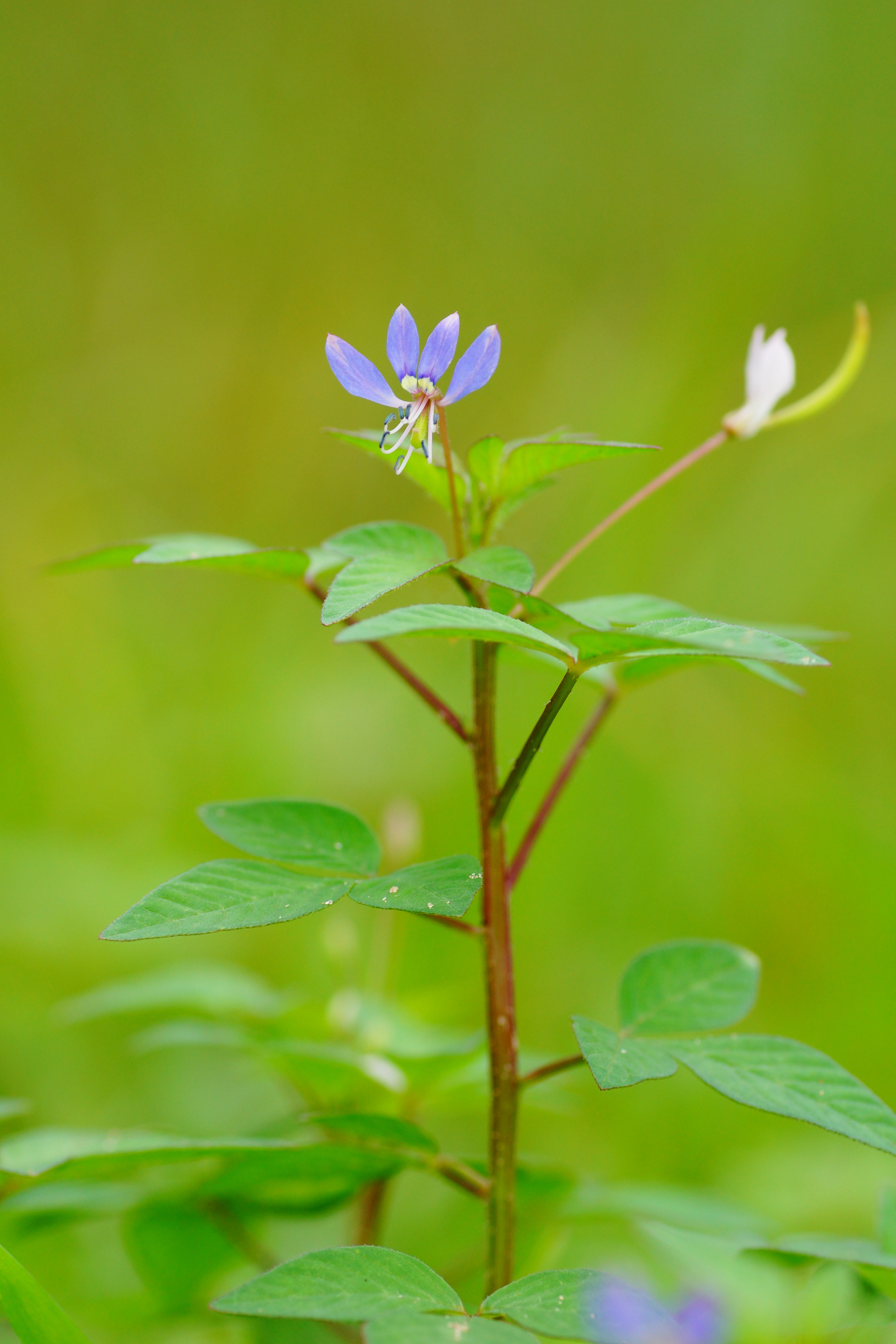
Cleome rutidosperma

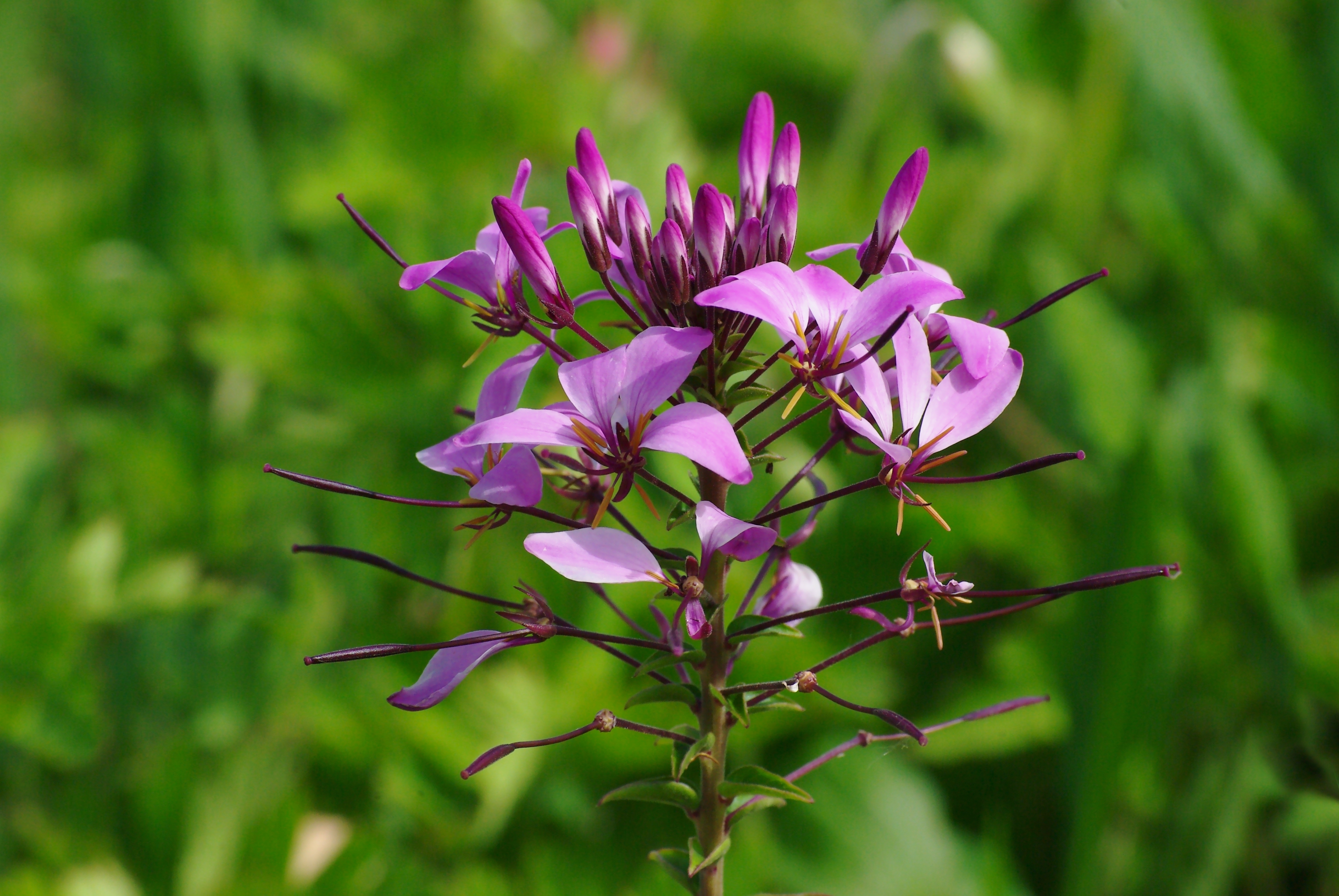
Cleome spinosa

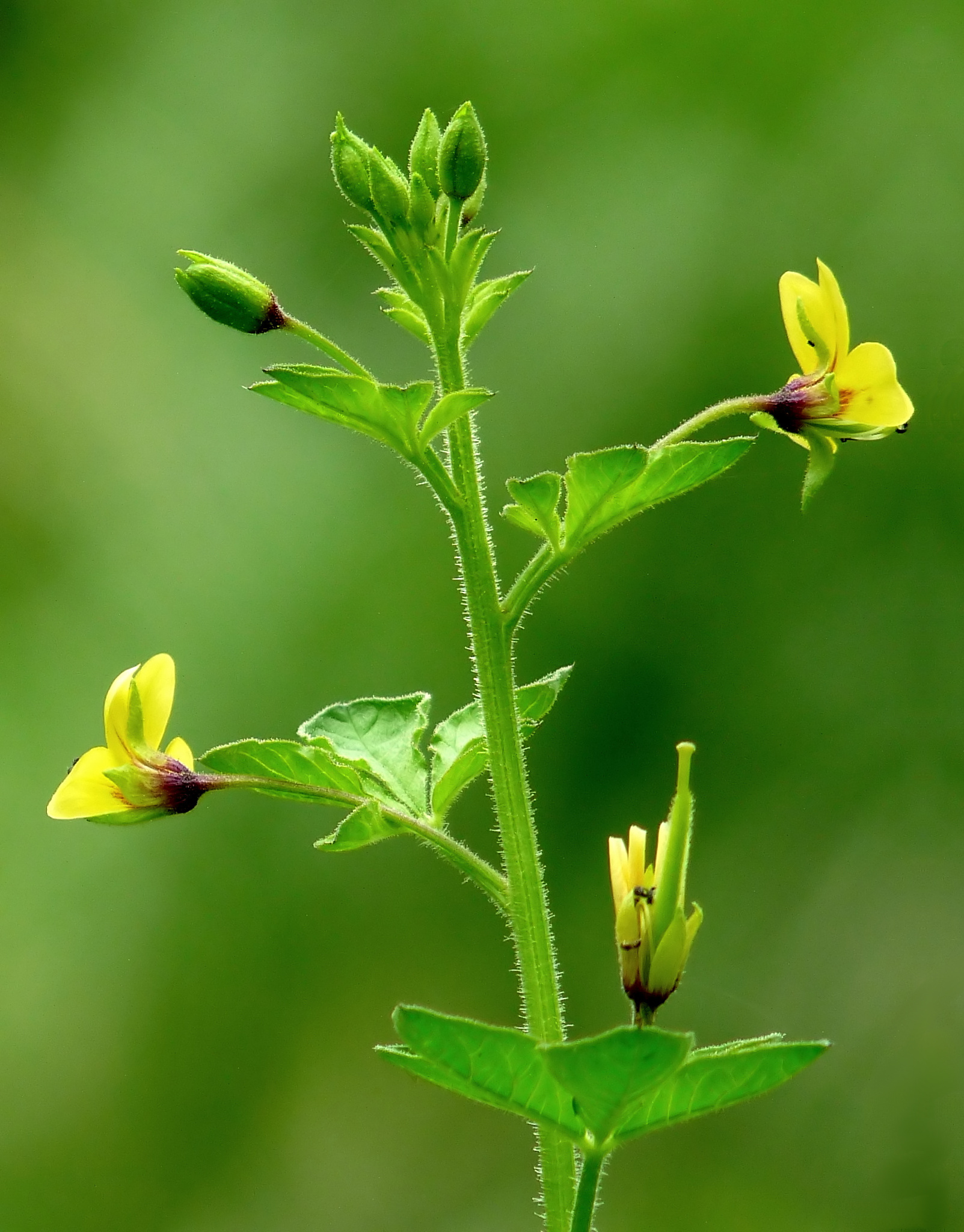
Cleome viscosa
