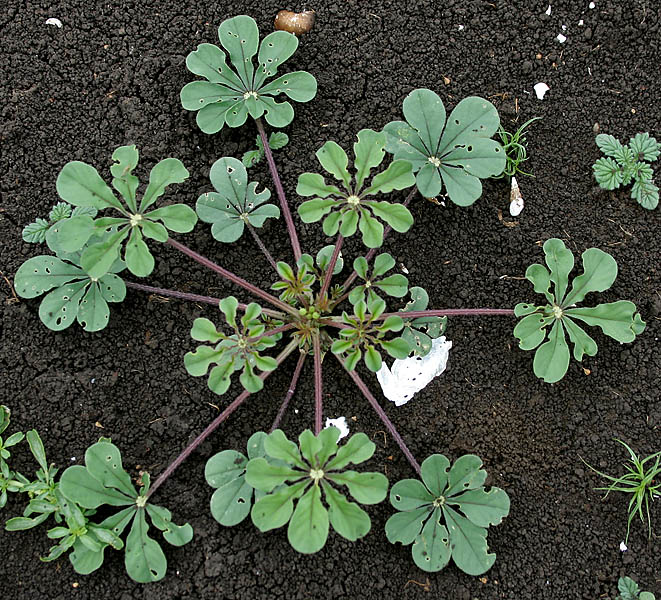

Scientific classification
- Kingdom: Plantae
- Clade: Tracheophytes
- Clade: Angiosperms
- Clade: Eudicots
- Clade: Rosids
- Order: Brassicales
- Family: Cleomaceae
- Genus: Cleome
- Species: C. chelidonii

Binomial name
- Cleome chelidonii L.f.

= Cleome chelidonii =

Species of plant

Cleome chelidonii is a species of plant in the family Cleomaceae. It is native to India, Sri Lanka, Southeast Asia, and Java.
