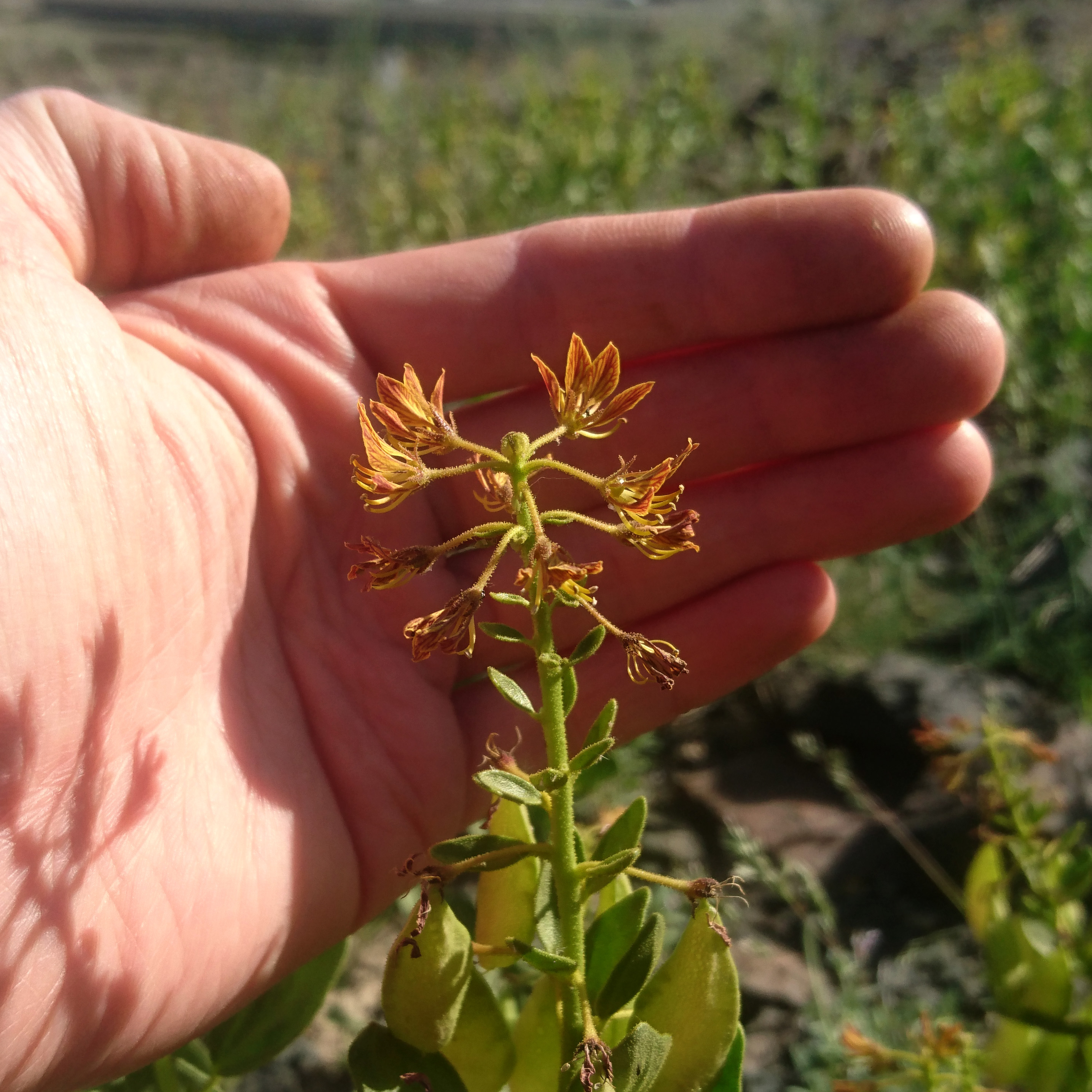

Scientific classification
- Kingdom: Plantae
- Clade: Tracheophytes
- Clade: Angiosperms
- Clade: Eudicots
- Clade: Rosids
- Order: Brassicales
- Family: Cleomaceae
- Genus: Cleome
- Species: C. coluteoides

Binomial name
- Cleome coluteoides Boiss.

= Cleome coluteoides =

Species of flowering plant

Cleome coluteoides is a perennial herbaceous plant with rhizome from the Cleomaceae family. It grows to a height of 15 to 60 cm (6 to 24 in). Stems, branches, and leaves are covered with glandular hairs. The fresh plant has an unpleasant odor. It has yellow petals with purple veins. The fruit is a balloon-shaped capsule, 2.5 to 4.5 cm (1.0 to 1.8 in) long and 1 to 3.5 cm (0.4 to 1.4 in) wide, that is indehiscent and usually hanging. It is native to Iran, Iraq, Afghanistan and Turkmenistan.

== Gallery ==
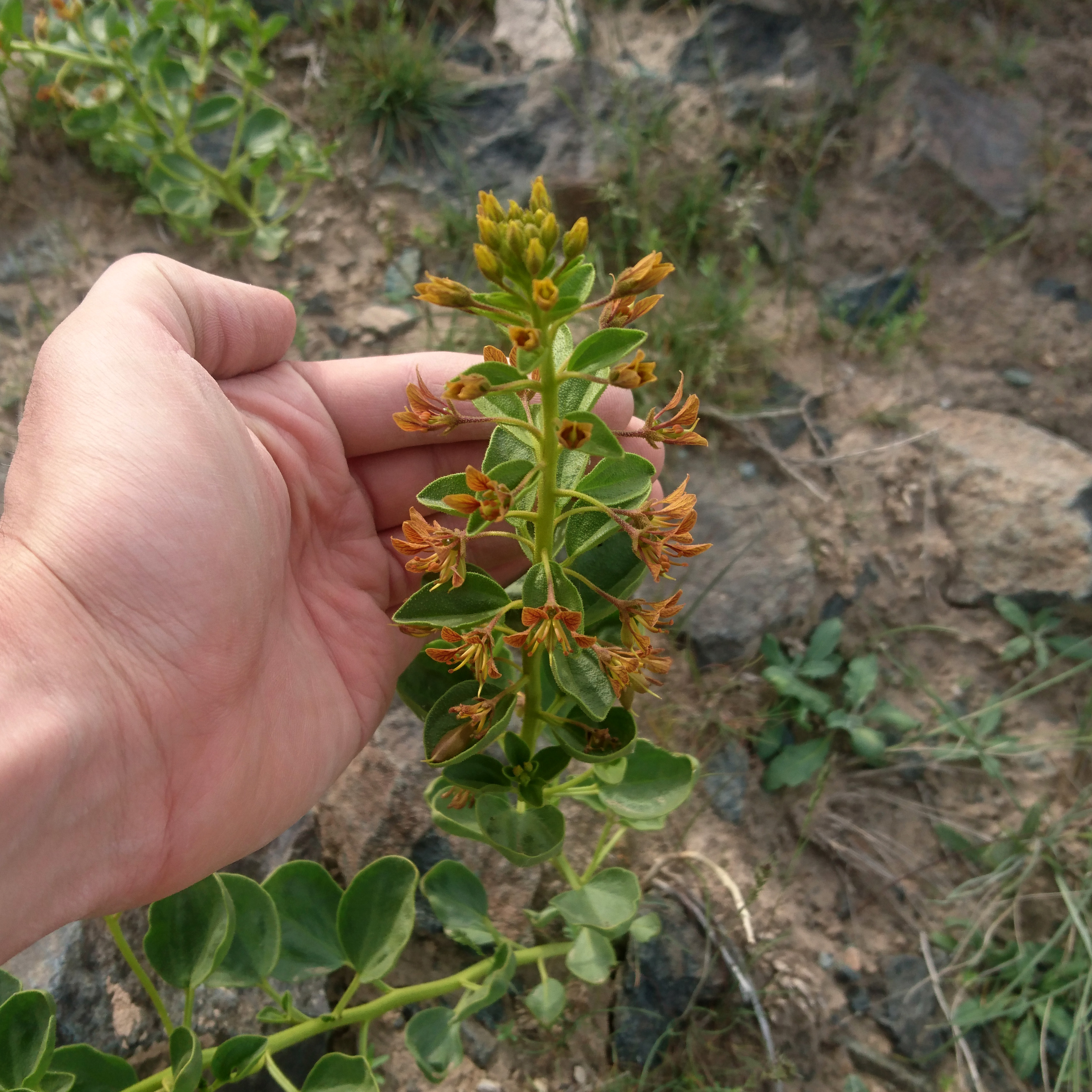

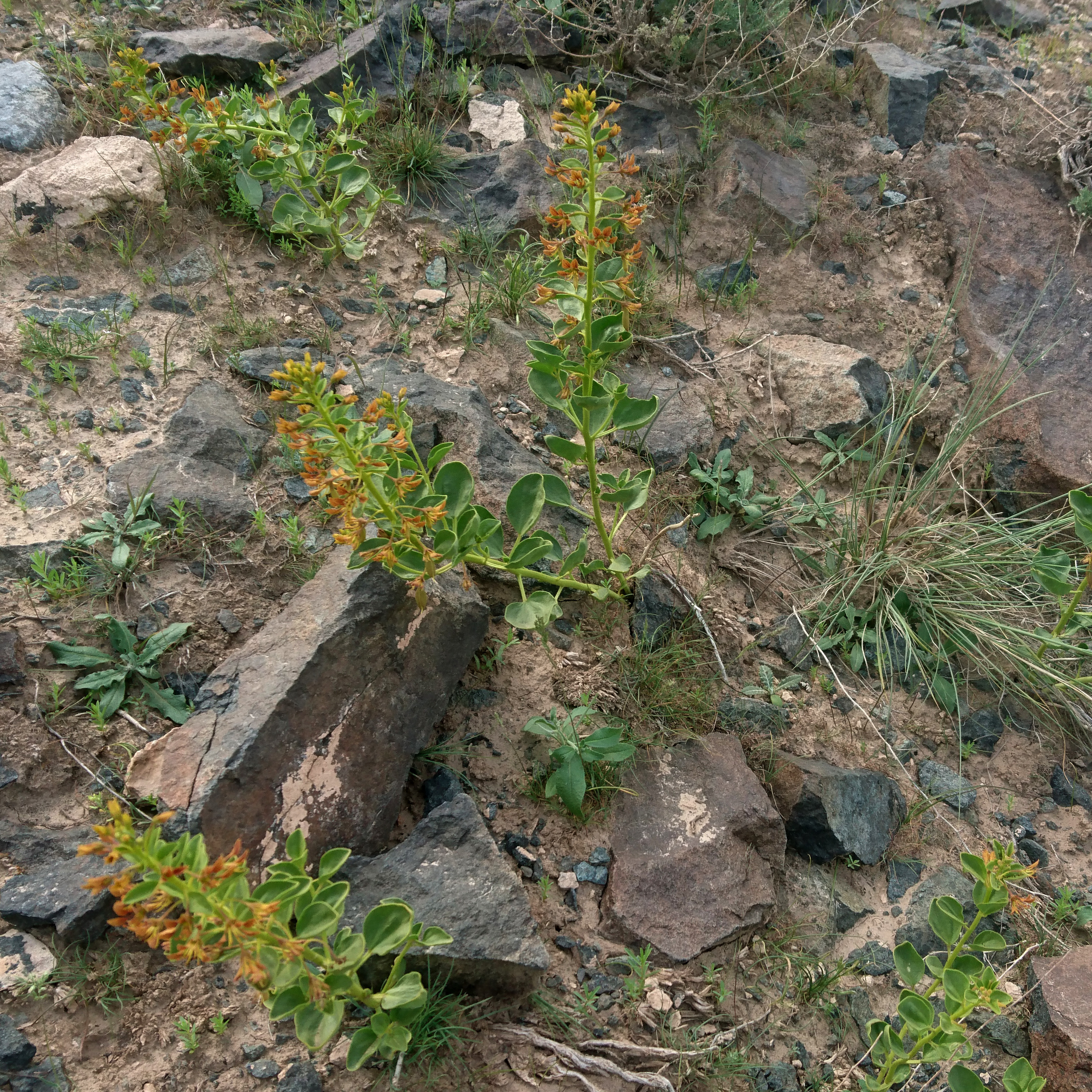

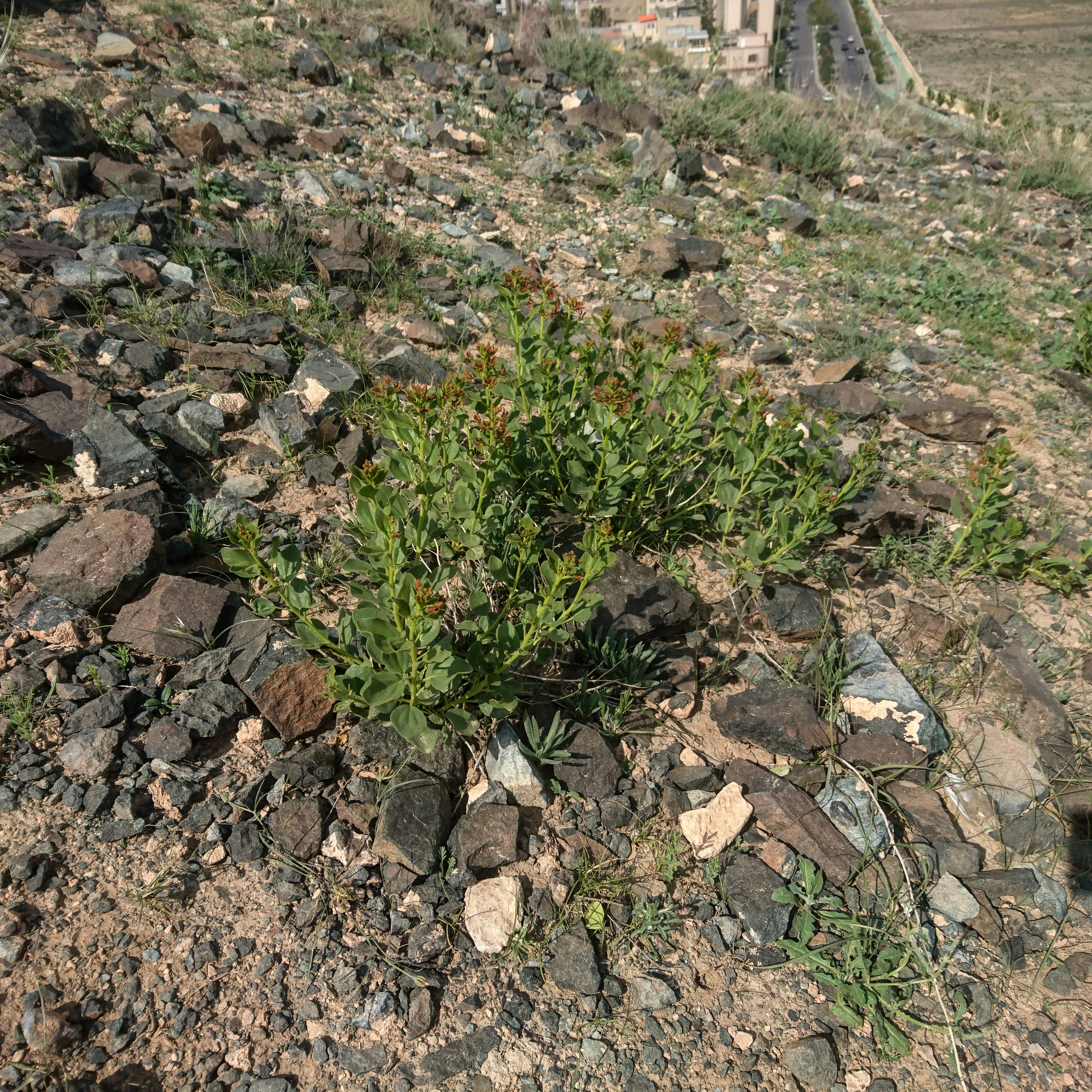

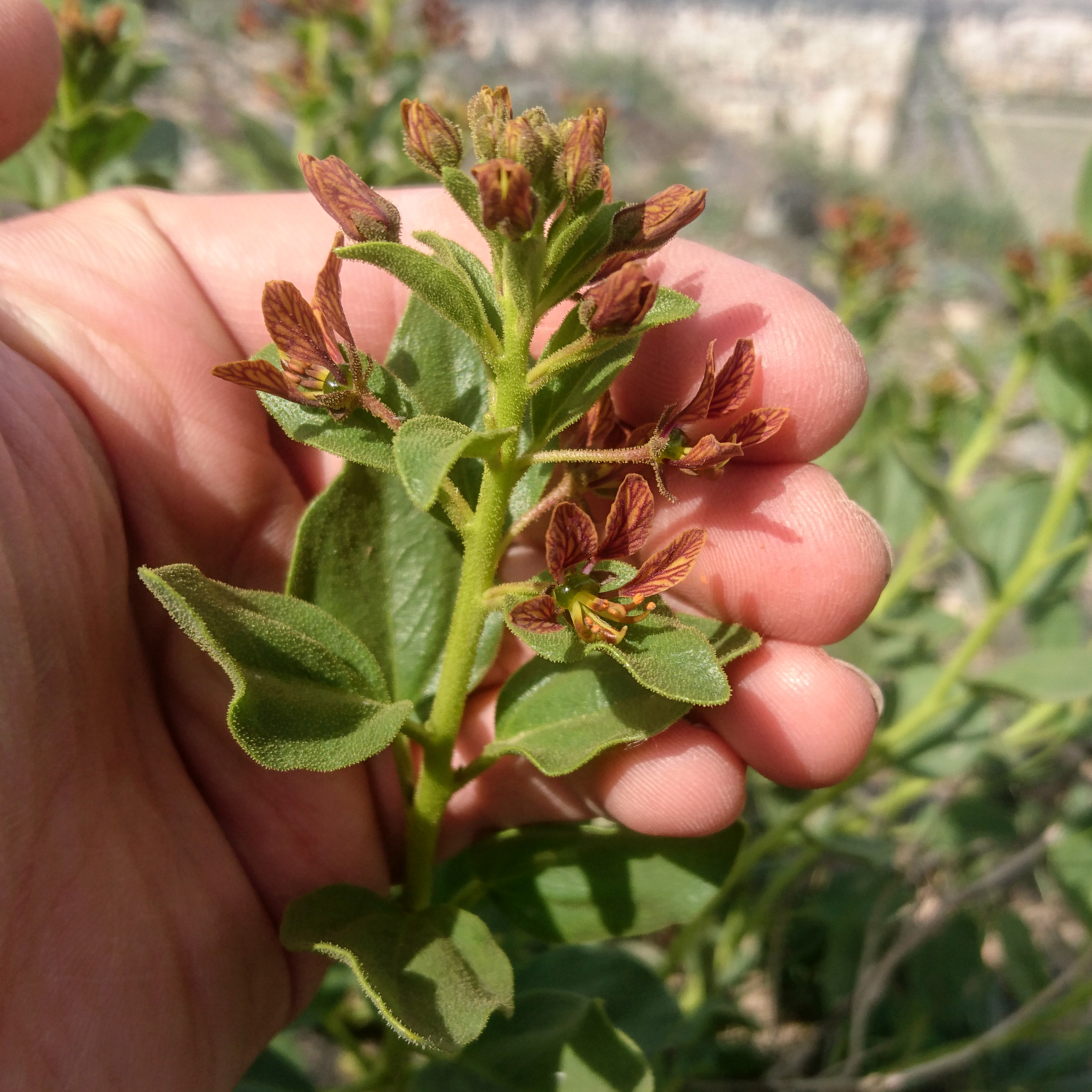

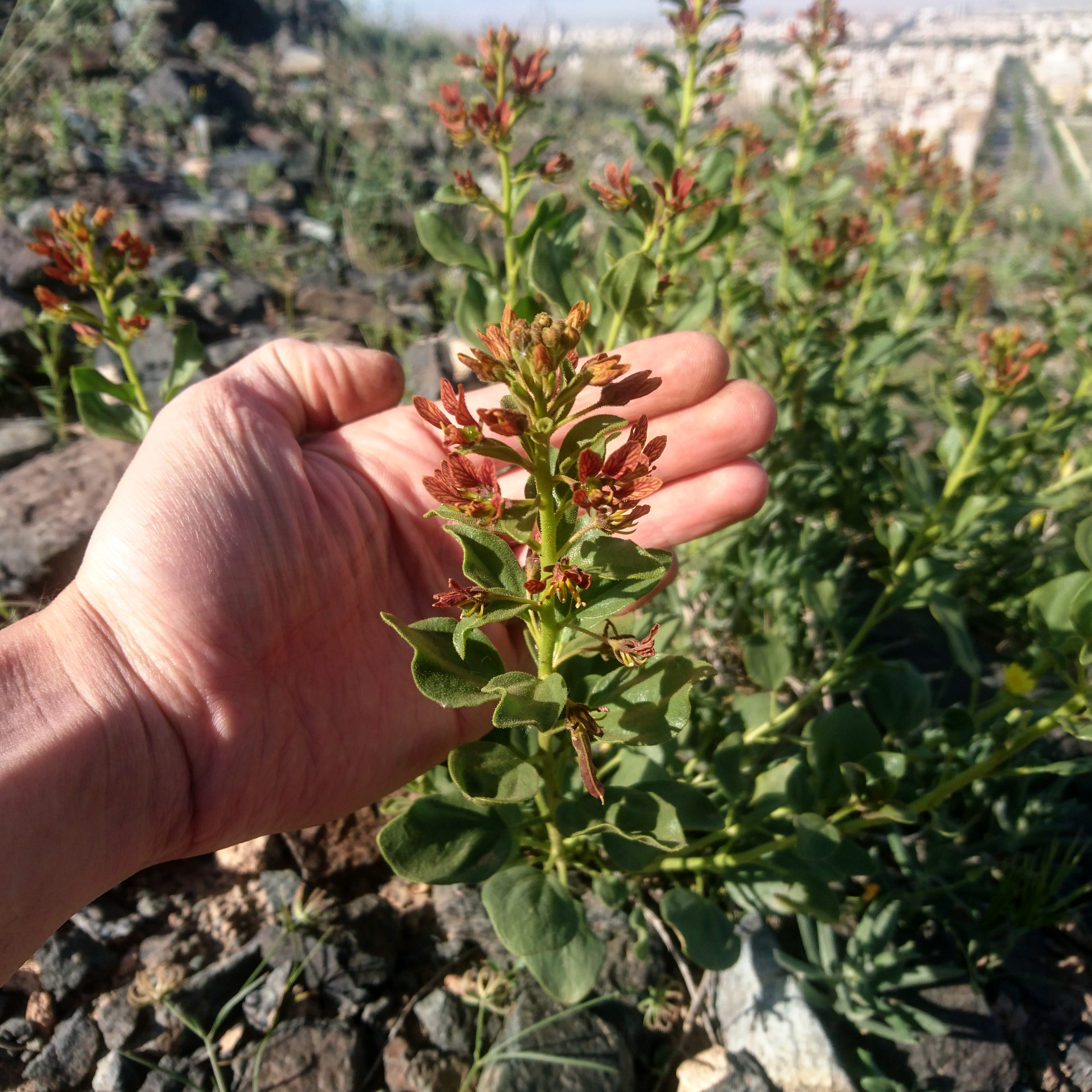

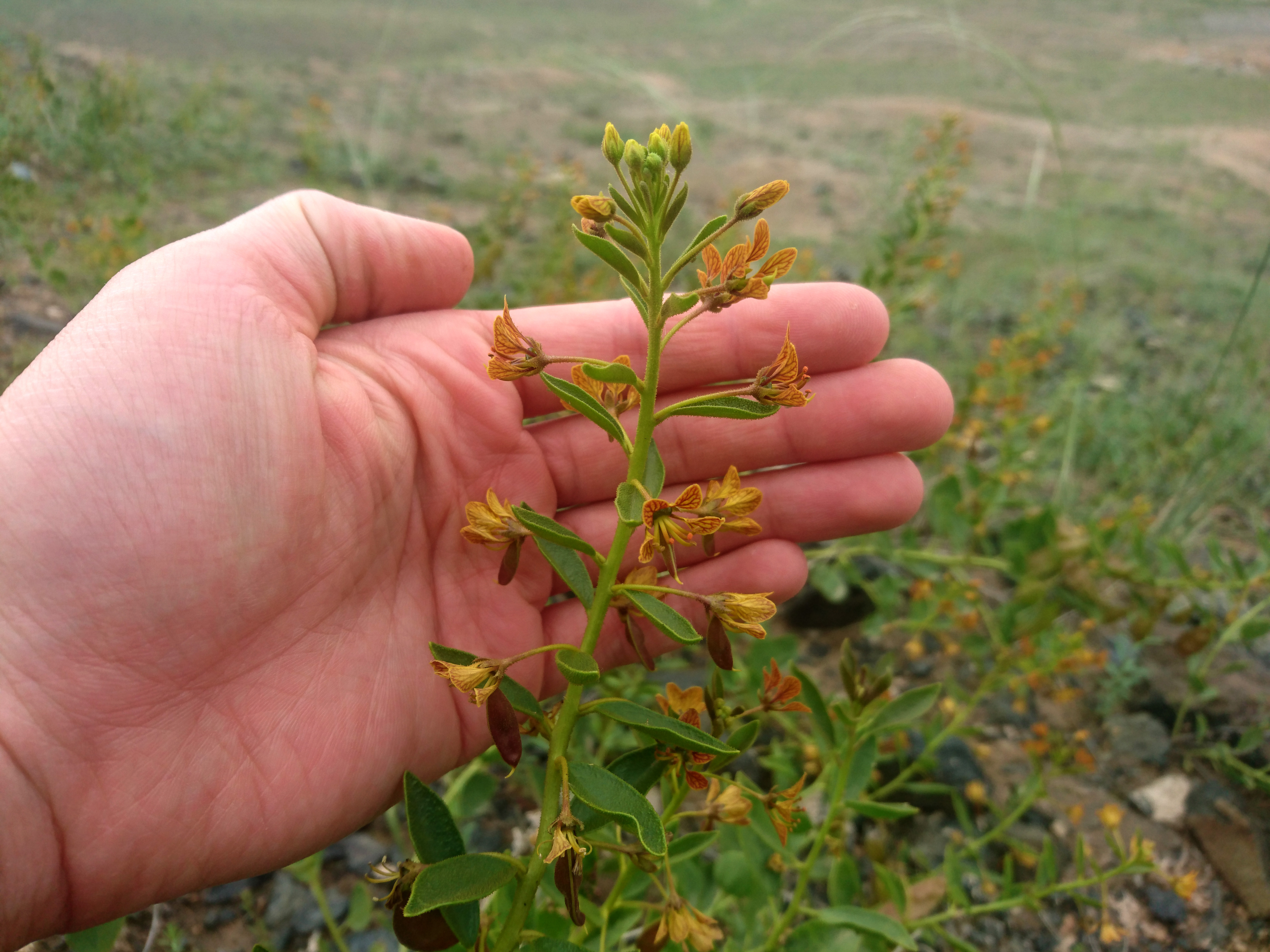

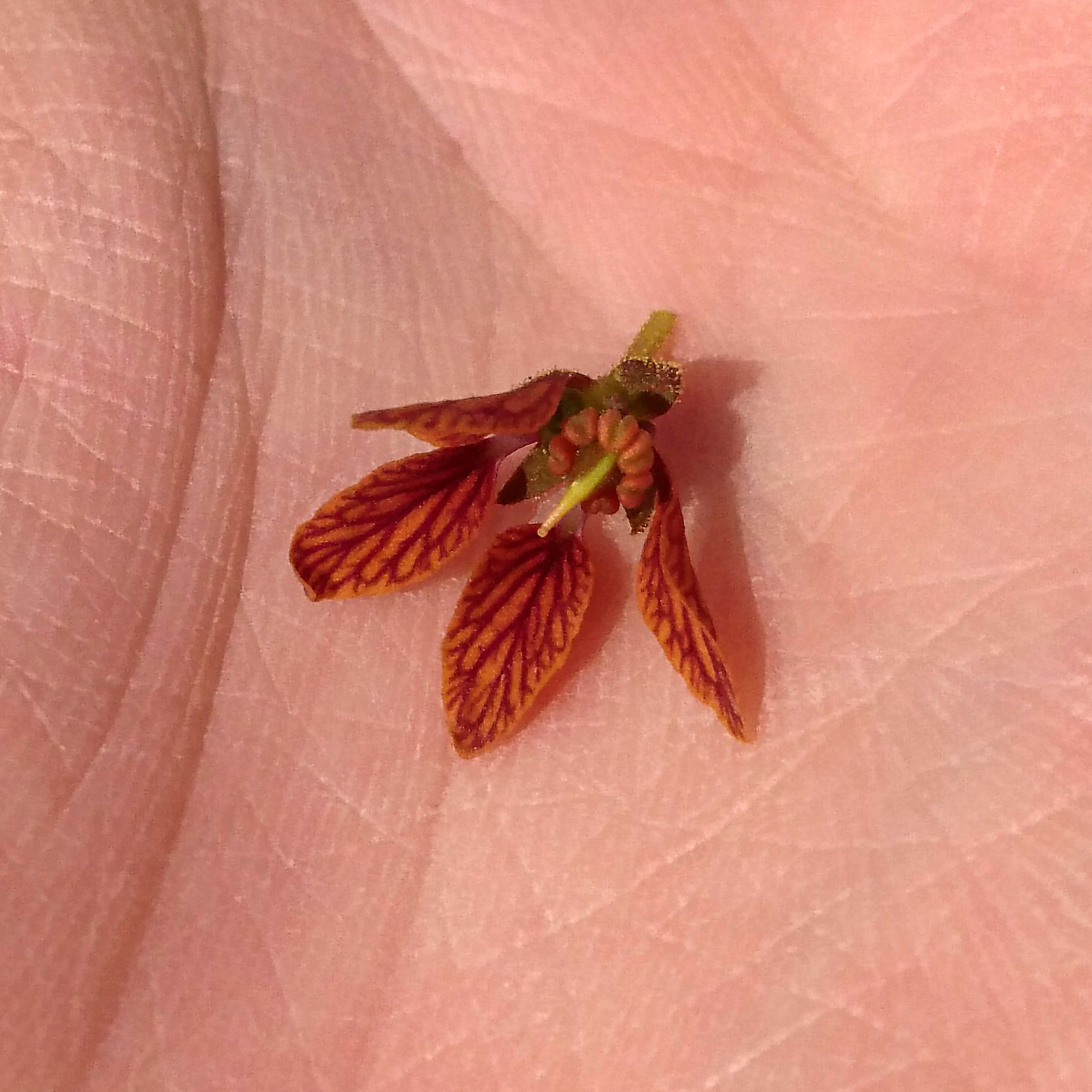

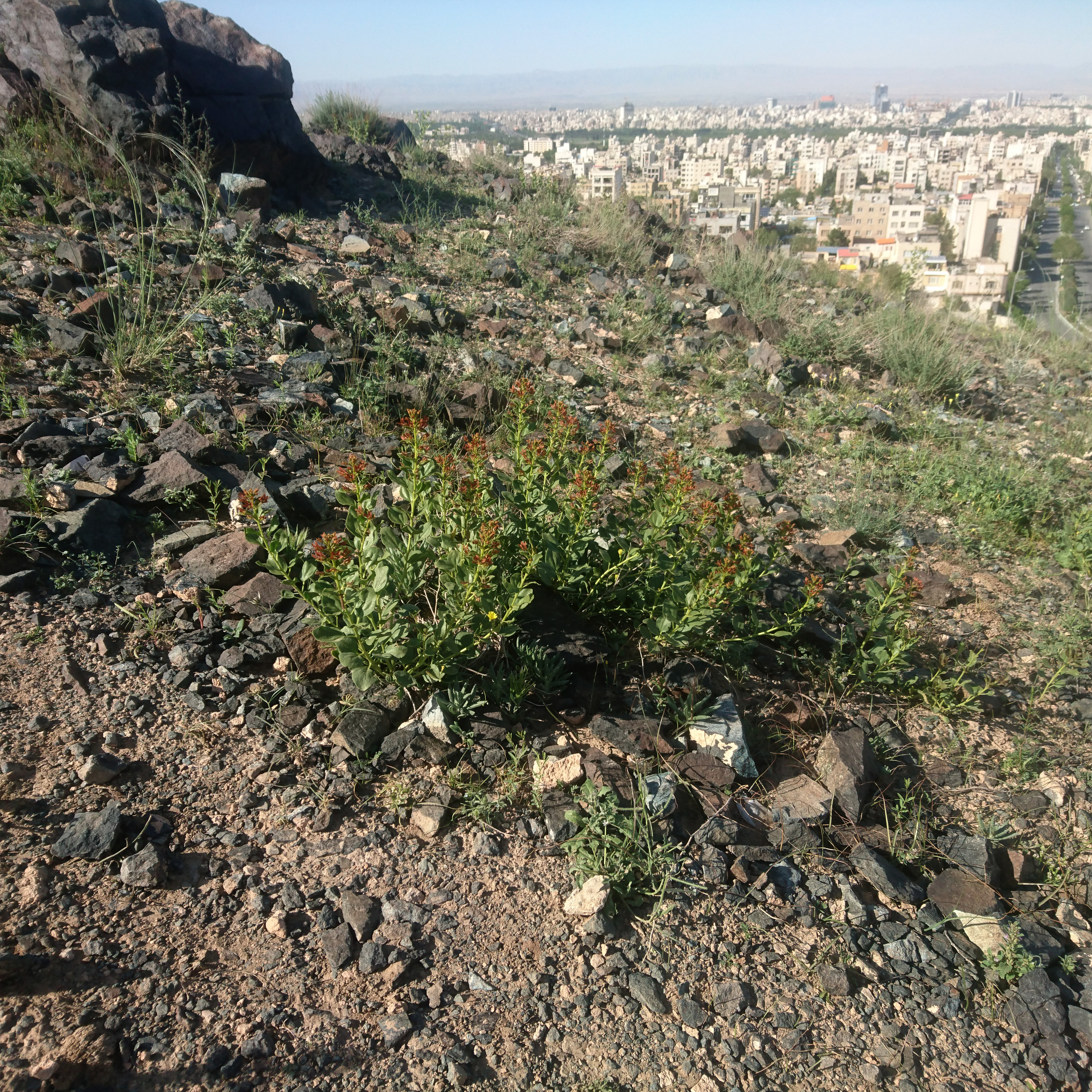

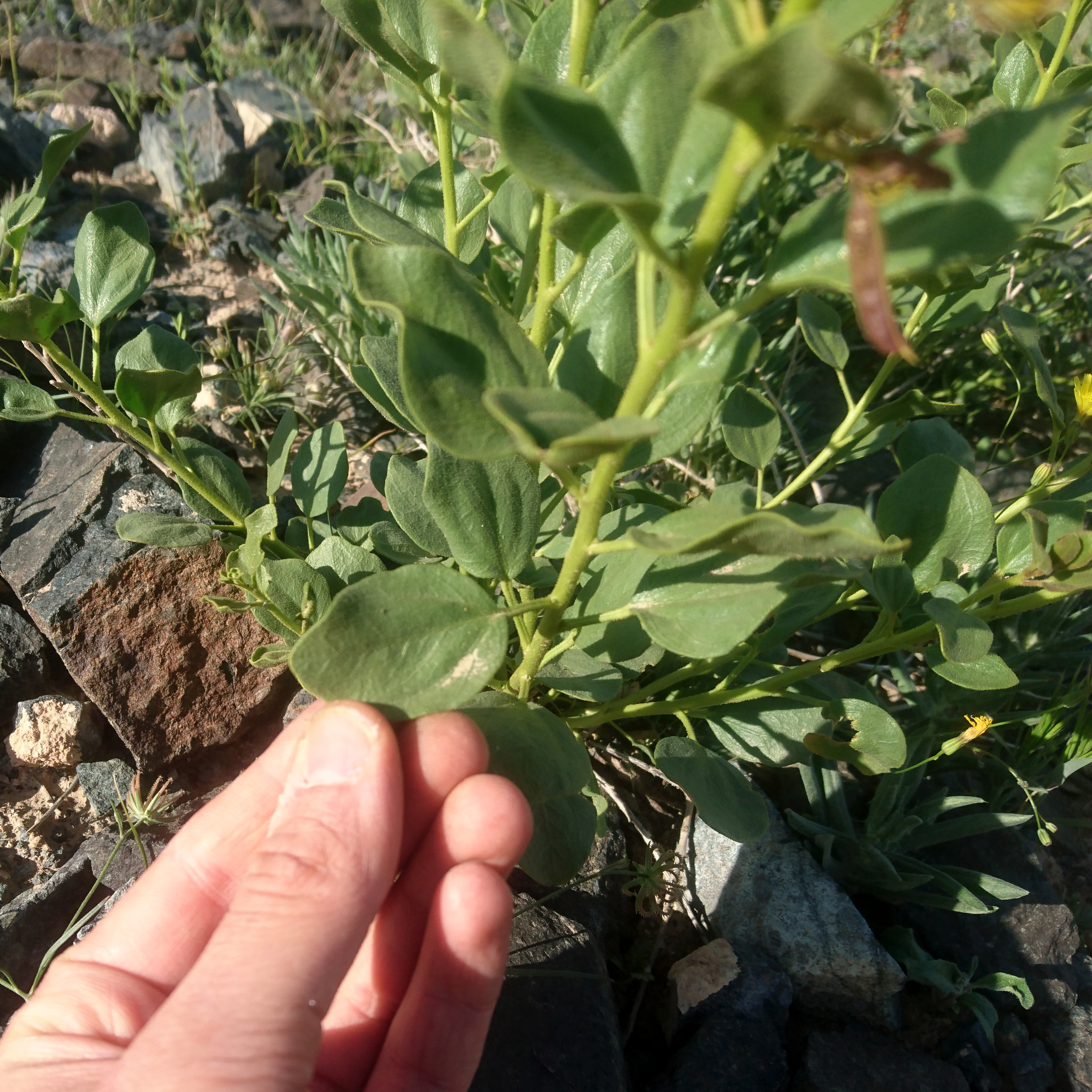

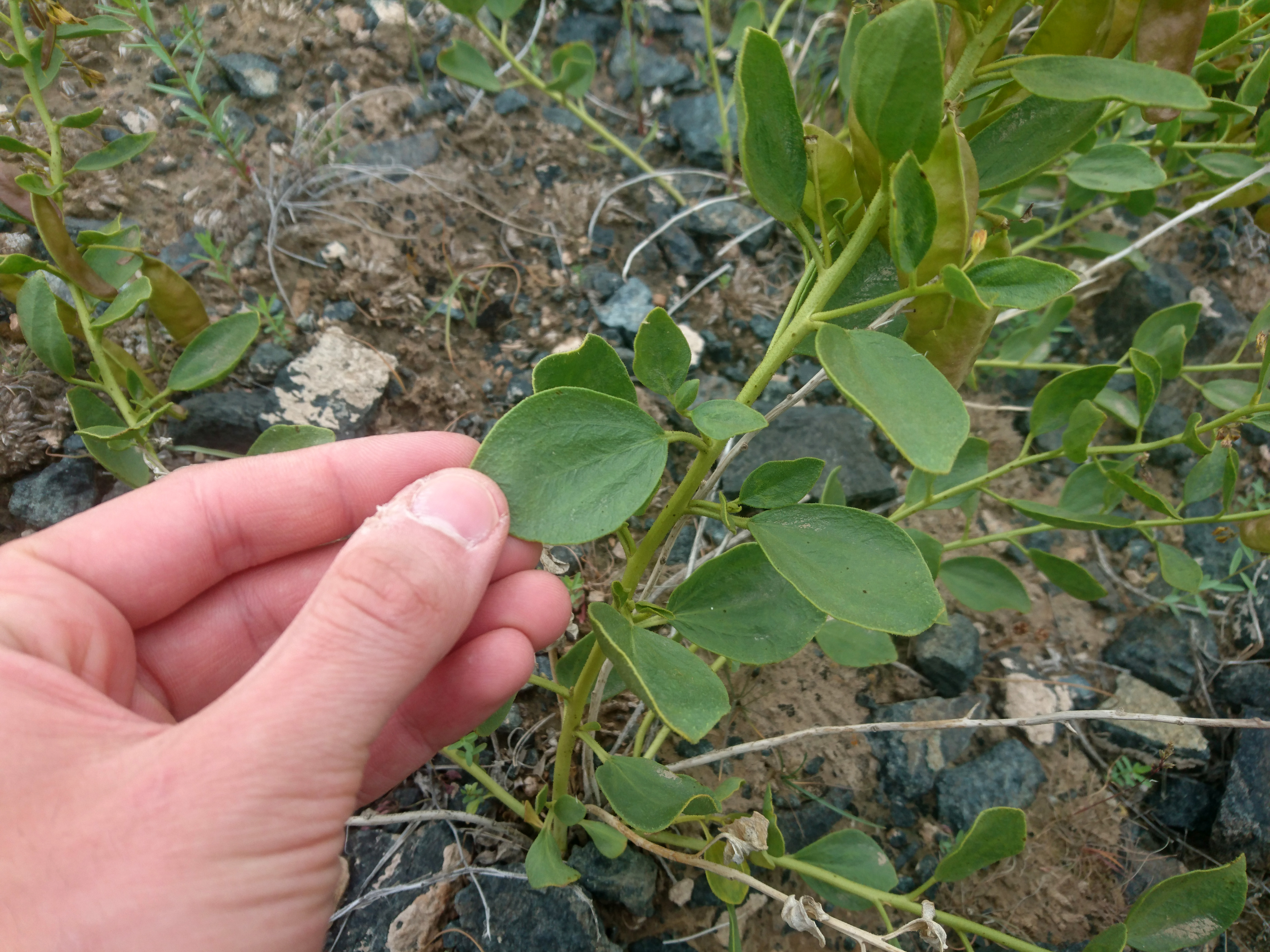

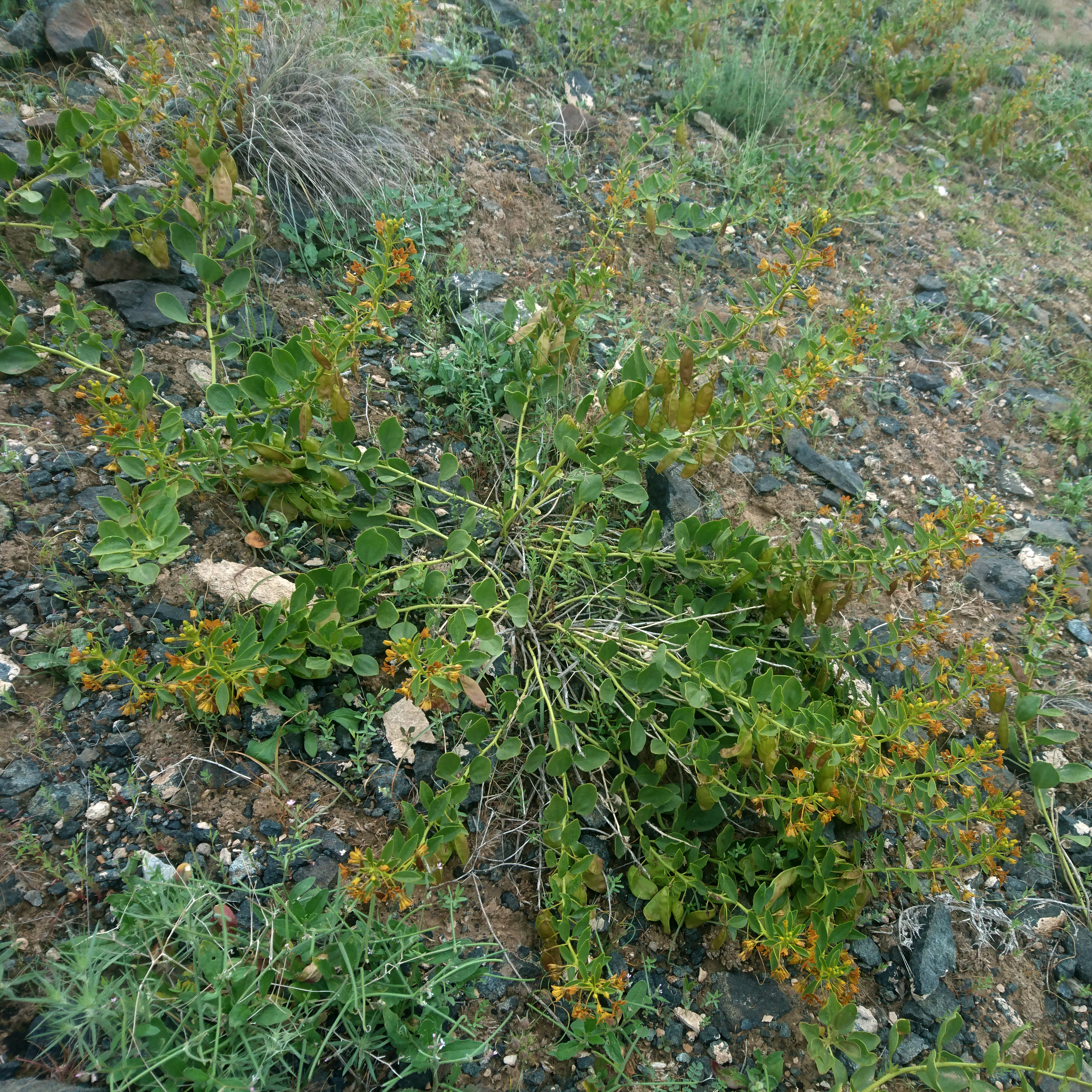

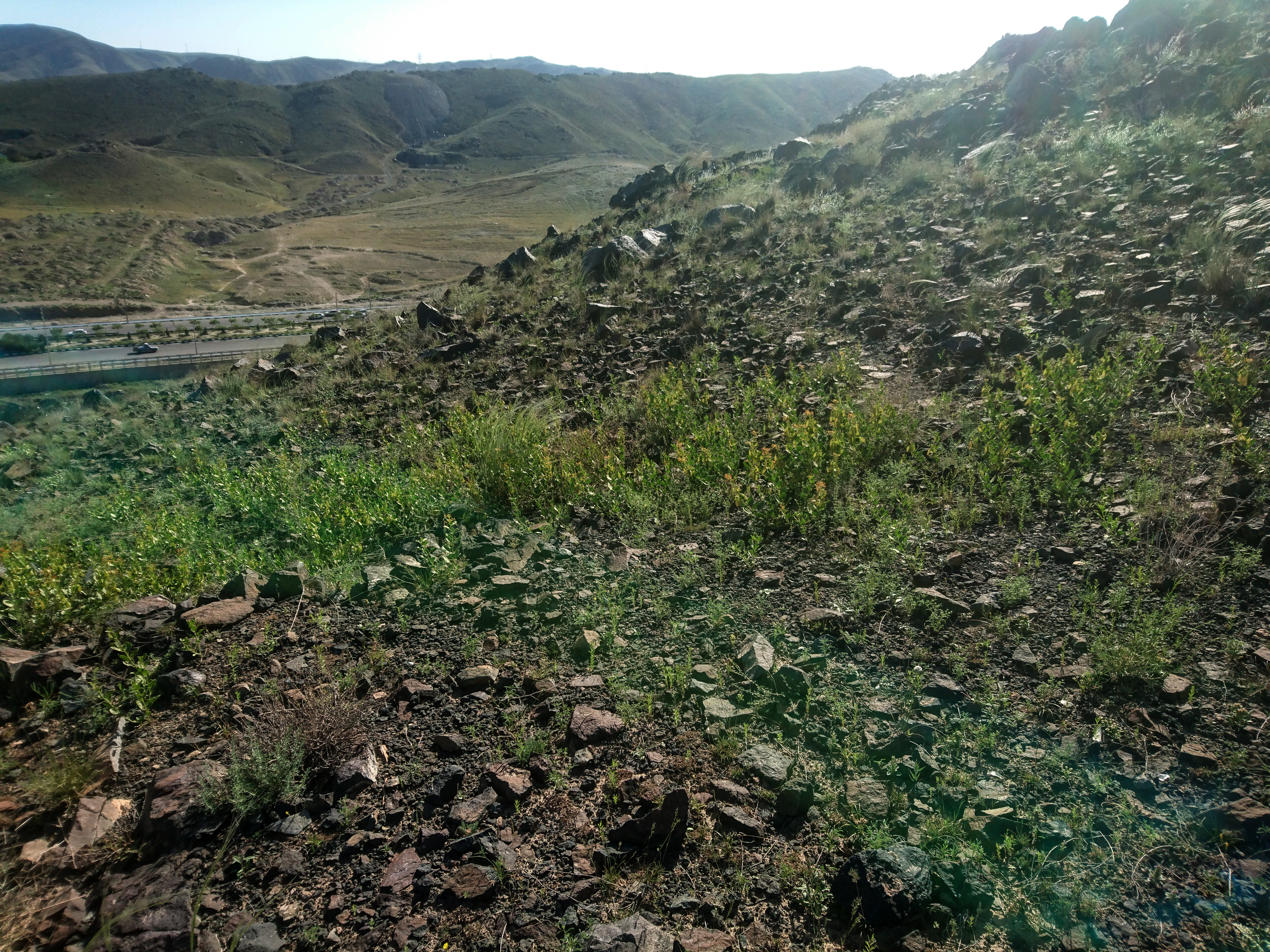

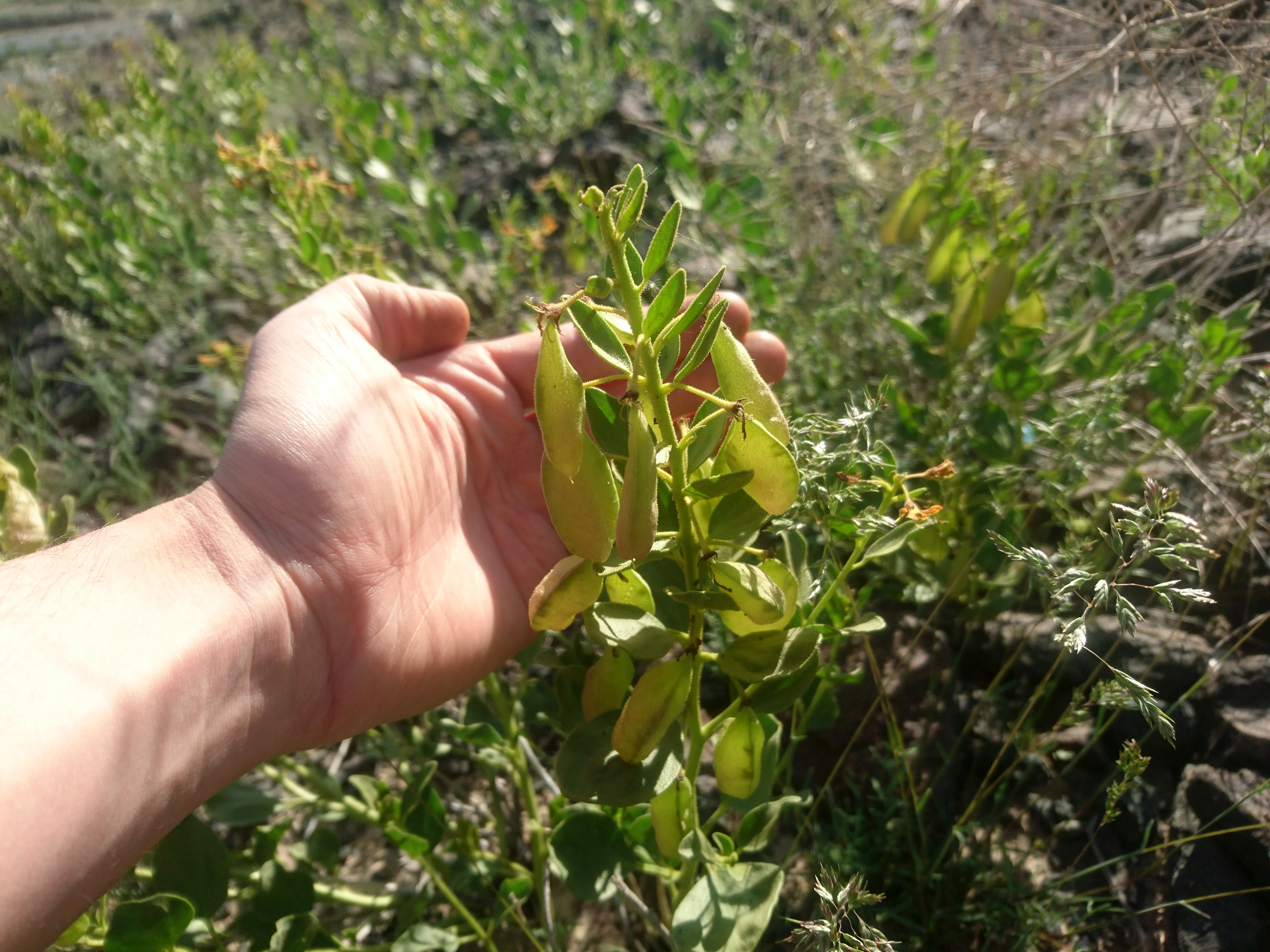

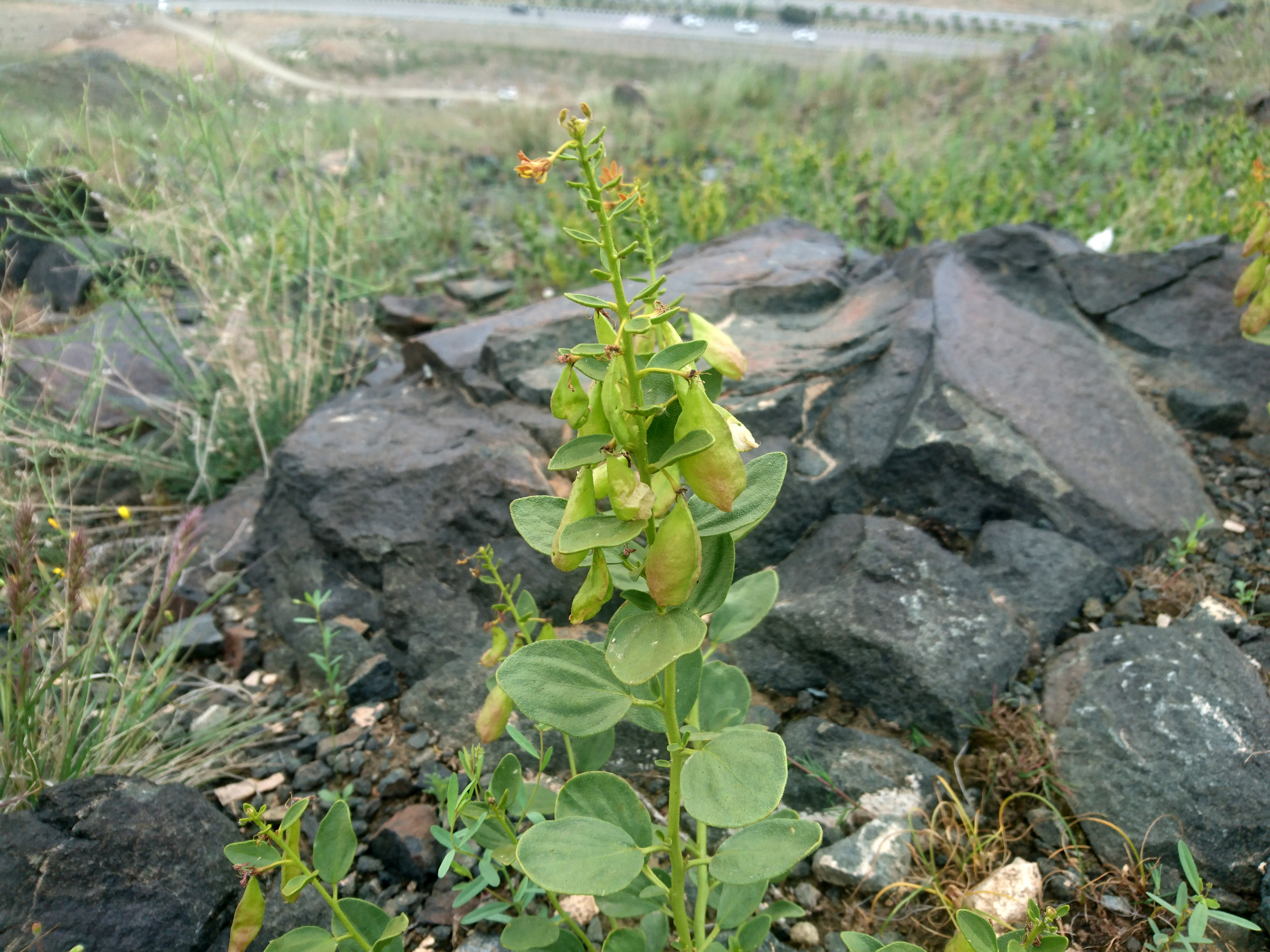

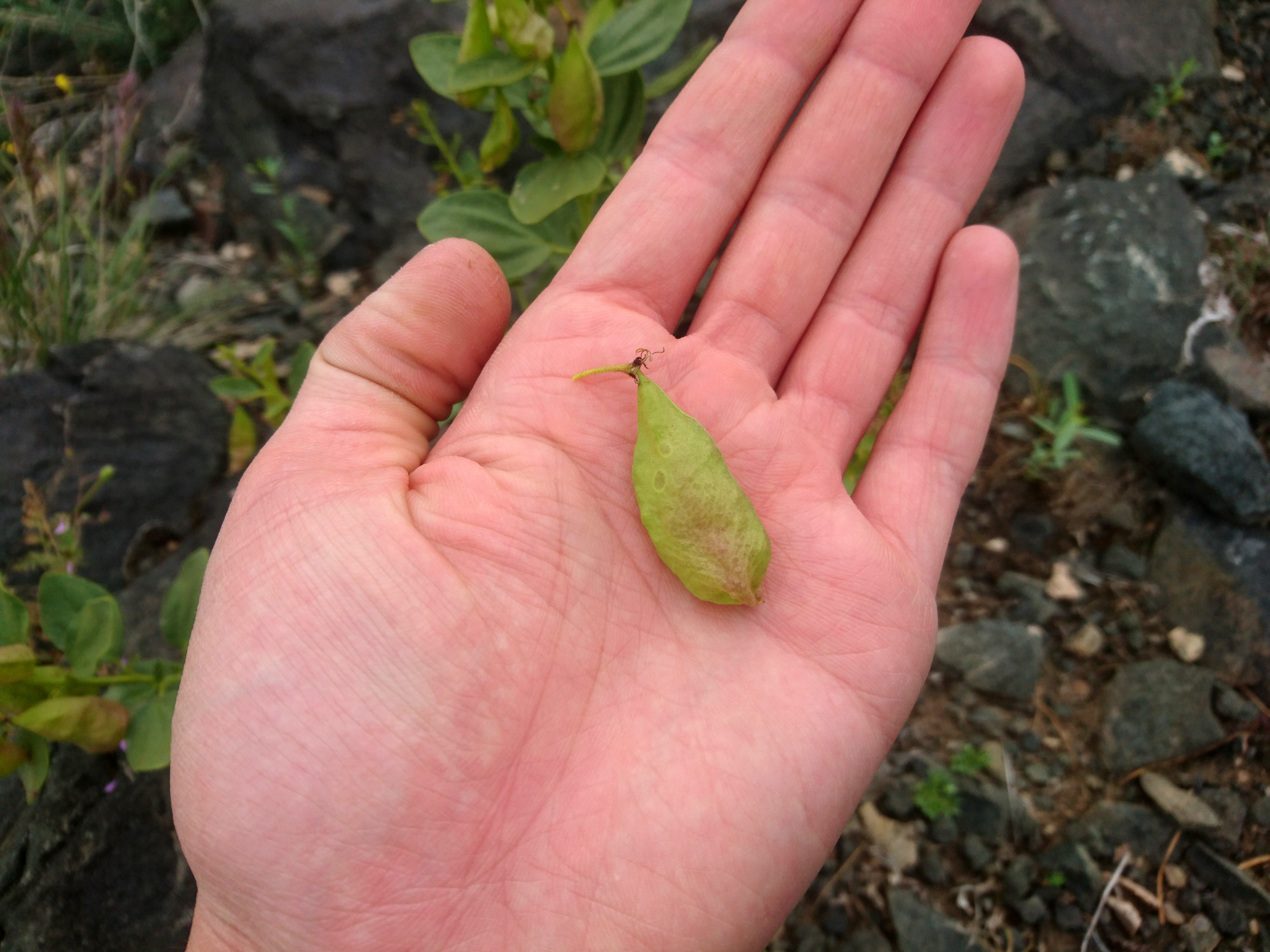
