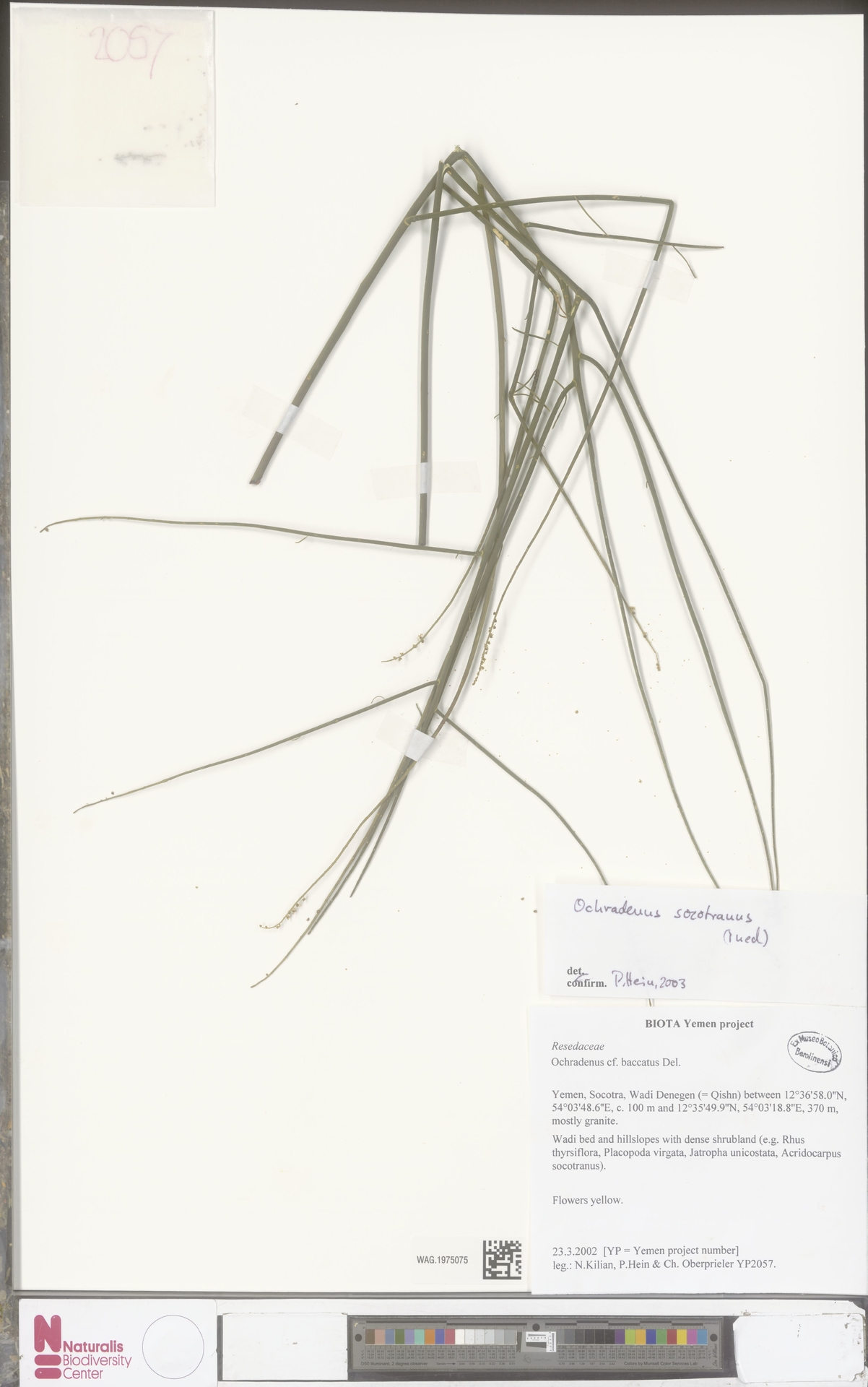

Conservation status
- Least Concern (IUCN 3.1)

Scientific classification
- Kingdom: Plantae
- Clade: Tracheophytes
- Clade: Angiosperms
- Clade: Eudicots
- Clade: Rosids
- Order: Brassicales
- Family: Resedaceae
- Genus: Ochradenus
- Species: O. socotranus

Binomial name
- Ochradenus socotranus A.G.Mill. (2004)

= Ochradenus socotranus =

Species of flowering plant

Ochradenus socotranus is a species of plant in the Resedaceae family. It is a shrub endemic to the islands of Socotra and Samhah in Yemen's Socotra Archipelago. Its natural habitat is dry rocky slopes from 10 to 700 metres elevation.

The species is most closely related to Ochradenus arabicus Chaudhary, Hillc. and A.G.Mill. from the Arabian Peninsula and O. baccatus Del. from the Arabian Peninsula and northeastern Africa. It is dioecious like O. arabicus, but differs in having fleshy fruits and dull rather than glossy seeds. O. baccatus has hermaphrodite flowers and rugose seeds.
