= S. clusii =

S. clusii may refer to:

- Salvia clusii (disambiguation), several different sage plants
- Sesamoides clusii; a flowering plant in the family Resedaceae; see Sesamoides
- Spartium clusii, the bridal broom
