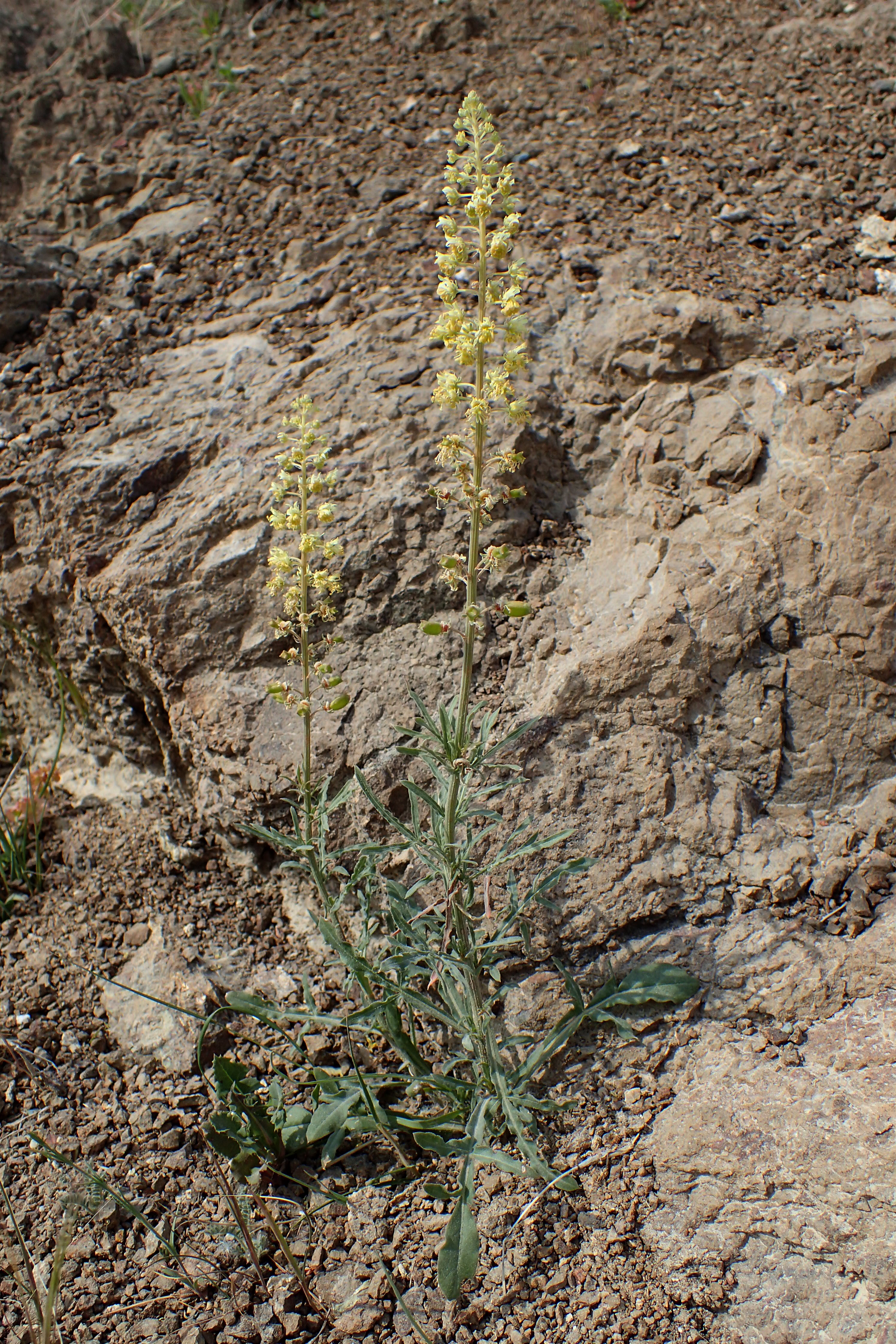
- Reseda minoica in Analiontas, Cyprus

Scientific classification
- Kingdom: Plantae
- Clade: Tracheophytes
- Clade: Angiosperms
- Clade: Eudicots
- Clade: Rosids
- Order: Brassicales
- Family: Resedaceae
- Genus: Reseda
- Species: R. minoica

Binomial name
- Reseda minoica Martín-Bravo & Jim. Mejías, 2013

= Reseda minoica =

Species of flowering plant

Reseda minoica is a species of flowering plant of the genus Reseda found in the eastern Mediterranean region. It was described in 2013 by Santiago Martín-Bravo and Pedro Jiménez-Mejías at the Pablo de Olavide University in Spain. The species has long been confused with closely related species such as R. odorata, R. orientalis and R. balansae, to which it bears a striking resemblance. However, the species can be differentiated from other species by its floral parts. Taxonomic and molecular analyses have further revealed that it is the maternal species of common mignonette (R. odorata), one of the most common sources of fragrance since Ancient Roman times.

== Discovery and etymology ==
Reseda minoica is endemic to the eastern Mediterranean region, including Turkey, Cyprus and Crete (Gavdos Island). The type specimen was collected from Mersin, southern Turkey, on 28 April 2010, where it is found on the limestone cliffs that border the region's roads, on slopes and rocky grounds. The plant is most abundant near the coast. The specific name is given after the Minoan civilisation, which flourished during the Bronze Age in Crete, and whose cultural influences spread to Cyprus, Anatolia and the Levantine coast. Due to its similarity with other Reseda species, it was misidentified as Redesa orientalis in 2007 by the same scientists who described other species in the genus.

== Description ==
Reseda minoica is easily confused with other species of Reseda as it has similar appearance and is of similar size, although it can be distinguished from other species by its floral parts. It has fewer stamens (12-16), relatively small-sized seed (1.5 mm), and whitish petal. It is an annual or perennial herb up to 1 m (generally between 10–70 cm) tall. Its stem is erect and branches off from its base. The bark is heavily covered with long hairs. The leaves are generally three-lobed and alternately arranged. Inflorescence is racemose. The fruit is oblong and measures about 4.5 mm and 1 mm in circumference. It flowers during March to June.

== Phylogeny and significance ==
Phylogenetic analyses based on internal transcribed spacer (ITS) and trnL-trnF show that Reseda minoica is the ancestor of R. odorata. R. odorata is among the earliest known sources of perfume and has been commercially cultivated since Ancient Roman times. It is still one of the most common ingredients in the cosmetics industry. Thus Reseda minoica is the mother of one of the oldest perfume plants.
