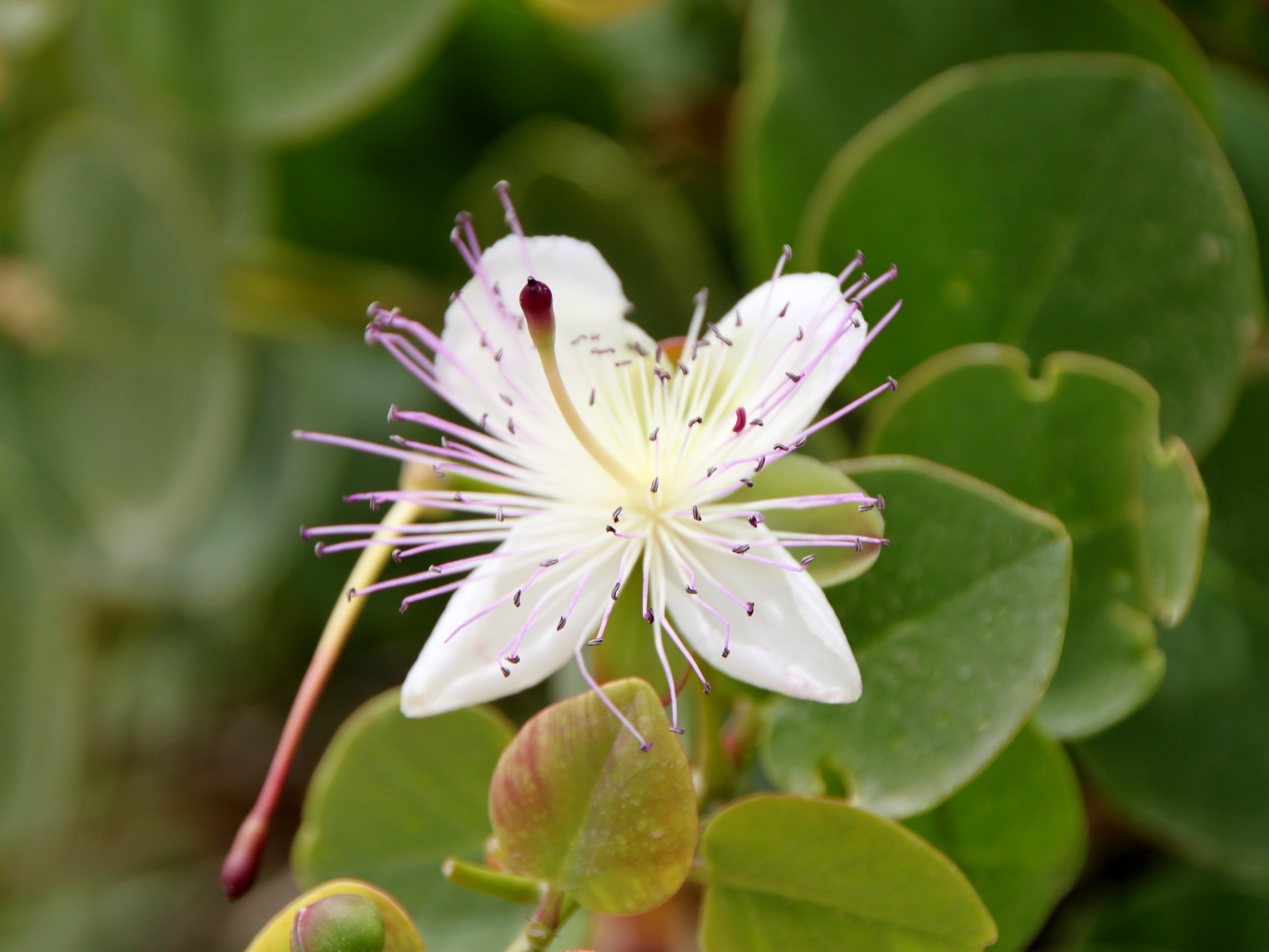

Scientific classification
- Kingdom: Plantae
- Clade: Tracheophytes
- Clade: Angiosperms
- Clade: Eudicots
- Clade: Rosids
- Order: Brassicales
- Family: Capparaceae
- Genus: Capparis
- Species: C. orientalis

Binomial name
- Capparis orientalis Veill.

Synonyms
- Capparis spinosa subsp. rupestris

= Capparis orientalis =

Species of plant

Capparis orientalis is a species of plant in the family Capparaceae.

== Sources ==
This article incorporates text from a free content work. Licensed under CC0 (license statement/permission). Text taken from Capparis orientalis. Encyclopedia of Life.
