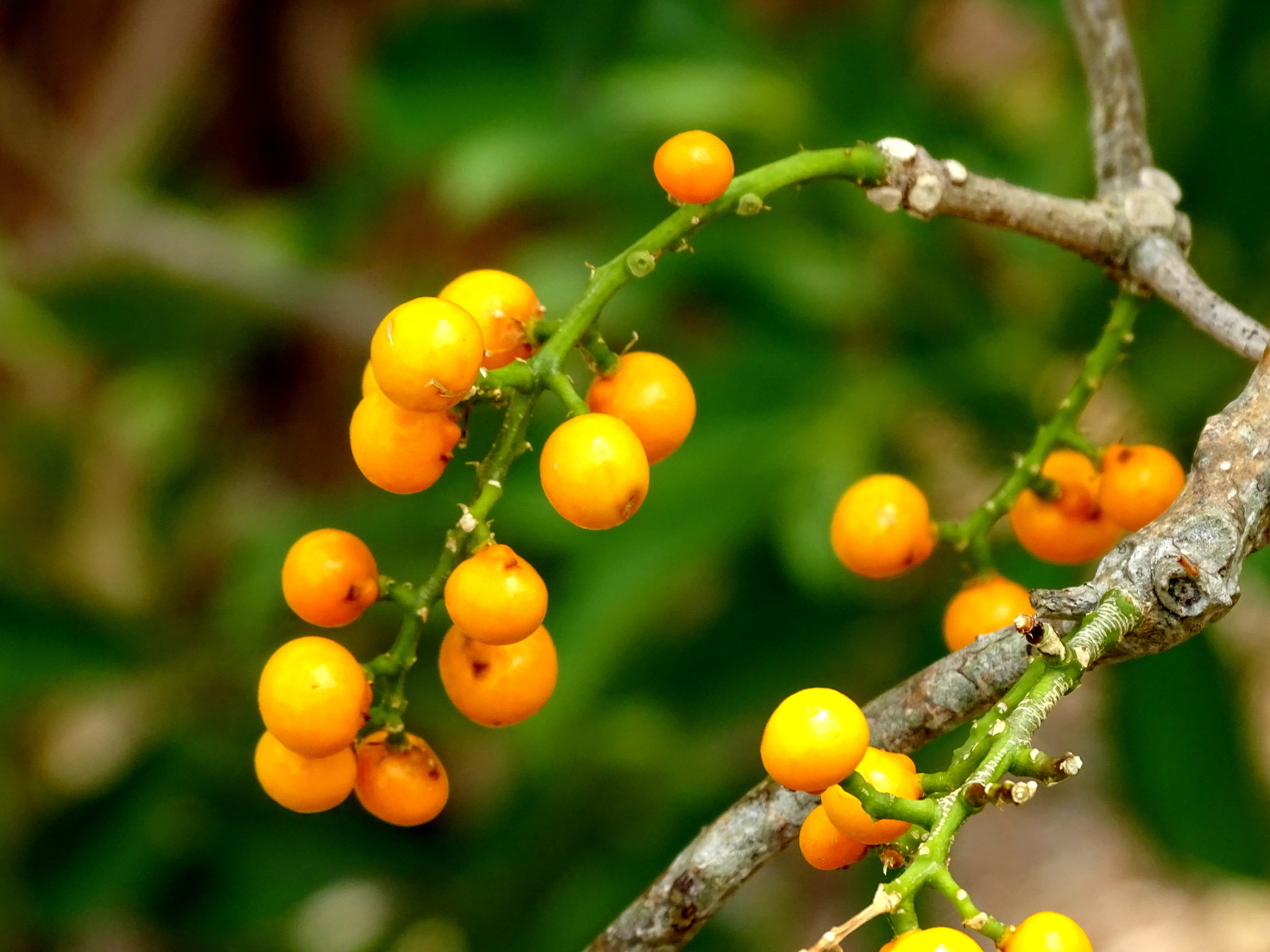
- In Mexico

Conservation status
- Least Concern (IUCN 3.1)

Scientific classification
- Kingdom: Plantae
- Clade: Embryophytes
- Clade: Tracheophytes
- Clade: Angiosperms
- Clade: Eudicots
- Clade: Rosids
- Order: Brassicales
- Family: Resedaceae
- Genus: Forchhammeria
- Species: F. trifoliata

Binomial name
- Forchhammeria trifoliata Radlk. ex Millsp.

Synonyms
- Allophylus roigii Lippold

= Forchhammeria trifoliata =

Species of flowering plant

Forchhammeria trifoliata, synonym Allophylus roigii, the wild craboo or bastard dogwood, is a species of plant in the family Resedaceae. It is native to Mexico, Central America, Jamaica and Cuba.
