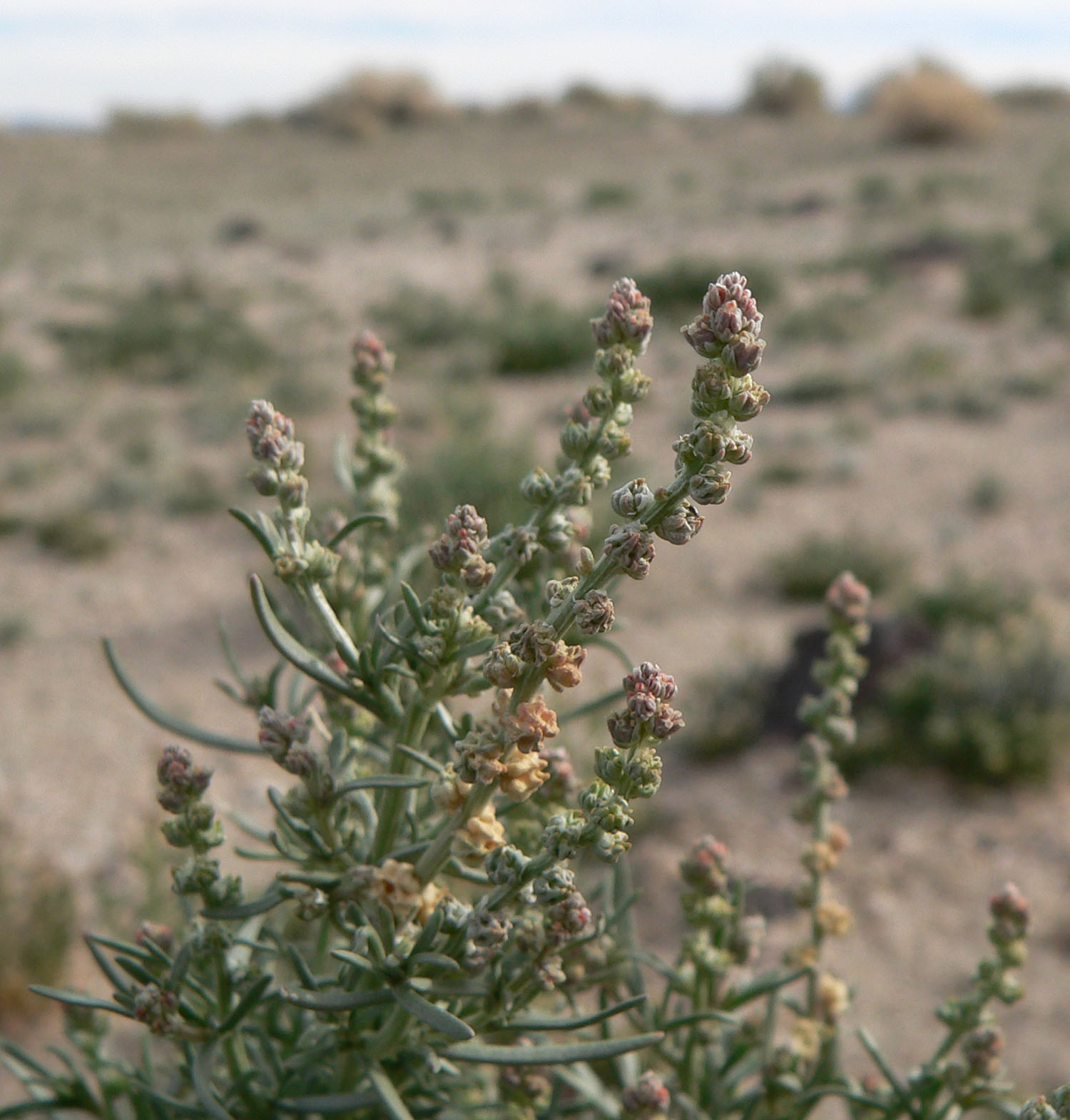

Scientific classification
- Kingdom: Plantae
- Clade: Tracheophytes
- Clade: Angiosperms
- Clade: Eudicots
- Clade: Rosids
- Order: Brassicales
- Family: Resedaceae
- Genus: Oligomeris
- Species: O. linifolia

Binomial name
- Oligomeris linifolia (Vahl) J.F.Macbr.

= Oligomeris linifolia =

Species of flowering plant

Oligomeris linifolia is a species of flowering plant in the small family Resedaceae known by the common name lineleaf whitepuff. It is native to parts of the Middle East and the Indian subcontinent, as well as southern Europe and North Africa, and the southwestern United States and northern Mexico. It grows in many types of habitat, including disturbed areas and saline soils, in deserts, plains, coastline, and other places. It is a fleshy annual plant, producing several erect, ribbed stems 35 to 45 centimeters in maximum height.

The linear or widely lance-shaped leaves are narrow, up to 4.5 centimeters long but only a few millimeters side. The flowers occur in long, erect spikes. Each flower is a rounded, lobed, pocket-like structure with 4 curving sepals and usually two whitish petals which may be partially fused together. The fruit is a capsule a few millimeters long containing tiny shiny black seeds.
