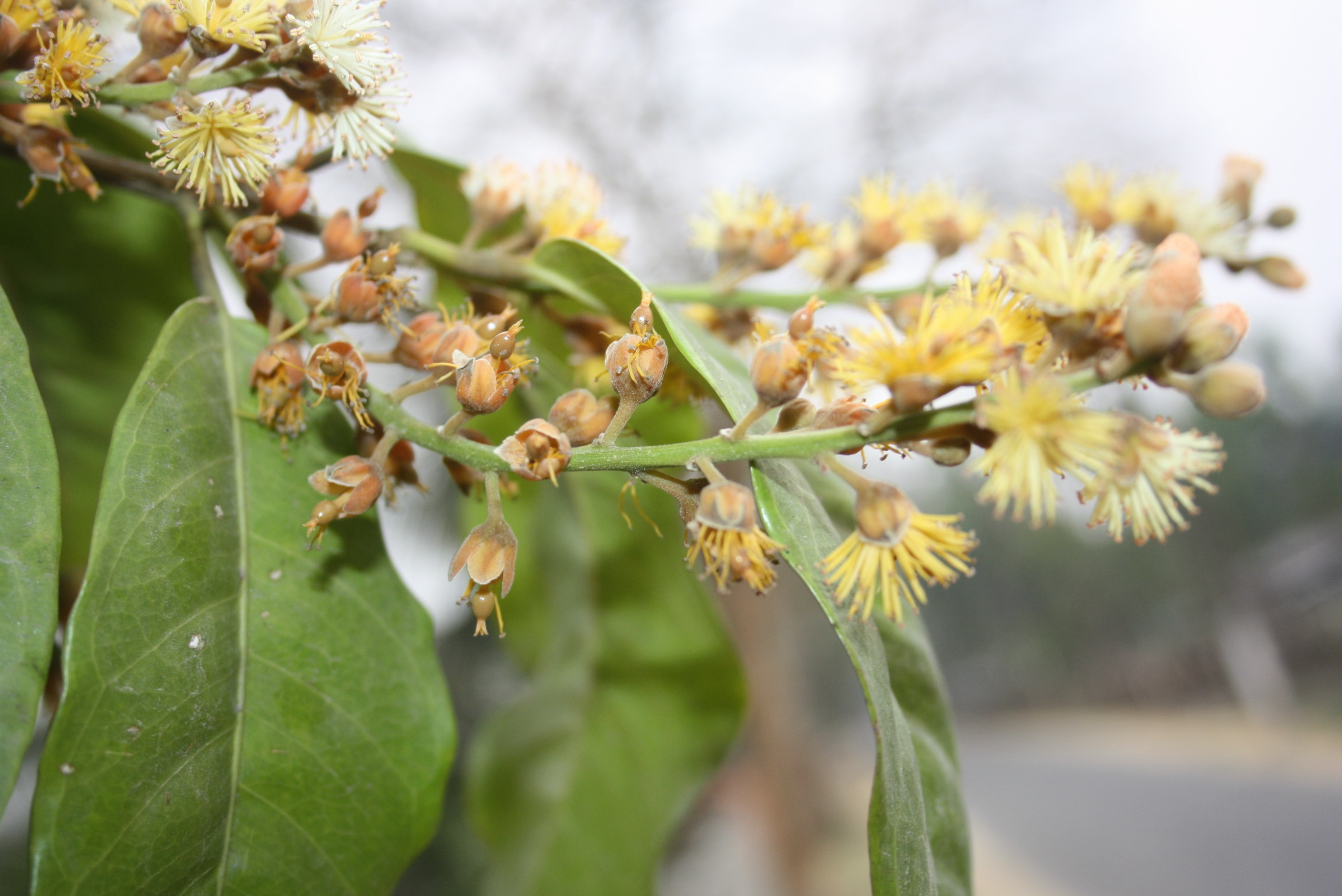
- Stixis suaveolens flowers

Scientific classification
- Kingdom: Plantae
- Clade: Embryophytes
- Clade: Tracheophytes
- Clade: Spermatophytes
- Clade: Angiosperms
- Clade: Eudicots
- Clade: Rosids
- Order: Brassicales
- Family: Resedaceae
- Genus: Stixis
- Species: S. suaveolens

Binomial name
- Stixis suaveolens (Roxb.) Baill.

Synonyms
- Roydsia suaveolens Roxb.

= Stixis suaveolens =

Species of flowering plant

Stixis suaveolens is a species of liana in the family Resedaceae; no subspecies are listed in the Catalogue of Life. It is found in India, southern China and Indo-China; in Vietnam, it may be called "cây tôn nấm". In Assamese, it is called "Madhoi Maloti".
