= Borthwickia =

Scientific classification
- Kingdom: Plantae
- Clade: Tracheophytes
- Clade: Angiosperms
- Clade: Eudicots
- Clade: Rosids
- Order: Brassicales
- Family: Resedaceae
- Genus: Borthwickia; W.W.Sm.
- Species: B. trifoliata

Binomial name
- Borthwickia trifoliata W.W.Sm.

Species of plant

Borthwickia is genus of flowering plants, containing one species, Borthwickia trifoliata from Yunnan, China and Myanmar. The common name in Chinese is 节蒴木 (jie shuo mu). It is a shrub or small tree with evergreen trifoliate leaves, whitish flowers clustered at the tip of the branches, with many stamens, and thin, knobbly, drooping fruits with many small red seeds.

== Description ==
Borthwickia is a fragrant, evergreen shrub or small tree of 1–6 m (3.3–19.7 ft) high. It has square, light green, later pale yellow branchlets, which are initially covered in dense, short, white hairs, which are lost in the older, cylindrical branches. Leaves are arranged with two on opposite sides of the branchlets, and consist of a usually 5–13 cm (2.0–5.1 in) long leaf stalk and three papery leaflets, each on a stalk of about 1 cm (0.39 in) long. The midveins are raised on the upper surface, flat on the lower surface, where they are also covered in dense white hairs. Each leaflet has seven to nine side veins on each side, and reticulate veinlets in between that are visible from both sides. The top leaflet is usually 8–20 cm (3.1–7.9 in) long and about half as wide. The leaflets at the base are slightly smaller and somewhat asymmetric. Flowers are with several in 8–20 cm (3.1–7.9 in) long racemes at the tip of branchlets, and develop from the base to the tip. The common axis is covered in soft short white hairs, and each flower is set on a 1–1½ cm (0.4–0.6 in) long flower stalk, which is initially in the axil of a 1–1½ cm long narrow bract. The file to eight sepals are whitish in color and fused into a closed tube with short white velvet hair on both surfaces. These split into two lobes when the flower opens, and are quickly shed. The five to eight erect petals are whitish in color and oval to spoon-shaped, 1½–1¾ cm (0.6–0.7 in) long, thick at base and thin at the upper margin, up to half as long as the calyx tube. Both anthers and ovary are set above sepals and petals on a stalk of about ½ cm (0.2 in) long. Sixty to seventy free stamens are 14–20 mm (0.55–0.79 in) long and carry ovate anthers which open with longitudinal slits. Pollen grains are approximately 30 × 22 μm, with three ridges from pole to pole. Nectar is produced by the stalk between the petals and the stamens. The ovary is linear, 1–1½ cm (0.4–0.6 in) long, towards the tip with four to six grooves and ridges, and four to six compartments, in each of which are two rows of ovules attached to the axis at the centre. The stigma at the top is seated and indistinct. The fruit is on a 11–18 mm (0.43–0.71 in) long stalk above the scars of the stamens, and is a drooping, knobbly, angular cylindrical capsule, of 6–9 cm (2.4–3.5 in) long and 4–6 mm (0.16–0.24 in) in diameter, with a 3–5 mm (0.12–0.20 in) long beak at the tip. When ripe, the walls of the fruits are shed in longitudinal strips starting from the base, showing the axis with eight to twelve rows of 2–3 mm (0.079–0.118 in) large, initially red, later red-brown kidney-shaped seeds. The plant can be in flower from April to June, and ripe fruits may be present in August and September.

Borthwickia differs from the other core Brassicales in having opposite leaves and by having four to six fruit compartments (Tirania consequently has four, all others less).

== Taxonomy ==
Borthwickia trifoliata has been described by the Scottish botanist and horticulturalist William Wright Smith in 1911, who thought it to be closely related to Ritchiea, a member of the caper family. Later authors generally retained it in the caper family. It was formerly treated as the sole genus in monotypic flowering plant family Borthwickiaceae. It is now placed in Resedaceae in APG IV (2016). Based on recent DNA-analysis, the genus Borthwickia is an early branch of the reseda family, and based on limited testing, the following tree represent current insights in its relationship.

- core Brassicales
  - - - - - Borthwickia trifoliata
          - all other Resedaceae
        - family Gyrostemonaceae
      - family Pentadiplandraceae
    - - family Tovariaceae
      - - family Capparaceae
        - - family Cleomaceae
          - family Brassicaceae
  - family Emblingiaceae

== Distribution and habitat ==
B. trifoliata is an endemic of the South and South-East of Yunnan (China), and northern and north-eastern Myanmar. It grows in humid valleys, ravines and forests. It has also been found in the Lào Cai Province in the very North of Vietnam.
