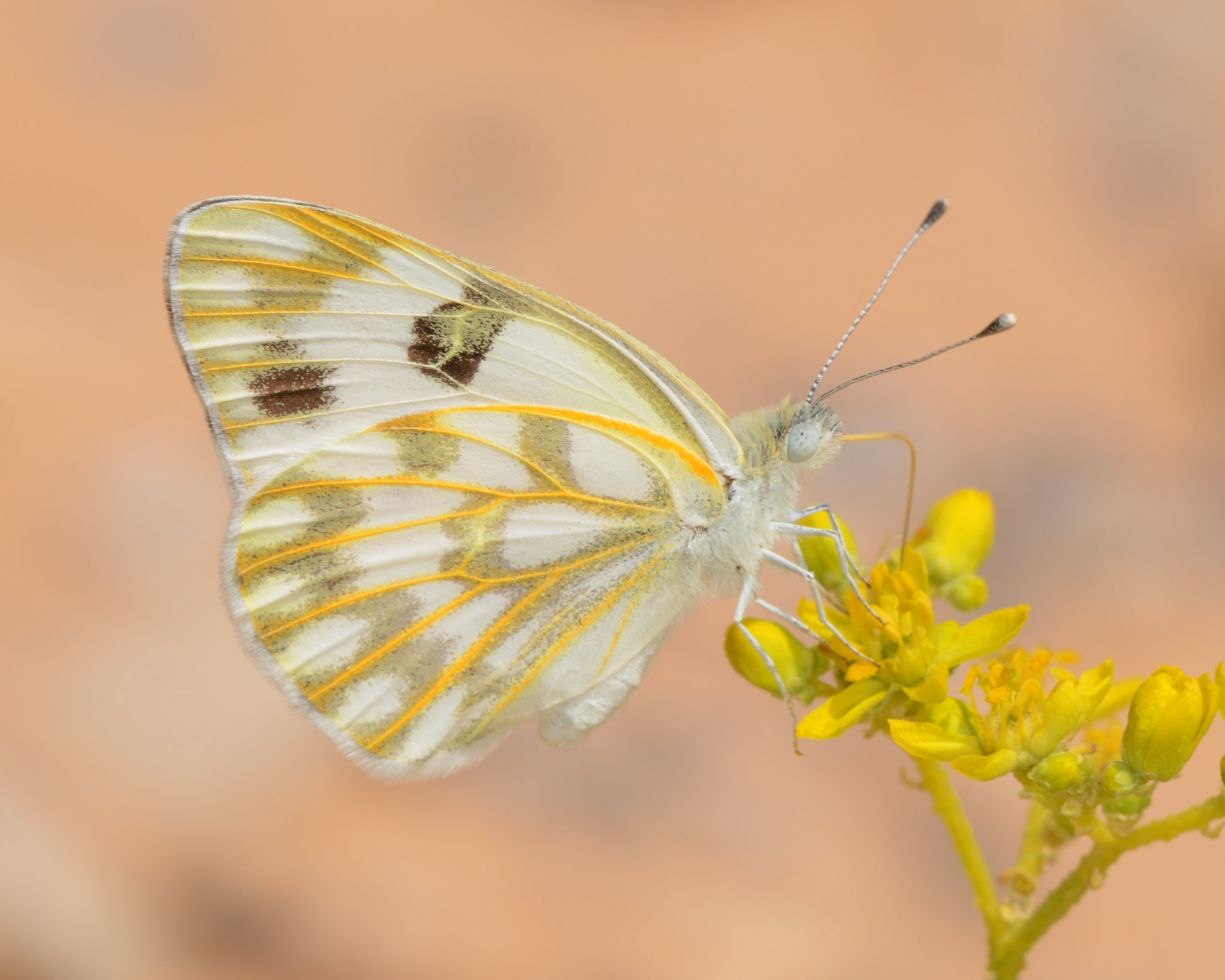

Scientific classification
- Kingdom: Animalia
- Phylum: Arthropoda
- Class: Insecta
- Order: Lepidoptera
- Family: Pieridae
- Genus: Pontia
- Species: P. glauconome

Binomial name
- Pontia glauconome Klug, 1829

= Pontia glauconome =

Species of butterfly

Pontia glauconome, the desert white or desert Bath white, is a butterfly in the family Pieridae. It is found in Mauritania, Senegal, Gambia, Niger, Chad, Sudan, Ethiopia, Somalia, Kenya, Arabia, Kuwait, Egypt, the Middle East, Pakistan, Afghanistan, the southern part of the former Soviet Union, Uzbekistan, Tajikistan and Turkmenistan. The habitat consists of sub-deserts.

The wingspan is 45–50 mm. Adults are on wing from March to October, in three to four generations per year.

The larvae feed on Epicastrum arabicum, Zilla spinosa, Caylusia, Dipterygium, Erucastrum, Moracandia, Diplotaxis, Cleome and Ochradenus species. The pupae have a facultative diapause of at least four years.

== Subspecies ==
- Pontia glauconome glauconome (Mauritania, Senegal, Gambia, Niger, Chad, Sudan, Ethiopia, Somalia, Kenya, Arabia, Egypt, the Middle East, Afghanistan and the southern part of the former Soviet Union)
- Pontia glauconome iranica Bienert, 1870 (Uzbekistan, Tajikistan, Turkmenistan)
