= Stixis obtusifolia =

Scientific classification
- Kingdom: Plantae
- Clade: Embryophytes
- Clade: Tracheophytes
- Clade: Angiosperms
- Clade: Eudicots
- Clade: Rosids
- Order: Brassicales
- Family: Resedaceae
- Genus: Stixis
- Species: S. obtusifolia

Binomial name
- Stixis obtusifolia (Hook.f. & Thomson) Baill.

Synonyms
- Roydsia obtusifolia Hook.f. & Thomson; Stixis harmandiana Pierre

Species of shrub from Southeast Asia

Stixis obtusifolia is a shrub or liana in the Resedaceae family. It is found in parts of Southeast Asia. The wood is used as fuel, the leaves as a tea.

== Description ==
This species grows as a deciduous shrub or liana. It has silvery stems and branches. Leaves are simple, the adult leaves are glabrous, though occasionally with a few hairs on the nerves. The gynophore is shorter than 5 mm and hairy, the ovary is glabrous.

Flowering occurs from November to March, fruiting from January to April.

== Distribution ==
This Southeast Asian species grows in the following countries: Cambodia, Laos, Thailand and Myanmar.

== Habitat, ecology ==
The plant grows in degraded formations.

In the vegetation communities alongside the Mekong in Kratie and Steung Treng Provinces, Cambodia, this taxa is rare in the degraded areas of the riverine community. It grows on soils derived from metamorphic sandstone bedrock, at 20–25 m (66–82 ft) altitude.

== Vernacular names ==
Aw krâpë (av kraboe, ao krâpoeu) (aw="skin", krâpë="crocodile", Khmer) is a name used in Cambodia.

== Uses ==
The wood furnishes firewood. The leaves can give a tea-like drink

== History ==
Henri Ernest Baillon (1827–1895), a French botanist and physician, described the species in 1887 in the journal Bulletin Mensuel de la Société Linnéenne de Paris (Paris).
