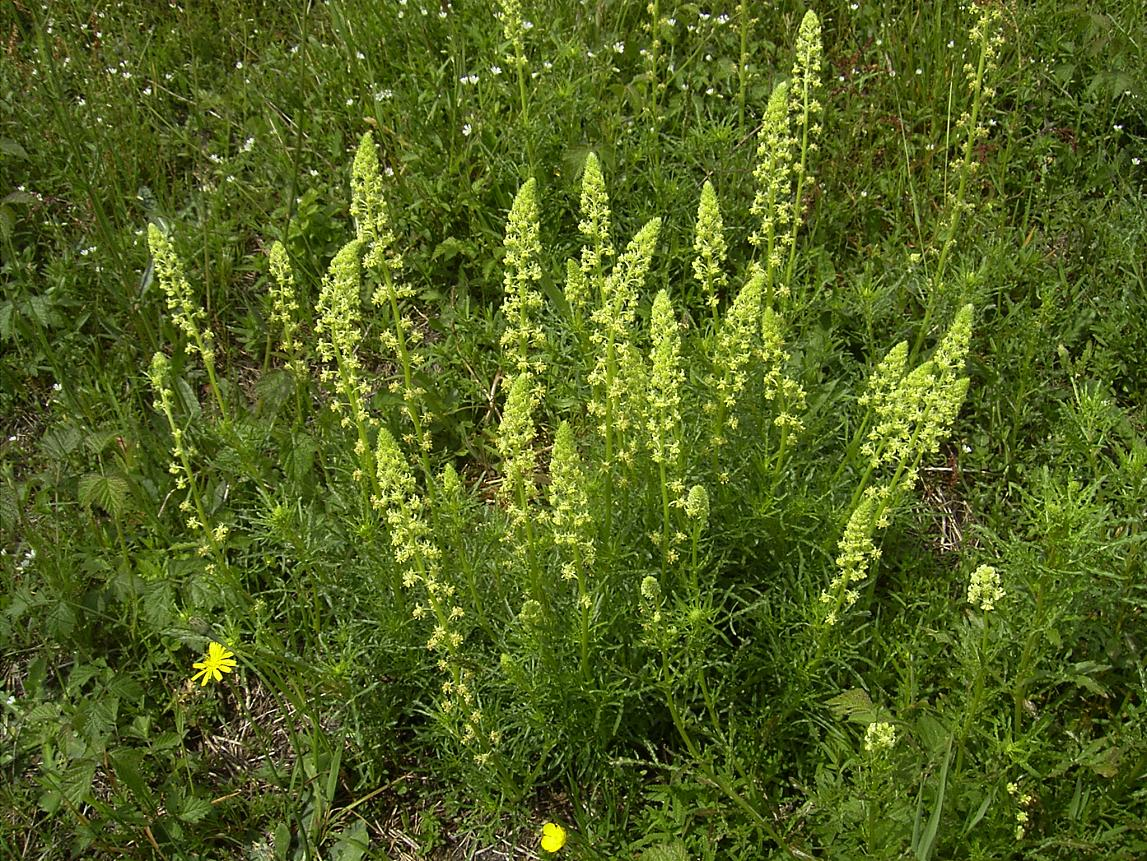

Scientific classification
- Kingdom: Plantae
- Clade: Tracheophytes
- Clade: Angiosperms
- Clade: Eudicots
- Clade: Rosids
- Order: Brassicales
- Family: Resedaceae
- Genus: Reseda
- Species: R. lutea

Binomial name
- Reseda lutea L.

= Reseda lutea =

Species of flowering plant

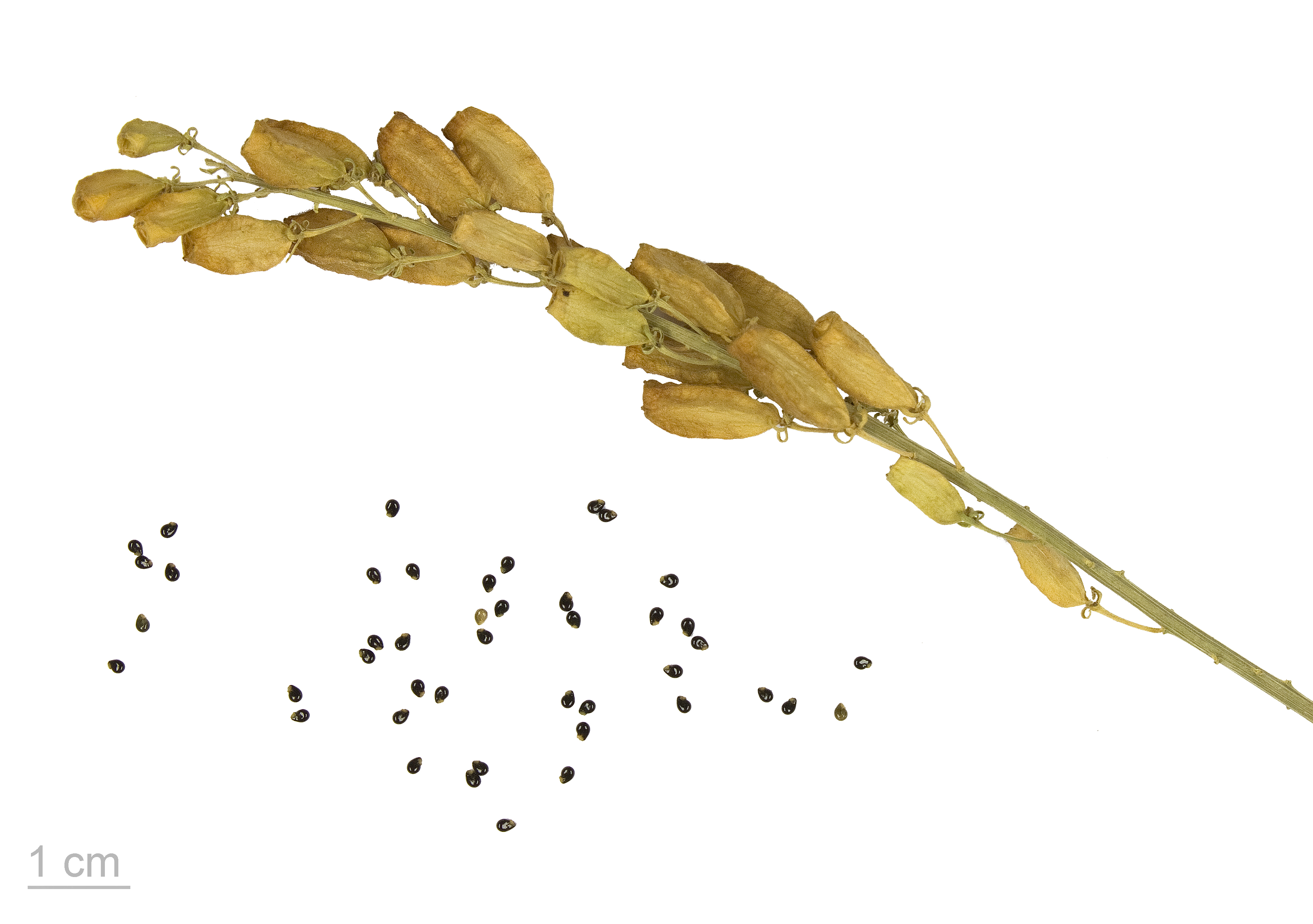
Reseda lutea - MHNT

Reseda lutea, the yellow mignonette or wild mignonette, is a species of fragrant herbaceous flowering plant. Its leaves and flowers have been used to make a yellow dye called "weld" since the first millennium BC, although the related plant Reseda luteola was more widely used for that purpose.

A native of Eurasia and North Africa, the plant is present on other continents as an introduced species and a common weed. In Australia it is a noxious weed and pest of agricultural crops.
