= Reseda viridis =

Conservation status
- Least Concern (IUCN 3.1)

Scientific classification
- Kingdom: Plantae
- Clade: Tracheophytes
- Clade: Angiosperms
- Clade: Eudicots
- Clade: Rosids
- Order: Brassicales
- Family: Resedaceae
- Genus: Reseda
- Species: R. viridis

Binomial name
- Reseda viridis Balf.f. (1882)

Species of plant

Reseda viridis is a species of plant in the family Resedaceae. It is a subshrub or shrub endemic to the islands of Socotra and Abd al Kuri in Yemen's Socotra Archipelago. Its natural habitat is rocky dry rocky slopes and cliffs from sea level to 700 metres elevation.
