= Stixis scandens =

Scientific classification
- Kingdom: Plantae
- Clade: Tracheophytes
- Clade: Angiosperms
- Clade: Eudicots
- Clade: Rosids
- Order: Brassicales
- Family: Resedaceae
- Genus: Stixis
- Species: S. scandens

Binomial name
- Stixis scandens Lour.

Synonyms
- Stixis parviflora Baill.; Stixis manipurensis D.B. Deb & R.C. Rout; Stixis flavescens Baill.; Stixis elongata Baill.; Roydsia parviflora Griff.

Species of flowering plant

Stixis scandens is a species of flowering plant in the family Resedaceae. This liana is the type species in its genus and no subspecies are listed in the Catalogue of Life. In Vietnam it may be called quã dây leo.

== Distribution ==
It is native to Assam, Cambodia, South-Central China, India, Laos, Myanmar, Vietnam.
