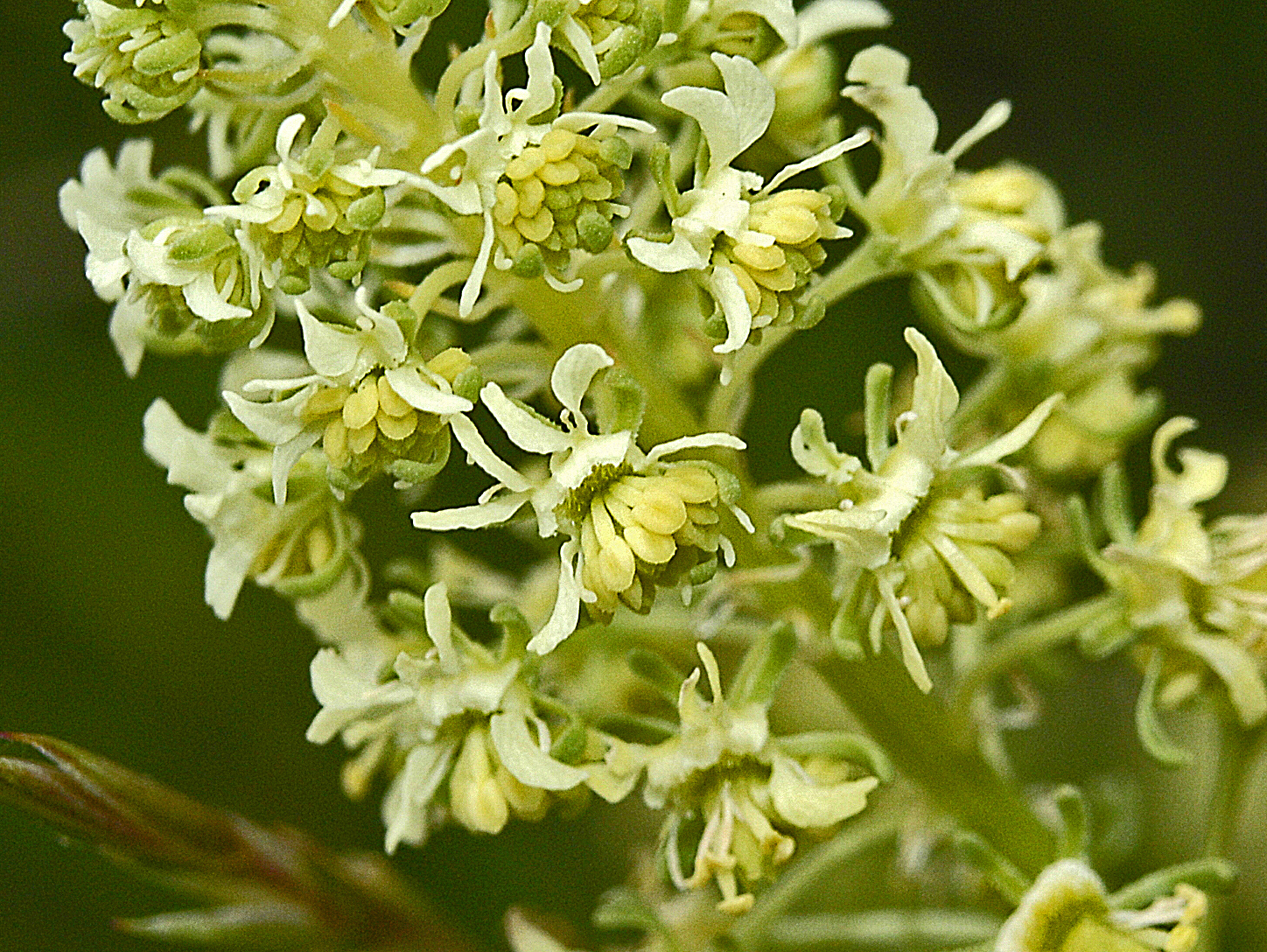
- Flowers of Reseda phyteuma

Scientific classification
- Kingdom: Plantae
- Clade: Tracheophytes
- Clade: Angiosperms
- Clade: Eudicots
- Clade: Rosids
- Order: Brassicales
- Family: Resedaceae
- Genus: Reseda
- Species: R. phyteuma

Binomial name
- Reseda phyteuma L.

= Reseda phyteuma =

Species of flowering plant

Reseda phyteuma, common name rampion mignonette or corn mignonette, is a species of flowering plant in the family Resedaceae.

== Description ==
Reseda phyteuma can reach a height of 10–50 centimetres (3.9–19.7 in). It is an annual or perennial plant with erect stems, branched at the base. Leaves are entire, the upper ones with two lateral lobes. The inflorescence, which may take up most of the upper stem, is densely packed with many greenish-white flowers with six petals. They bloom from April to September.

== Distribution ==
Reseda phyteuma is present from Central and Southern Europe to Western Asia and North Africa. It is naturalized in Britain.

== Habitat ==
This species can be found in wasteland, walls and vineyards at elevation of 0–1,000 metres (0–3,281 ft) above sea level.

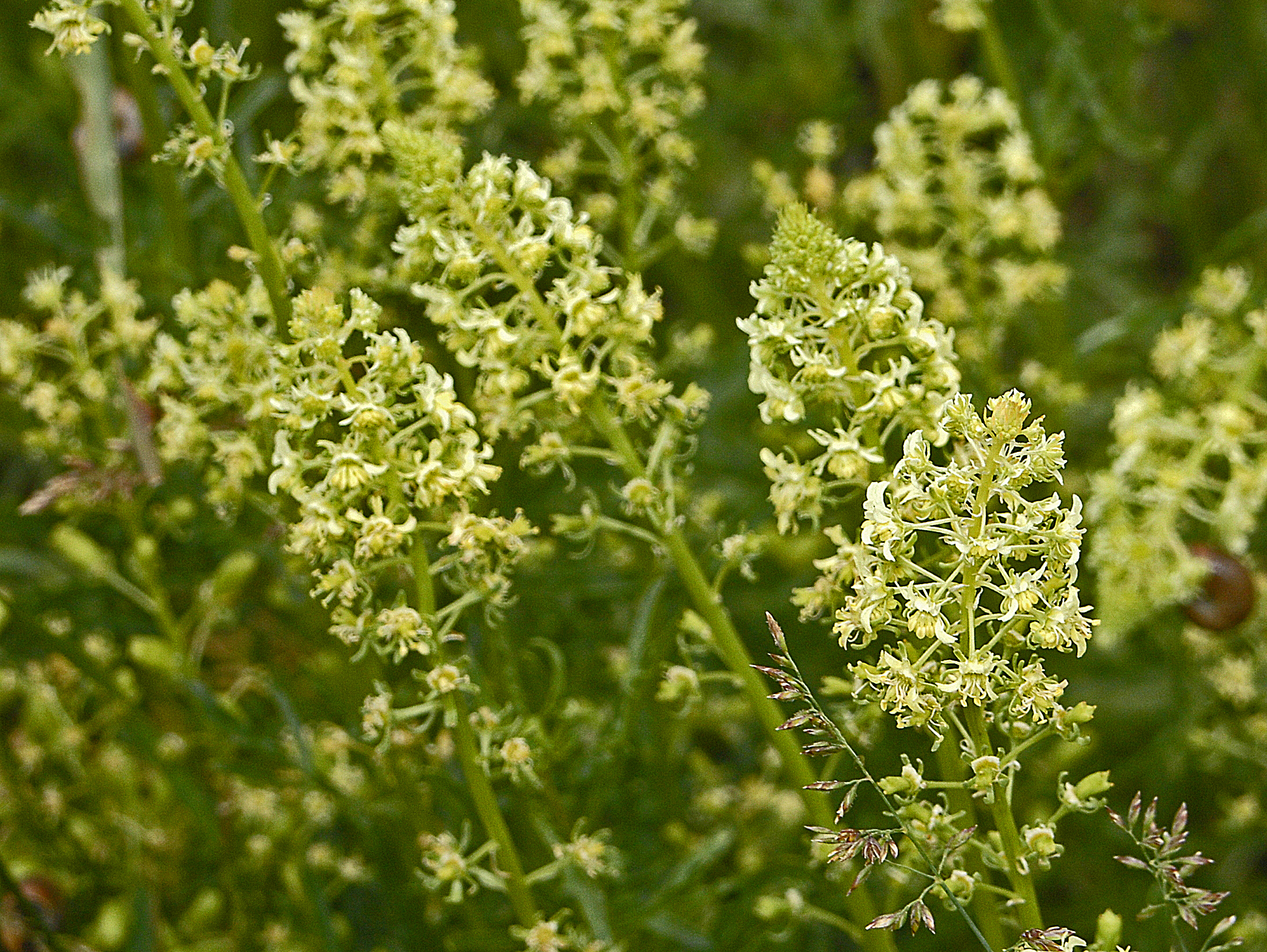
Inflorescences of Reseda phyteuma

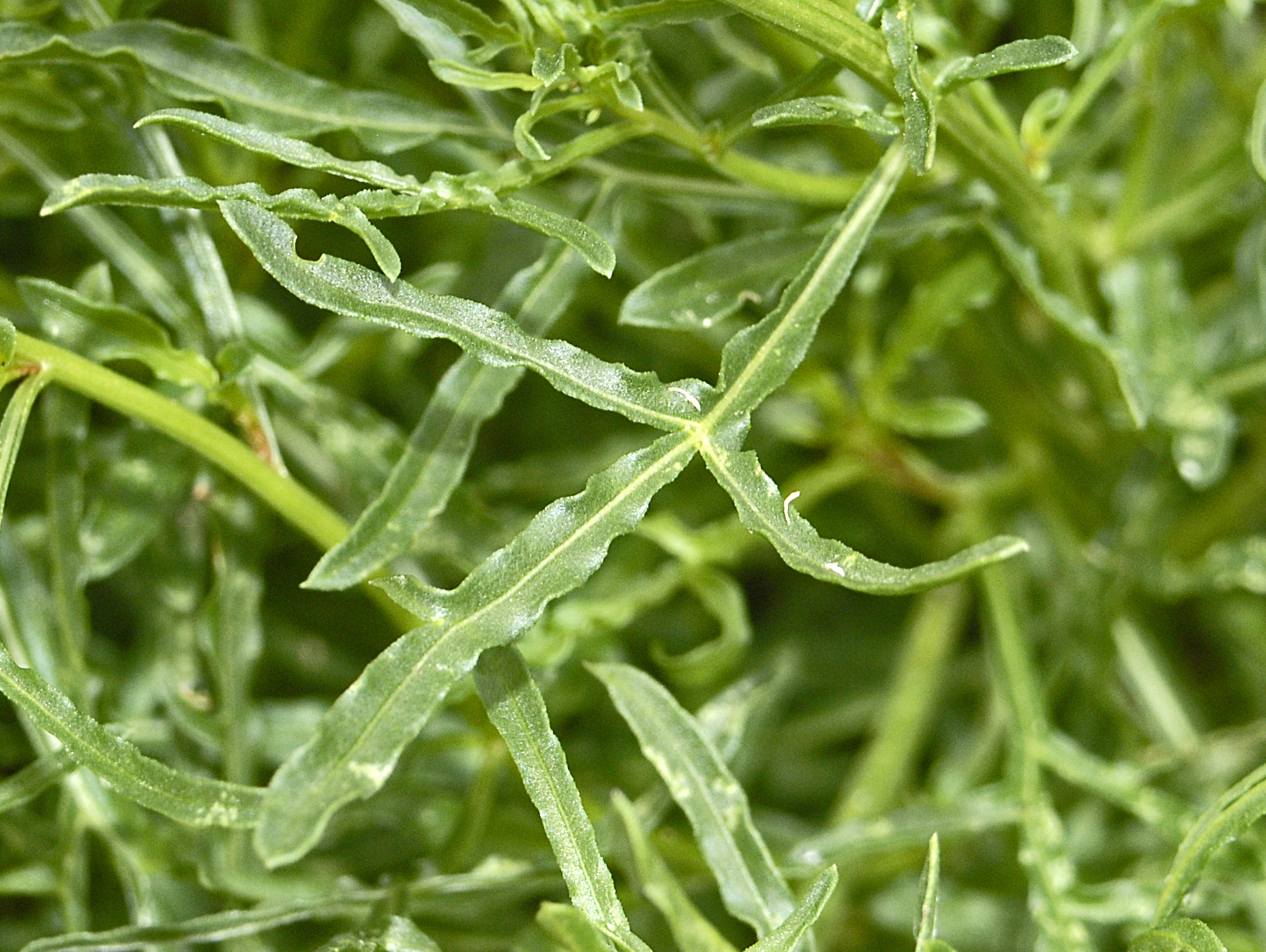
Leaf
