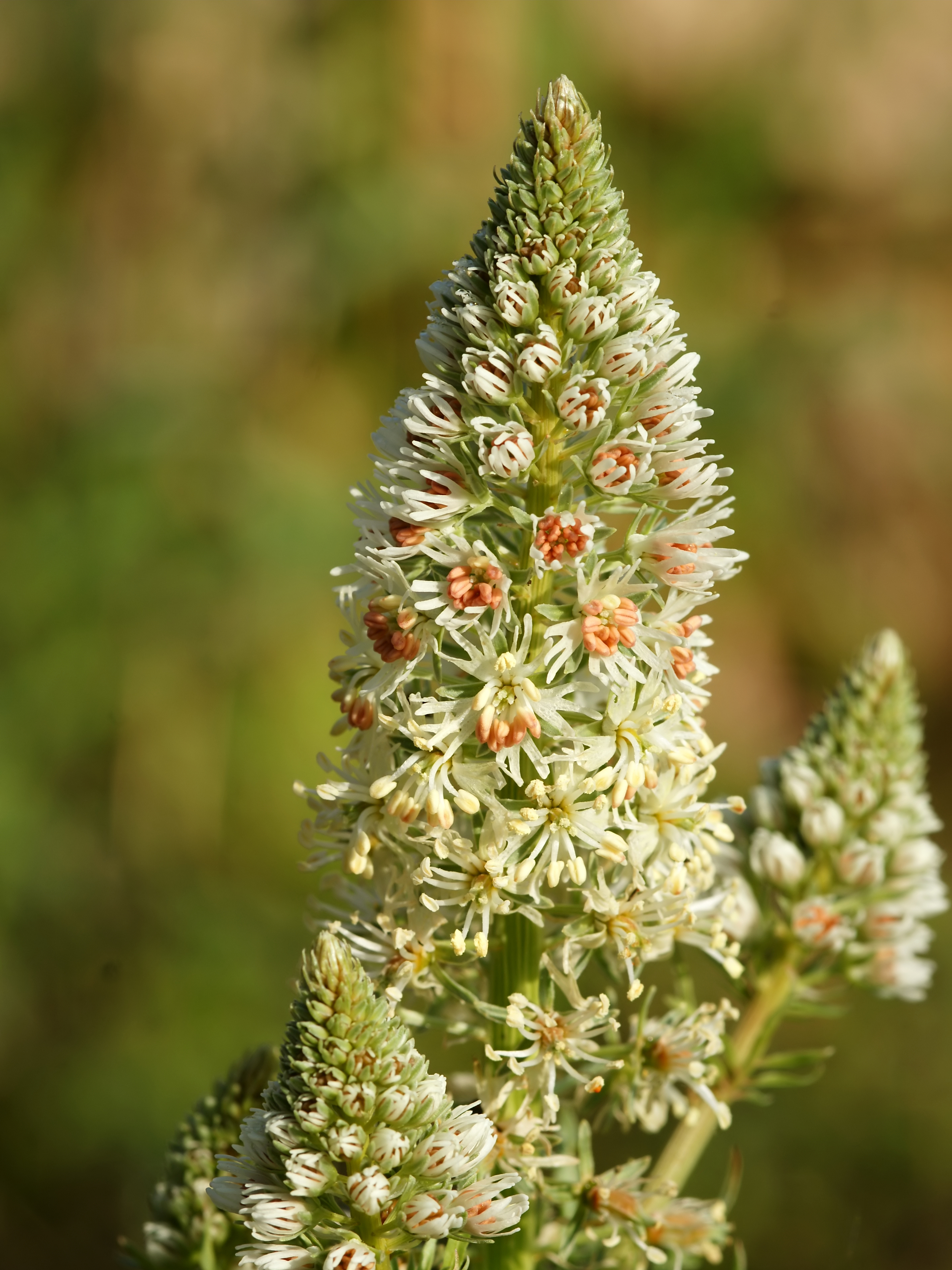

Scientific classification
- Kingdom: Plantae
- Clade: Tracheophytes
- Clade: Angiosperms
- Clade: Eudicots
- Clade: Rosids
- Order: Brassicales
- Family: Resedaceae
- Genus: Reseda
- Species: R. alba

Binomial name
- Reseda alba L.

= Reseda alba =

Species of flowering plant

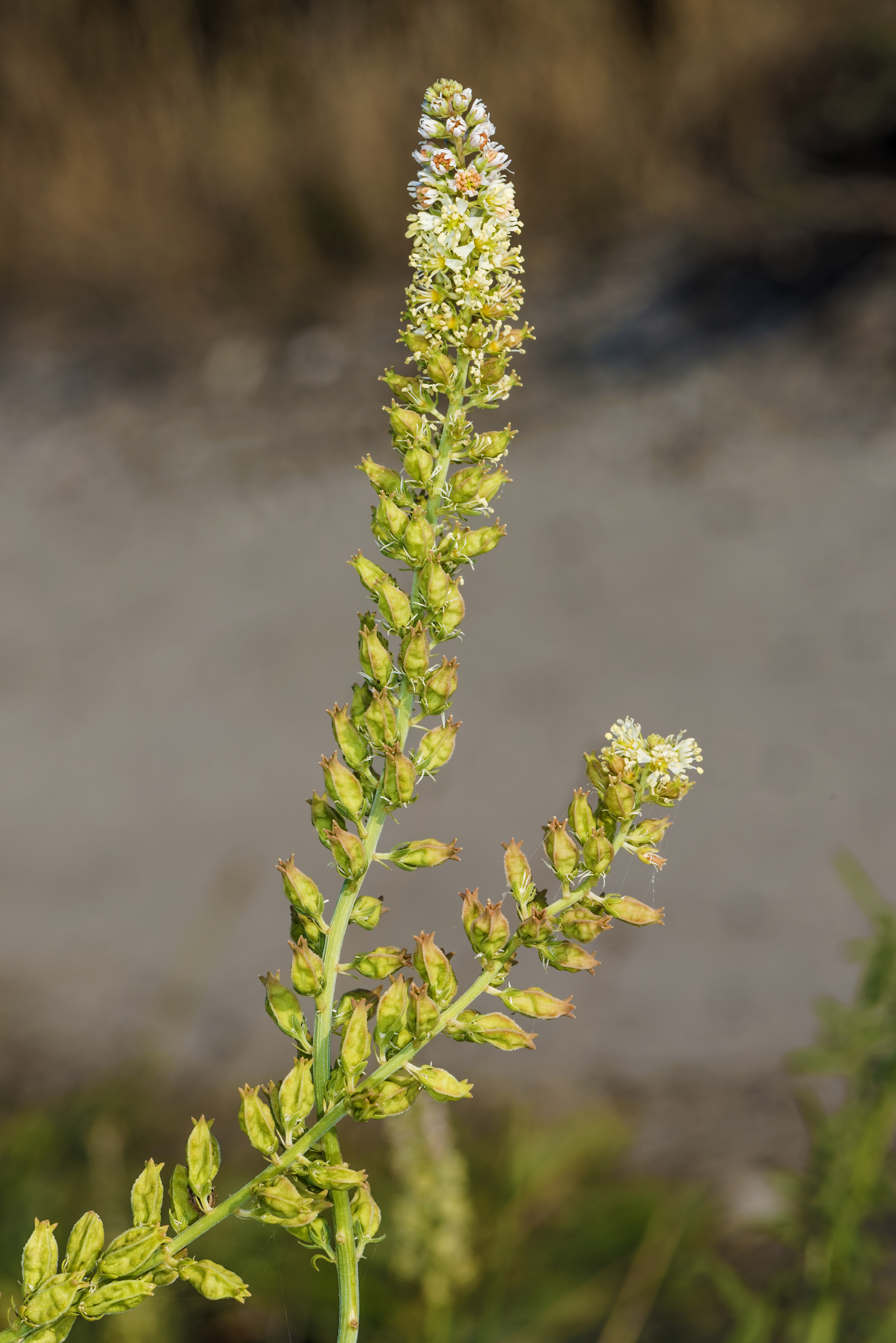
October flowers of Reseda alba in Frontignan, France

Reseda alba is a species of flowering plant in the reseda family known by the common names white mignonette or white upright mignonette. It is native to Europe, Asia, and North Africa, and it can be found in parts of the Americas and Australia as an introduced species. It is also cultivated as an ornamental plant for its spikelike racemes of fragrant white flowers. This is an annual or perennial herb growing up to a meter tall. The leaves are divided deeply into many narrow lobes. The inflorescence, which may take up most of the upper stem, is densely packed with many white flowers. Each flower has five or six petals, each of which is divided into three long, narrow lobes, making the raceme appear frilly. The fruit is a nearly rectangular four-angled capsule up to 1.4 centimeters in length.
