= Caylusea abyssinica =

Scientific classification
- Kingdom: Plantae
- Clade: Tracheophytes
- Clade: Angiosperms
- Clade: Eudicots
- Clade: Rosids
- Order: Brassicales
- Family: Resedaceae
- Genus: Caylusea
- Species: C. abyssinica

Binomial name
- Caylusea abyssinica (Fresen.) Fisch. & C.A.Mey.

Species of flowering plant

Caylusea abyssinica is a plant species found in East Africa.

The edible aerial parts are used as a vegetable in Tanzania and Ethiopia.
