= Tirania =

Scientific classification
- Kingdom: Plantae
- Clade: Tracheophytes
- Clade: Angiosperms
- Clade: Eudicots
- Clade: Rosids
- Order: Brassicales
- Family: Resedaceae
- Genus: Tirania; Pierre (1887)
- Species: T. purpurea

Binomial name
- Tirania purpurea Pierre (1887)

Genus of plants

Tirania purpurea, the sole species in genus Tirania, is a species of climbing plant endemic to Vietnam. This genus is related to Forchhammeria and Stixis, but the placement of these three is uncertain. They were placed in Capparaceae until DNA studies showed them to be more closely related to Resedaceae that to Capparaceae. They are sometimes placed in their own family Stixaceae, but since it is not yet clear whether they are from a clade, they are better left in Brassicales unplaced at family rank.
