= Buchholzia (plant) =

Scientific classification
- Kingdom: Plantae
- Clade: Tracheophytes
- Clade: Angiosperms
- Clade: Eudicots
- Clade: Rosids
- Order: Brassicales
- Family: Capparaceae
- Genus: Buchholzia; Engl.

Genus of flowering plants

Buchholzia is a genus of flowering plants belonging to the family Capparaceae.

The genus was first described by Adolf Engler.

The species of this genus are found in Western and Western Central Tropical Africa.

Species:

- Buchholzia coriacea Engl.
- Buchholzia tholloniana Hua
