= Beautempsia =

Scientific classification
- Kingdom: Plantae
- Clade: Tracheophytes
- Clade: Angiosperms
- Clade: Eudicots
- Clade: Rosids
- Order: Brassicales
- Family: Capparaceae
- Genus: Beautempsia (Benth. & Hook.f.) Gaudich. (1866)
- Species: B. avicenniifolia

Binomial name
- Beautempsia avicenniifolia (Kunth) Gaudich. (1866)

Synonyms
- Capparis avicenniifolia Kunth (1821); Capparis ovalifolia Ruiz & Pav. ex DC. (1824), not validly publ.; Colicodendron avicenniifolium (Kunth) Seem. (1852)

Genus of flowering plants

Beautempsia avicenniifolia is a species of flowering plant belonging to the family Capparaceae. It is a shrub or tree native to Ecuador and Peru. It is the sole species in genus Beautempsia.
