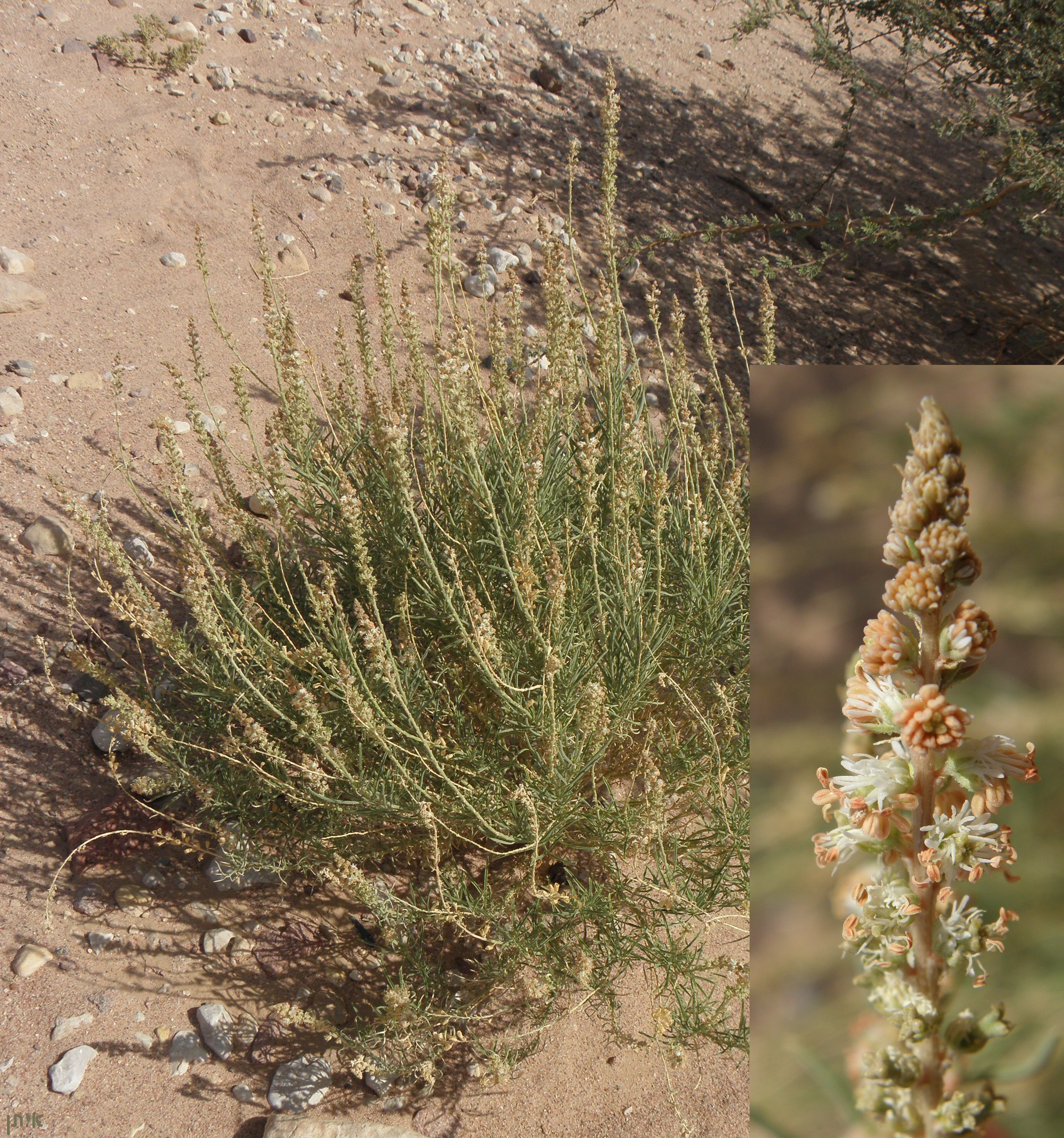
- Caylusea hexagyna

Scientific classification
- Kingdom: Plantae
- Clade: Tracheophytes
- Clade: Angiosperms
- Clade: Eudicots
- Clade: Rosids
- Order: Brassicales
- Family: Resedaceae
- Genus: Caylusea; A. St.-Hil.

Species
- See text

= Caylusea =

Genus of flowering plants

The plant genus Caylusea is a small group of plants found in parts of Africa and India. Caylusea abyssinica is eaten as a vegetable.

== Selected species ==
- Caylusea abyssinica Fisch. & C.A.Mey.
- Caylusea canescens Webb
- Caylusea canescens A.St.-Hil. (IK)
- Caylusea hexagyna (Forssk.) M.L.Green
- Caylusea jaberi Abedin
- Caylusea latifolia P.Taylor
- Caylusea moquiniana Webb
