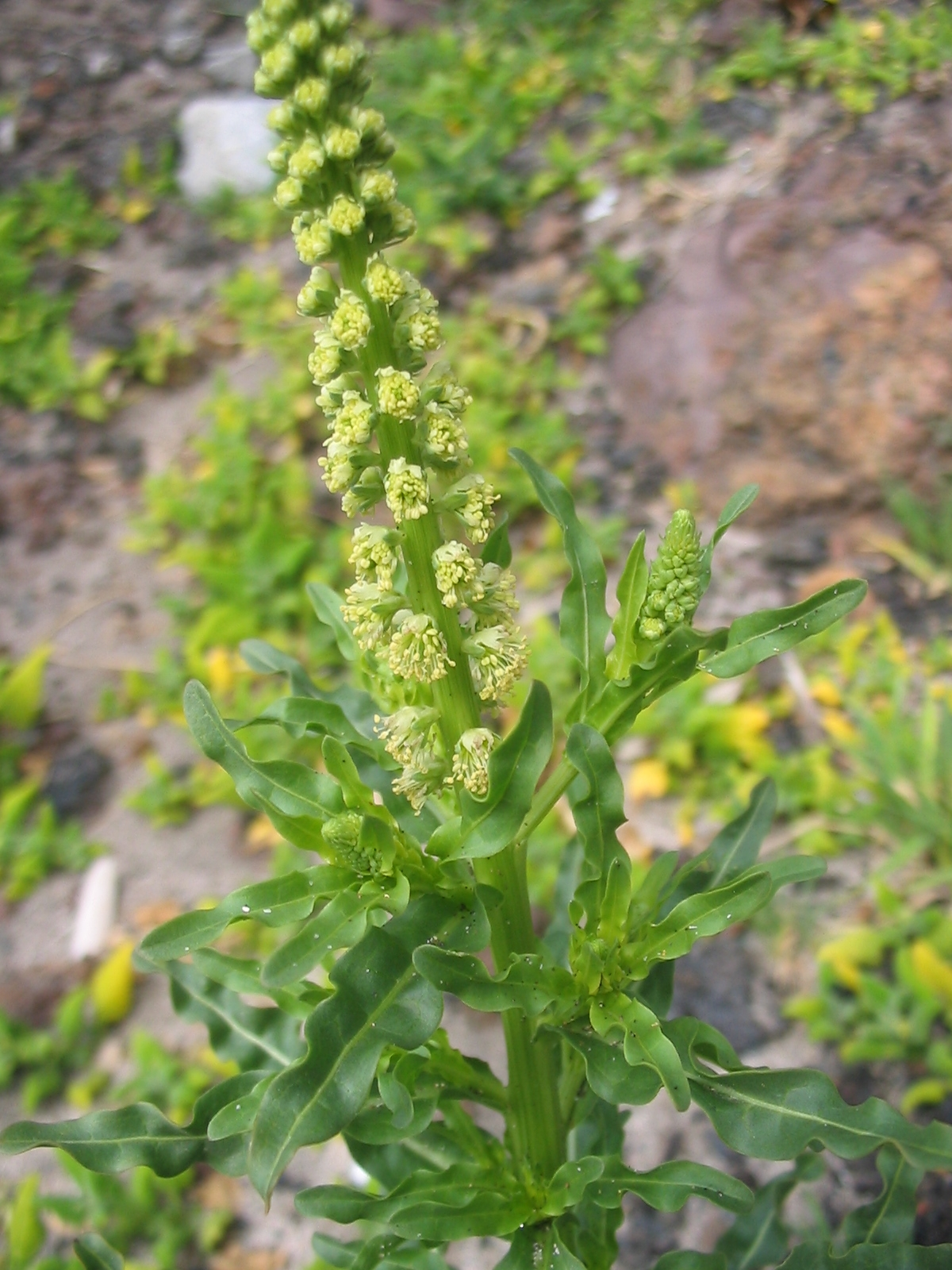

Scientific classification
- Kingdom: Plantae
- Clade: Tracheophytes
- Clade: Angiosperms
- Clade: Eudicots
- Clade: Rosids
- Order: Brassicales
- Family: Resedaceae
- Genus: Reseda
- Species: R. luteola

Binomial name
- Reseda luteola L.

= Reseda luteola =

Species of flowering plant

Reseda luteola is a flowering plant species in the family Resedaceae. Common names include dyer's rocket, dyer's weed, weld, woold, and yellow weed.

A native of Europe and Western Asia, the plant can also be found in North America as an introduced species and common weed. While other resedas were used for the purpose, this species was the most widely used source of the natural dye known as weld. The plant is rich in luteolin, a flavonoid which produces a bright yellow dye. The yellow could be mixed with the blue from woad (Isatis tinctoria) to produce greens such as Lincoln green.

== History and usage ==
Weld can be used to dye linen, wool, and silk all shades of yellow, producing a bright and beautiful colour with proper management. It was in use by the first millennium BC, and perhaps earlier than either woad or madder. It was used in the Bayeux Tapestry.

Until the discovery of quercitron it was the most used yellow dye but by the end of the 19th century was being replaced by the synthetic aniline dyes which were cheaper to produce. Historically, France exported large quantities of weld.

The plant prefers waste places. Small, thin-stemmed plants with yellow or greenish flowers and plenty of leaves are a better source of dye than large, thick-stemmed ones, and those that grow on dry, sandy soils are better than those grown on rich, moist soils. To produce the greatest amount of dye, the plant should be cut before the fruits have developed much, otherwise the pigment diminishes.

Reseda is a primary dye for the wool tapestries at the Ramses Wissa Wassef Art Centre in Giza, Egypt. Each February, the reseda is harvested for the annual wool dyeing event among all the artists at the centre.

== Natural chemical constituents ==
A dominating natural plant chemical in Reseda luteola is glucobarbarin, named for its occurrence in a distantly related plant, Barbarea vulgaris. Glucobarbarin is a glucosinolate, the characteristic chemicals in the order Brassicales (Cabbages, mustards etc.) that Reseda luteola belongs to. When the plant is crushed, glucobarbarin is converted by an enzyme into barbarin (5-phenyl-1,3-oxazolidine-2-thione). This compound is sometimes (inappropriately) named resedinine, a name coined by Soviet researchers that rediscovered the compound in Reseda luteola (Lutfullin et al., 1976) apparently without being aware of the previous discovery and naming in the west around two decades earlier.

Yet another enzyme slowly converts barbarin into resedine (5-phenyl-1,3-oxazolidin-2-one), this chemical discovered and named by the same Soviet researchers (Lutfullin et al., 1976), giving it a name that is still valid. Barbarin and resedine can also be called alkaloids, but they are not typical alkaloids, in that they do not exist in the intact plant but are only formed after crushing the plant physically. Glucobarbarin, like other glucosinolates, is known to attract cabbage butterflies for egg-laying. Any ecological, medical or health effects of barbarin and resedine are poorly understood.

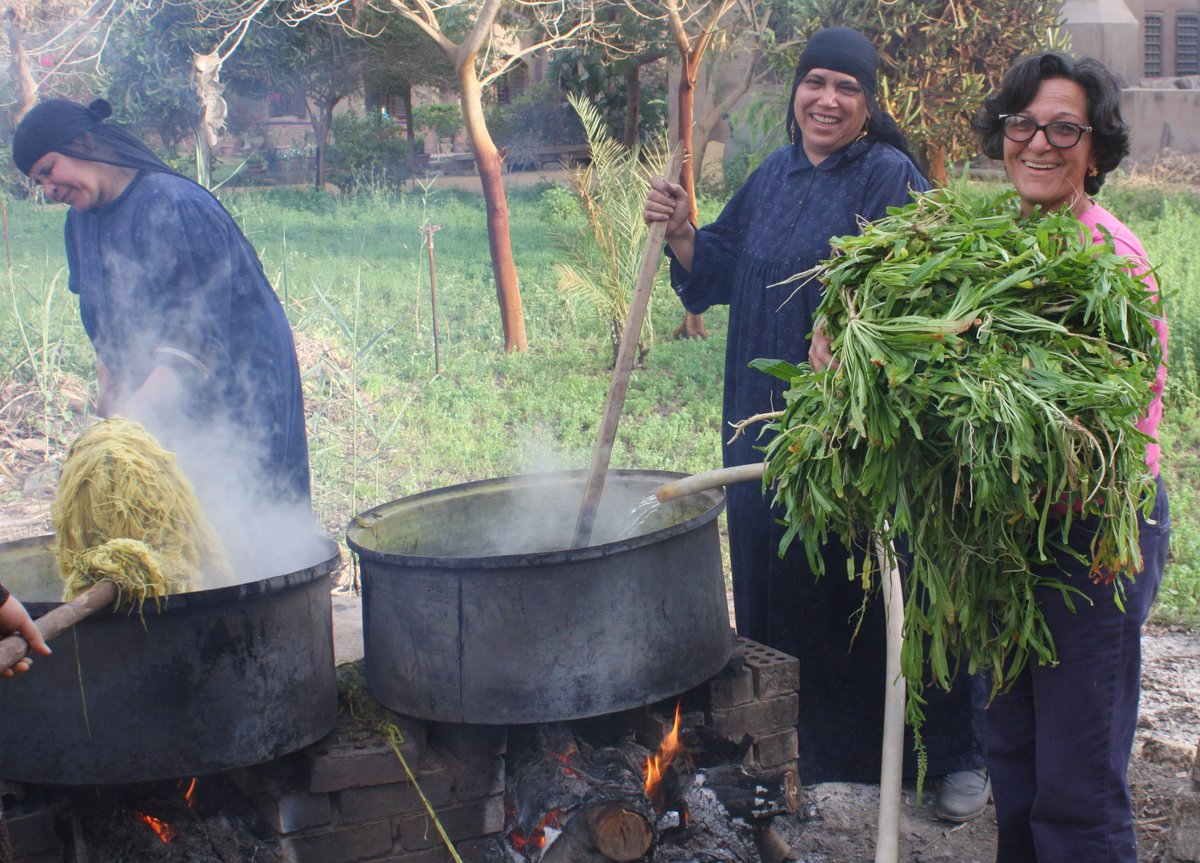
Ramses Wissa Wassef Art Centre annual wool dyeing with reseda

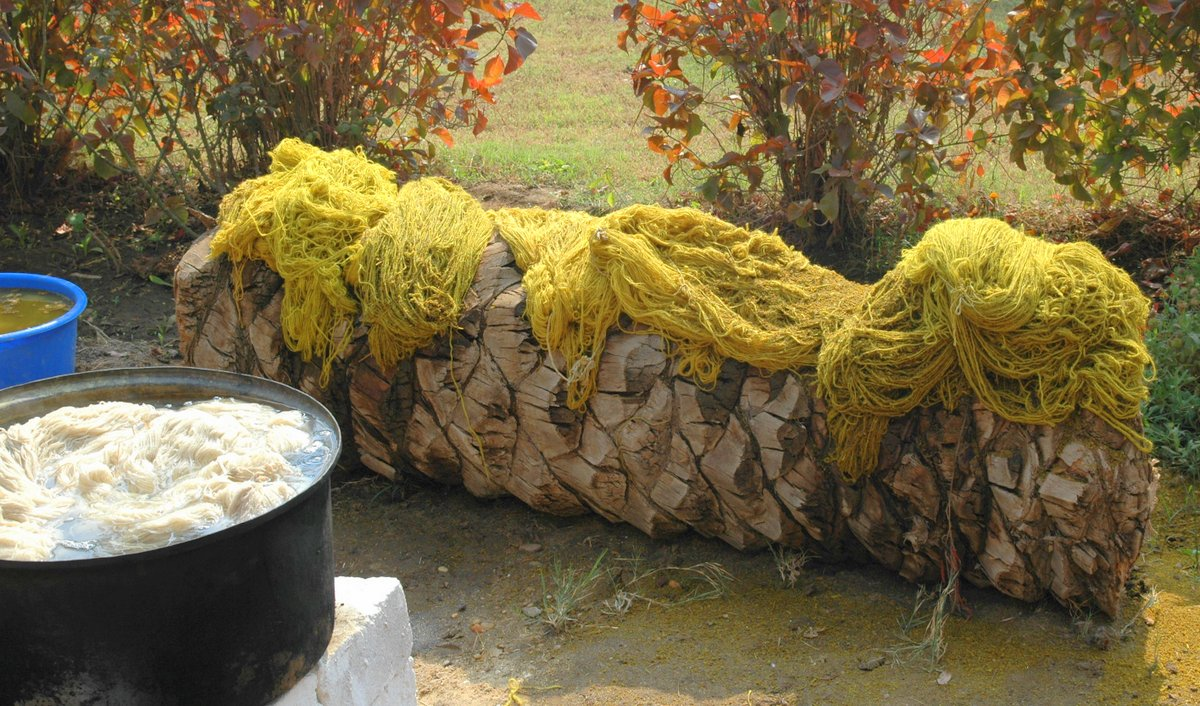
Wool dyed with reseda at Wissa Wassef Art Centre, Giza, Egypt, 2016
