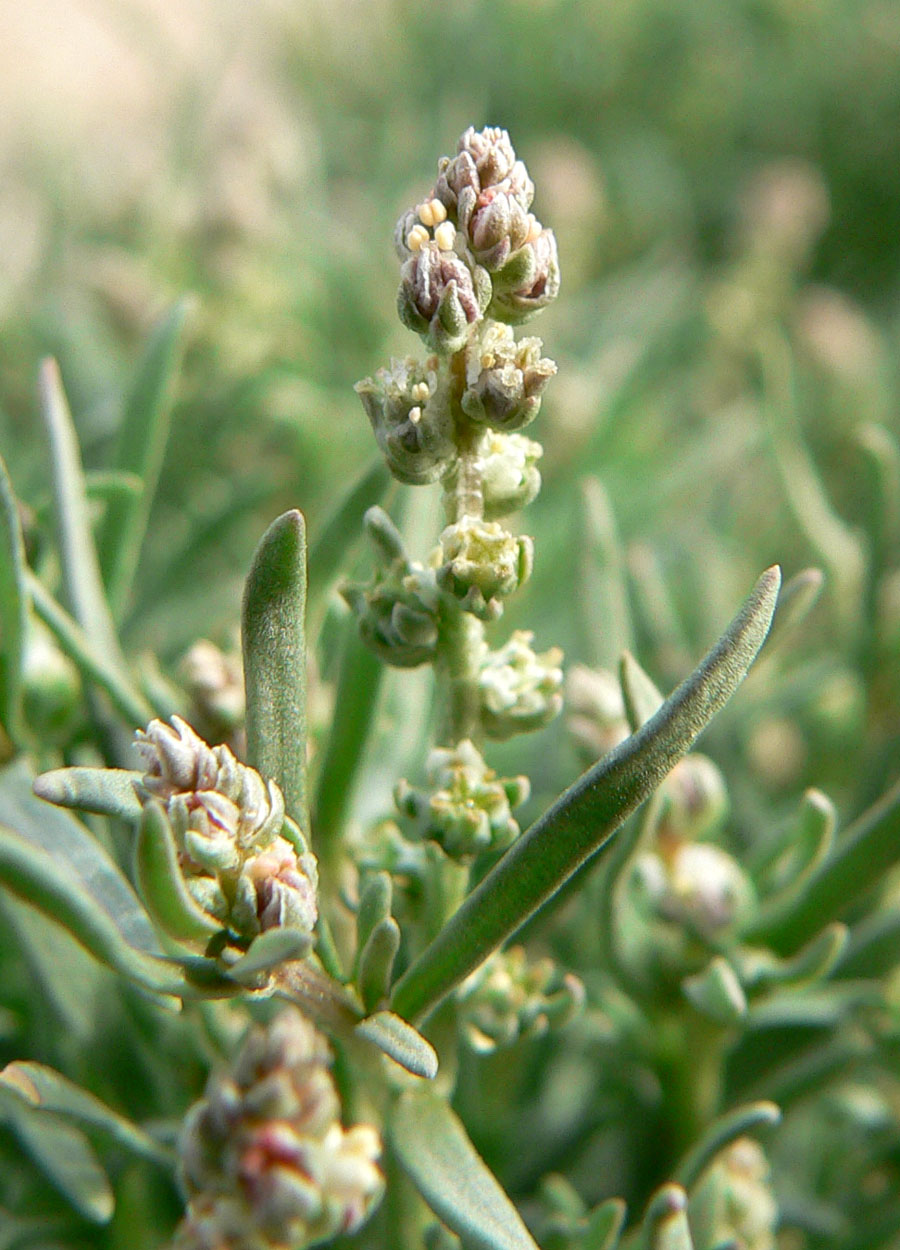
- Oligomeris linifolia

Scientific classification
- Kingdom: Plantae
- Clade: Tracheophytes
- Clade: Angiosperms
- Clade: Eudicots
- Clade: Rosids
- Order: Brassicales
- Family: Resedaceae
- Genus: Oligomeris; Cambess.

= Oligomeris =

Genus of plants

Oligomeris is a genus of flowering plants belonging to the family Resedaceae.

Its native range includes the southwestern United States, Mexico, Southern and Northern Africa, Somalia, Crete, southwestern Asia, Pakistan and China.

== Species ==
Species:

- Oligomeris dipetala (Aiton) Turcz.
- Oligomeris dregeana (C.Presl) Müll.Arg.
- Oligomeris linifolia (Vahl ex Hornem.) J.F.Macbr.
