= Reseda green =

Shade of green (colour)

Colour coordinates
- Hex triplet: #6C7C59
- sRGB^{B} (r, g, b): (108, 124, 89)
- HSV (h, s, v): (87°, 28%, 49%)
- CIELCh_{uv} (L, C, h): (50, 25, 108°)
- ISCC–NBS descriptor: Moderate olive green
- B: Normalized to [0–255] (byte)

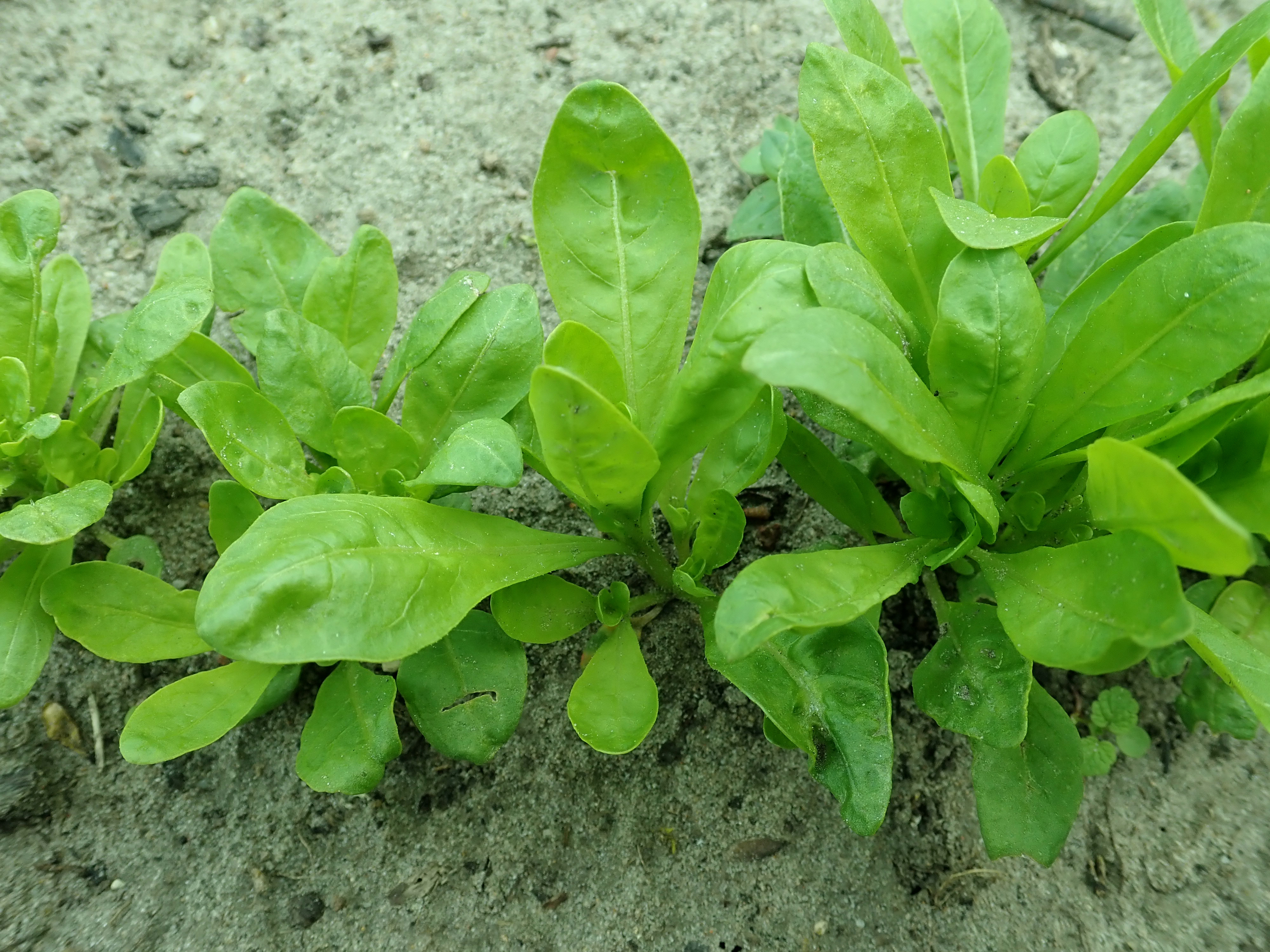
Reseda odorata

Reseda green is a shade of greyish green in the classic range of colours of the German RAL colour standard, where it is colour 6011. The name derives from the colour of the leaves of Reseda odorata, commonly known as mignonette.

Prior to World War I, the French Army experimented with reseda green uniforms to replace the existing indigo uniform colour, but they were rejected.
