= Randonia =

Scientific classification
- Kingdom: Plantae
- Clade: Tracheophytes
- Clade: Angiosperms
- Clade: Eudicots
- Clade: Rosids
- Order: Brassicales
- Family: Resedaceae
- Genus: Randonia; Coss.
- Species: R. africana

Binomial name
- Randonia africana Ernest Saint-Charles Cosson

Species of flowering plant

Randonia is a monotypic genus of flowering plants belonging to the family Resedaceae. The only species is Randonia africana.

Its native range is Sahara desert in northern Africa. It is found in Algeria, Egypt, Libya, Mauritania, Morocco and Tunisia.

The genus name of Randonia is in honour of Jacques Louis Randon (1795–1871), a French military and political leader, also Marshal of France and governor of Algeria. The Latin specific epithet of africana means coming from Africa. The genus and the species were first described and published in Bull. Soc. Bot. France Vol.6 on pages 391–392 in 1859.
