= Stixaceae =

Stixaceae is a family in the plant order Brassicales. It is no longer recognised by most taxonomists. The three genera formerly included in Stixaceae — Forchhammeria, Stixis and Tirania — have sometimes been placed instead in the Capparaceae, but it is now clear that they do not belong there. It is unknown where they do belong though, so currently they are unplaced at family rank. In the APG IV system, the genera comprising Stixaceae are included in the family Resedaceae.
