= Ochradiscus =

Scientific classification
- Kingdom: Plantae
- Clade: Tracheophytes
- Clade: Angiosperms
- Clade: Eudicots
- Clade: Rosids
- Order: Brassicales
- Family: Resedaceae
- Genus: Ochradiscus; S.Blanco & C.E.Wetzel (2016)

Species
- Ochradiscus aucheri (Boiss.) S.Blanco & C.E.Wetzel; Ochradiscus ochradeni (Boiss.) S.Blanco & C.E.Wetzel

Synonyms
- Homalodiscus Bunge ex Boiss. (1867), nom. illeg.

Genus of plants

Ochradiscus is a genus of flowering plants in the family Resedaceae. It includes two species native to Asia, ranging from Turkmenistan to Iran, Pakistan, Oman, and the United Arab Emirates. They are shrubs or subshrubs which grow in deserts and dry shrublands.

- Ochradiscus aucheri (Boiss.) S.Blanco & C.E.Wetzel – Iran, Pakistan, Oman, and UAE
- Ochradiscus ochradeni (Boiss.) S.Blanco & C.E.Wetzel – Iran and Turkmenistan
