= Hypselandra =

Scientific classification
- Kingdom: Plantae
- Clade: Tracheophytes
- Clade: Angiosperms
- Clade: Eudicots
- Clade: Rosids
- Order: Brassicales
- Family: Capparaceae
- Genus: Hypselandra; Pax & K.Hoffm.
- Species: H. variabilis

Binomial name
- Hypselandra variabilis (Collett & Hemsl.) Pax & K.Hoffm. (1936)

Synonyms
- Bosciopsis B.S.Sun (1964), nom. illeg.; Meeboldia Pax & K.Hoffm. (1936), nom. illeg.; Boscia prunoides Gage (1910); Boscia variabilis Collett & Hemsl. (1890); Bosciopsis variabilis (Kurz) B.S.Sun (1964); Niebuhria variabilis Kurz (1874)

Genus of plants

Hypselandra variabilis is a species of flowering plant in the family Capparaceae. It is endemic to Myanmar. It is the sole species in genus Hypselandra.
