= Neocalyptrocalyx =

Scientific classification
- Kingdom: Plantae
- Clade: Tracheophytes
- Clade: Angiosperms
- Clade: Eudicots
- Clade: Rosids
- Order: Brassicales
- Family: Capparaceae
- Genus: Neocalyptrocalyx; Hutch.

Genus of plants

Neocalyptrocalyx is a genus of flowering plants belonging to the family Capparaceae.

Its native range is Northern South America to Northern and Eastern Brazil.

Species:

- Neocalyptrocalyx aequatoriensis Cornejo & Luber
- Neocalyptrocalyx atlanticus Luber & Cornejo
- Neocalyptrocalyx eichleriana (Urb.) Iltis & Cornejo
- Neocalyptrocalyx grandipetala (Maguire & Steyerm.) Cornejo & Iltis
- Neocalyptrocalyx leprieurii (Briq.) Iltis
- Neocalyptrocalyx maroniensis (Benoist) Cornejo & Iltis
- Neocalyptrocalyx morii Cornejo & Iltis
- Neocalyptrocalyx muco (Iltis, Cumaná, R.Delgado & Aymard) Cornejo & Iltis
- Neocalyptrocalyx nectarius (Vell.) Hutch.
- Neocalyptrocalyx polycataphyllus Luber & Cornejo
