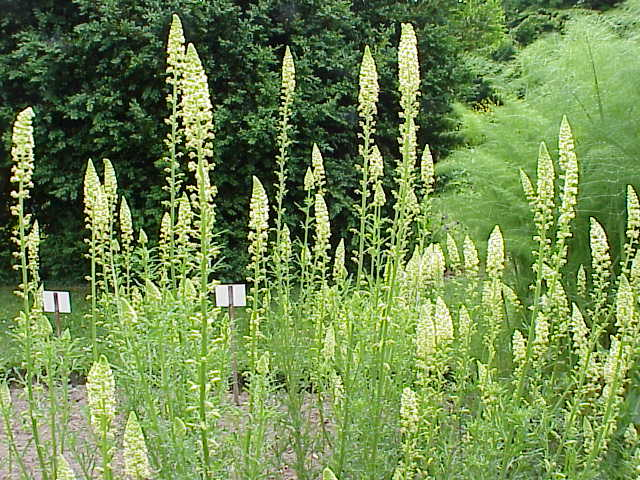
- Reseda lutea (wild mignonette)

Scientific classification
- Kingdom: Plantae
- Clade: Tracheophytes
- Clade: Angiosperms
- Clade: Eudicots
- Clade: Rosids
- Order: Brassicales
- Family: Resedaceae
- Genus: Reseda; L.

Species
- See text

= Reseda (plant) =

Genus of flowering plants

Reseda /rɪˈsiːdə/, also known as the mignonette /ˌmɪnjəˈnɛt/, is a genus of fragrant herbaceous plants native to Europe, southwest Asia and North Africa, from the Canary Islands and Iberia east to northwest India.

== Description ==
Reseda includes herbaceous annual, biennial and perennial species 40–130 cm (20–50 in) tall. The leaves form a basal rosette at ground level, and then spirally arranged up the stem; they can be entire, toothed or pinnate, and range from 1–15 cm (0.4–5.9 in) long. The flowers are produced in a slender spike, each flower small (4–6 mm (0.16–0.24 in) diameter), white, yellow, orange, or green, with four to six petals. The fruit is a small dry capsule containing several seeds.

== Cultivation and uses ==
Propagation is by seed, which is surface-sown directly into the garden or grass verge. The plant does not take well to transplanting and should not be moved after sowing.

Mignonette flowers are extremely fragrant. It is grown for the sweet ambrosial scent of its flowers. It is used in flower arrangements, perfumes and potpourri. A Victorian favourite, it was commonly grown in pots and in window-boxes to scent the city air. It was used as a sedative and a treatment for bruises in Roman times. The volatile oil is used in perfumery. Yellow dye was obtained from the roots of R. luteola by the first millennium BC, and perhaps earlier than either woad or madder. Use of this dye came to an end at the beginning of the twentieth century, when cheaper synthetic yellow dyes came into use.

Charles Darwin used R. odorata in his studies of self-fertilised plants, which he documented in The Effects of Cross and Self-Fertilisation in the Vegetable Kingdom.

== Species ==
As of March 2014 The Plant List recognises 41 accepted species (including infraspecific names):

- Reseda alba L. White Mignonette
  - subsp. myriosperma (Murb.) Maire
- Reseda arabica Boiss.
- Reseda aucheri Boiss.
- Reseda barrelieri Bertol. ex Müll.Arg.
- Reseda bucharica Litv.
- Reseda complicata Bory Glaucous Mignonette
- Reseda decursiva Forssk.
- Reseda ellenbeckii Perkins
- Reseda glauca L.
- Reseda globulosa Fisch. & C.A.Mey.
- Reseda gredensis (Cutanda & Willk.) Müll.Arg.
- Reseda inodora Rchb.
- Reseda jacquinii Rchb.
  - subsp. litigiosa (Sennen & Pau) Abdallah & de Wit
- Reseda lanceolata Lag.
- Reseda lutea L. Wild Mignonette
  - subsp. neglecta (Müll.Arg.) Abdallah & de Wit
- Reseda luteola L. Weld
  - subsp. biaui (Pit.) Maire
- Reseda media Lag.
- Reseda minoica Martín-Bravo & Jim.Mejías
- Reseda muricata C.Presl
- Reseda odorata L. Common Mignonette
- Reseda orientalis (Müll.Arg.) Boiss.
- Reseda paui Valdés Berm. & Kaercher
  - subsp. almijarensis Valdés Berm. & Kaercher
- Reseda phyteuma L. Corn Mignonette
  - subsp. collina (Müll.Arg.) Batt.
- Reseda pruinosa Delile
- Reseda scoparia Brouss. ex Willd. Canaries Mignonette
- Reseda stenostachya Boiss.
- Reseda stricta Pers.
- Reseda suffruticosa Loefl.
  - subsp. barrelieri (Bertol. ex Muller) Fern. Casas, Molero & J. Pujadas
- Reseda tymphaea Hausskn.
  - subsp. anatolica (Boiss.) Abdallah & de Wit
- Reseda undata L.
  - subsp. gayana (Boiss.) Valdés Berm.
  - subsp. leucantha (Hegelm. ex Lange) Aránega ex Valdés Berm.
- Reseda urnigera Webb
- Reseda villosa Coss.
- Reseda virgata Boiss. & Reut.
- Reseda viridis Balf.f.

== See also ==
- Reseda green, a color named after the plant's leaves (not a dye)
