= Poilanedora =

Scientific classification
- Kingdom: Plantae
- Clade: Tracheophytes
- Clade: Angiosperms
- Clade: Eudicots
- Clade: Rosids
- Order: Brassicales
- Family: Capparaceae
- Genus: Poilanedora; Gagnep.
- Species: P. unijuga

Binomial name
- Poilanedora unijuga Gagnep.

Genus of plants

Poilanedora is a monotypic genus of flowering plants belonging to the family Capparaceae. The only species is Poilanedora unijuga.

It is native to Vietnam.

The genus name of Poilanedora is in honour of Eugène Poilane (1888–1964), a French plant collector at the botanical institute in present-day Ho Chi Minh City, Vietnam. He also worked in the forest service. The Latin specific epithet of unijuga is a portmanteaux word made up of 'uni-' from unis meaning one and also jugo or jugalis (pertaining to a yoke; matrimonial). Both the genus and the species were first described and published in Bull. Soc. Bot. France Vol.95 on page 27 in 1948.
