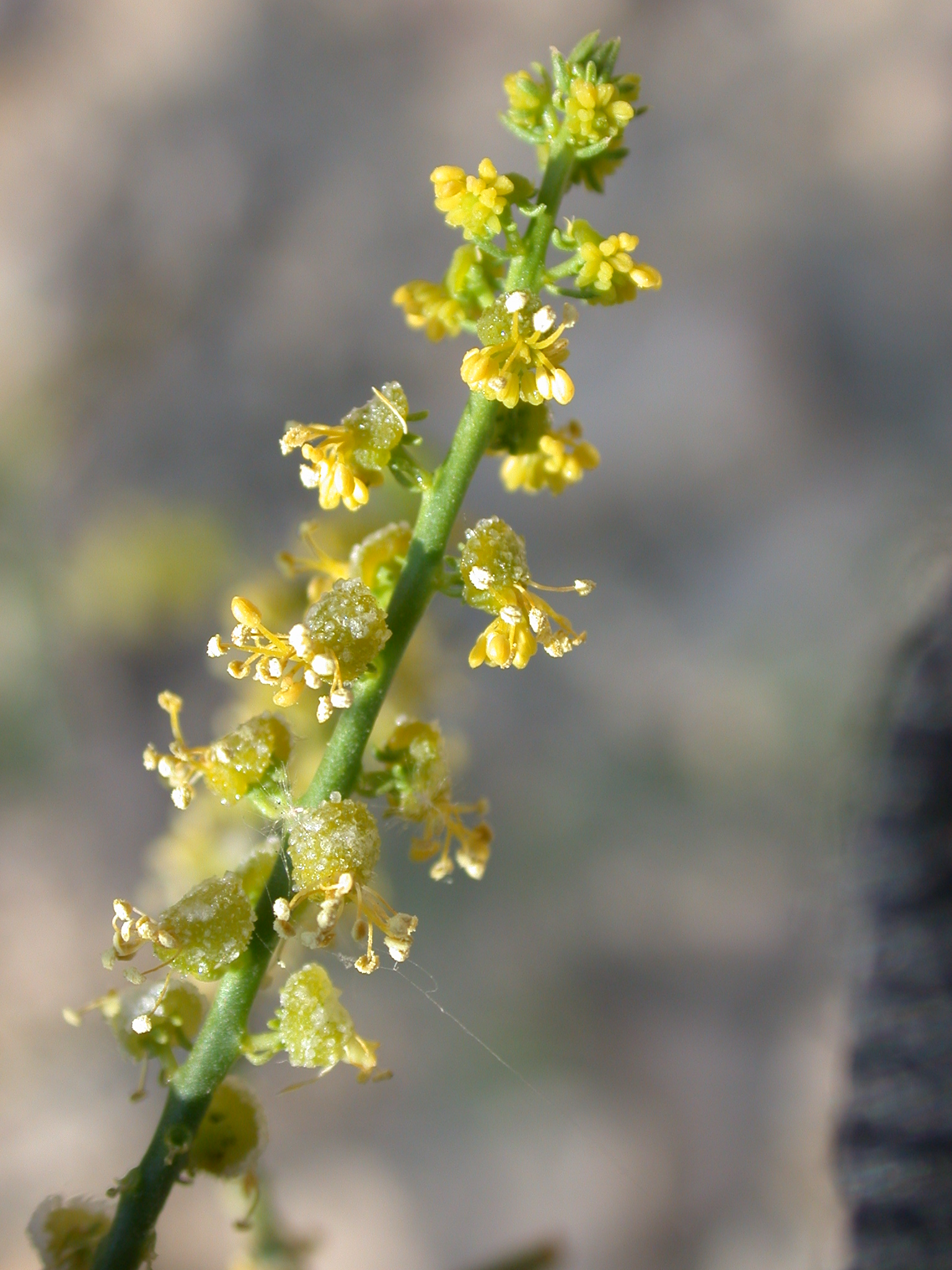
- Ochradenus baccatus

Scientific classification
- Kingdom: Plantae
- Clade: Tracheophytes
- Clade: Angiosperms
- Clade: Eudicots
- Clade: Rosids
- Order: Brassicales
- Family: Resedaceae
- Genus: Ochradenus; Delile

= Ochradenus =

Genus of flowering plants

Ochradenus is a genus of flowering plants in family Resedaceae. It contains the eight species which range from northeastern Africa through the Arabian Peninsula to Iran and India.

== Species ==
Eight species are accepted.

- Ochradenus arabicus Chaudhary, Hillc. & A.G.Mill.
- Ochradenus baccatus Delile
- Ochradenus gifrii Thulin
- Ochradenus harsusiticus A.G.Mill.
- Ochradenus lakhpatensis R.M.Patel & Prajapati
- Ochradenus socotranus A.G.Mill.
- Ochradenus somalensis Baker f.
- Ochradenus spartioides (O.Schwartz) Abdallah

A molecular study published in 2007 found that Ochradenus arose from within the ranks of Reseda. Therefore, in future this genus may be abandoned, and its species transferred into Reseda.
