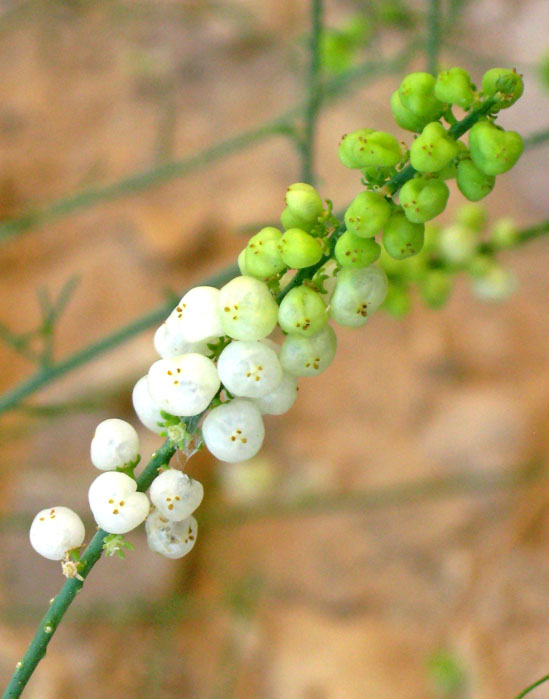
- Fruits of Ochradenus baccatus
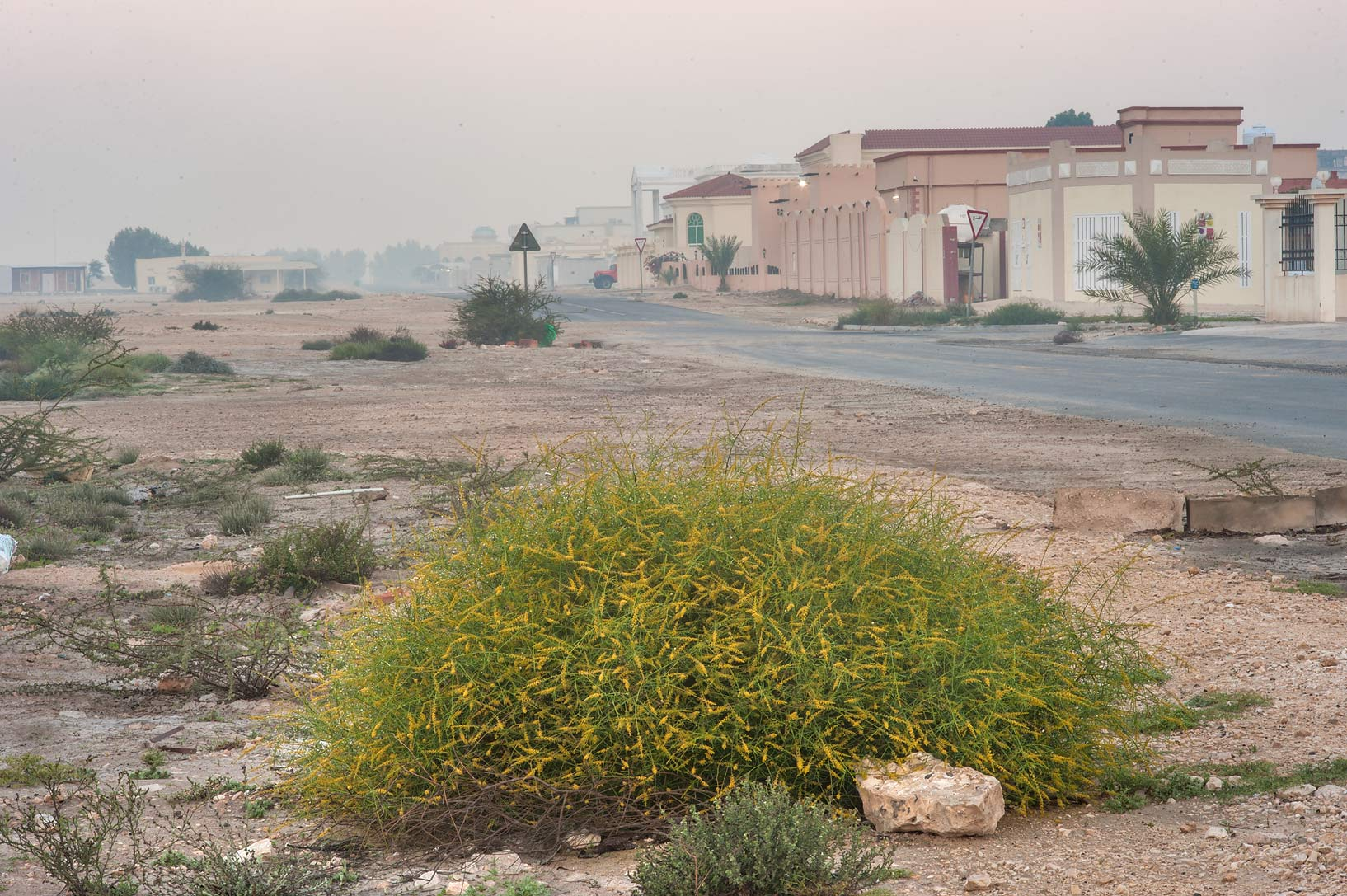
- Ochradenus baccatus growing in central Qatar

Scientific classification
- Kingdom: Plantae
- Clade: Tracheophytes
- Clade: Angiosperms
- Clade: Eudicots
- Clade: Rosids
- Order: Brassicales
- Family: Resedaceae
- Genus: Ochradenus
- Species: O. baccatus

Binomial name
- Ochradenus baccatus Delile

= Ochradenus baccatus =

Species of plant

Ochradenus baccatus is a perennial shrub of the family Resedaceae, native to arid and semi-arid regions of the Middle East, North Africa, and into Iran and Pakistan. It is characterized by its green, leafless branches and distinctive yellow flowers and white berries. It is widespread in disturbed habitats and desert depressions, including roadsides and semi-natural areas.

== Description ==
Ochradenus baccatus is a dioecious or occasionally monoecious shrub, typically 50–200 cm tall, with slender, photosynthetic green stems that lack true leaves. The small yellow flowers are sexually dimorphic. Female flowers produce white, sweet-tasting berries containing black seeds that are exposed upon fruit dehiscence. Flowering occurs primarily from March to April.

== Habitat ==
This species grows in sandy and gravelly soils, commonly found in wadis, depressions, and areas subject to disturbance. It is frequent in ruderal zones such as roadside verges and near urban developments.

== Distribution ==
Ochradenus baccatus is native to North Africa, the Arabian Peninsula, and parts of the Middle East, with occurrences in Qatar, Bahrain, Kuwait, eastern Saudi Arabia, and the UAE. In Qatar, where it is known as qurdi, its presence is well established in central and northern regions.

== Ecological and local significance ==
The plant plays an important role in the desert ecosystem, particularly as a food source for birds, which disperse its seeds. Its berries attract frugivorous birds and insects, while goats are known to graze on its stems. Traditional uses include application of twigs, leaves, and flowers to infected wounds, particularly for their reputed ability to eliminate maggots. The fruit and foliage are also utilized in folk medicine to relieve stomach discomfort.
