= Salvia clusii =

Salvia clusii is the binomial name ambiguously used to describe several different sage plants:

- Salvia pratensis
- Salvia triloba
- Salvia officinalis
