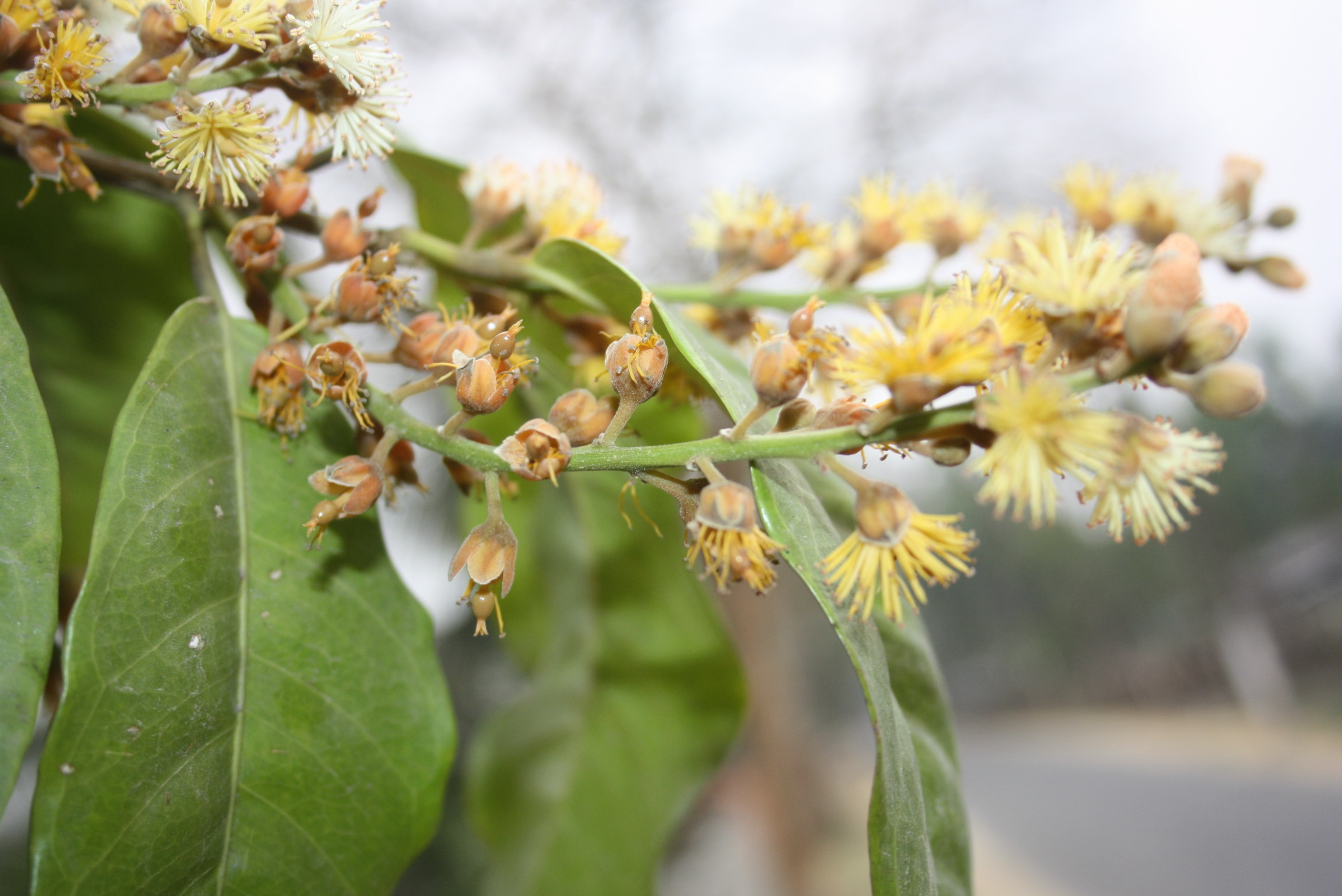
- Stixis suaveolens

Scientific classification
- Kingdom: Plantae
- Clade: Tracheophytes
- Clade: Angiosperms
- Clade: Eudicots
- Clade: Rosids
- Order: Brassicales
- Family: Resedaceae
- Genus: Stixis; Lour., 1790

Synonyms
- Alytostylis Mast.; Covilhamia Korth.; Roydsia Roxb.

= Stixis (plant) =

Genus of plants

Stixis is a South-East Asian genus of plants in the order Brassicales; they are typically lianas. This genus has previously been placed in the Stixaceae (now obsolete) and Capparaceae, but under the APG IV system is now included in the family Resedaceae.

== Species ==
Plants of the World Online (POWO) includes the following accepted species, as of July 2025:

- Stixis hookeri Baill.
- Stixis obtusifolia (Hook.f. & Thomson) Baill.
- Stixis ovata (Korth.) Hallier f.
- Stixis philippinensis (Turcz.) Merr.
- Stixis scandens Lour.
- Stixis scortechinii (King) M.Jacobs
- Stixis suaveolens (Roxb.) Baill.
- Stixis villiflora J.Y.Shen, Landrein, W.G.Wang & X.D.Ma
- Stixis yingjiangensis J.Y.Shen
