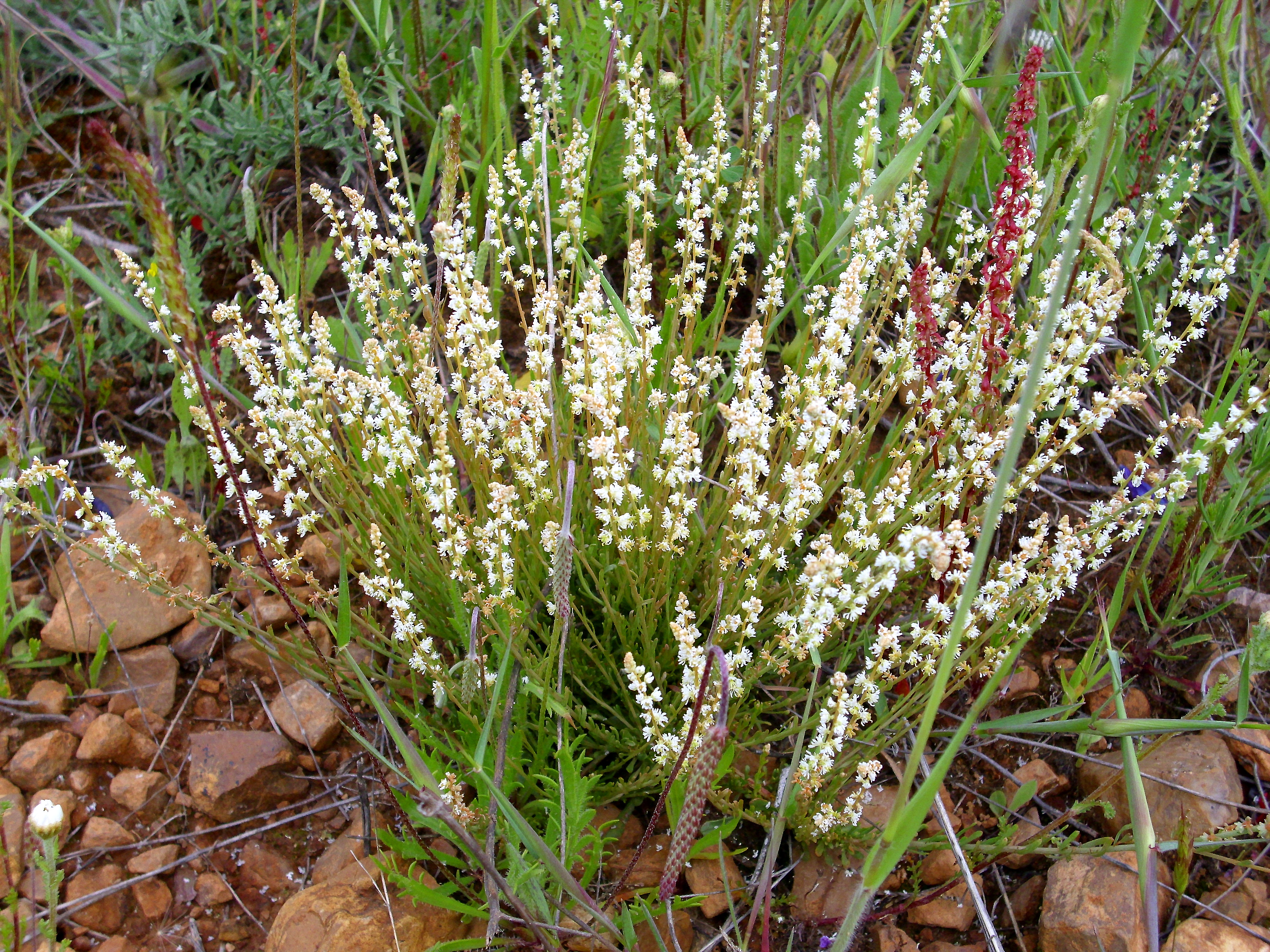
- Sesamoides purpurascens

Scientific classification
- Kingdom: Plantae
- Clade: Tracheophytes
- Clade: Angiosperms
- Clade: Eudicots
- Clade: Rosids
- Order: Brassicales
- Family: Resedaceae
- Genus: Sesamoides; Ortega

= Sesamoides =

Genus of plants

Sesamoides is a genus of flowering plants belonging to the family Resedaceae.

Its native range is Europe and Africa.

== Species ==
Species:

- Sesamoides clusii (Spreng.) Greuter & Burdet
- Sesamoides interrupta (Boreau) G.López
- Sesamoides minor (Lange) Kuntze
- Sesamoides prostrata (Boiss.) G.López
- Sesamoides purpurascens (L.) G.López
- Sesamoides spathulifolia (Revelière ex Boreau) Rothm.
- Sesamoides suffruticosa (Lange) Kuntze
