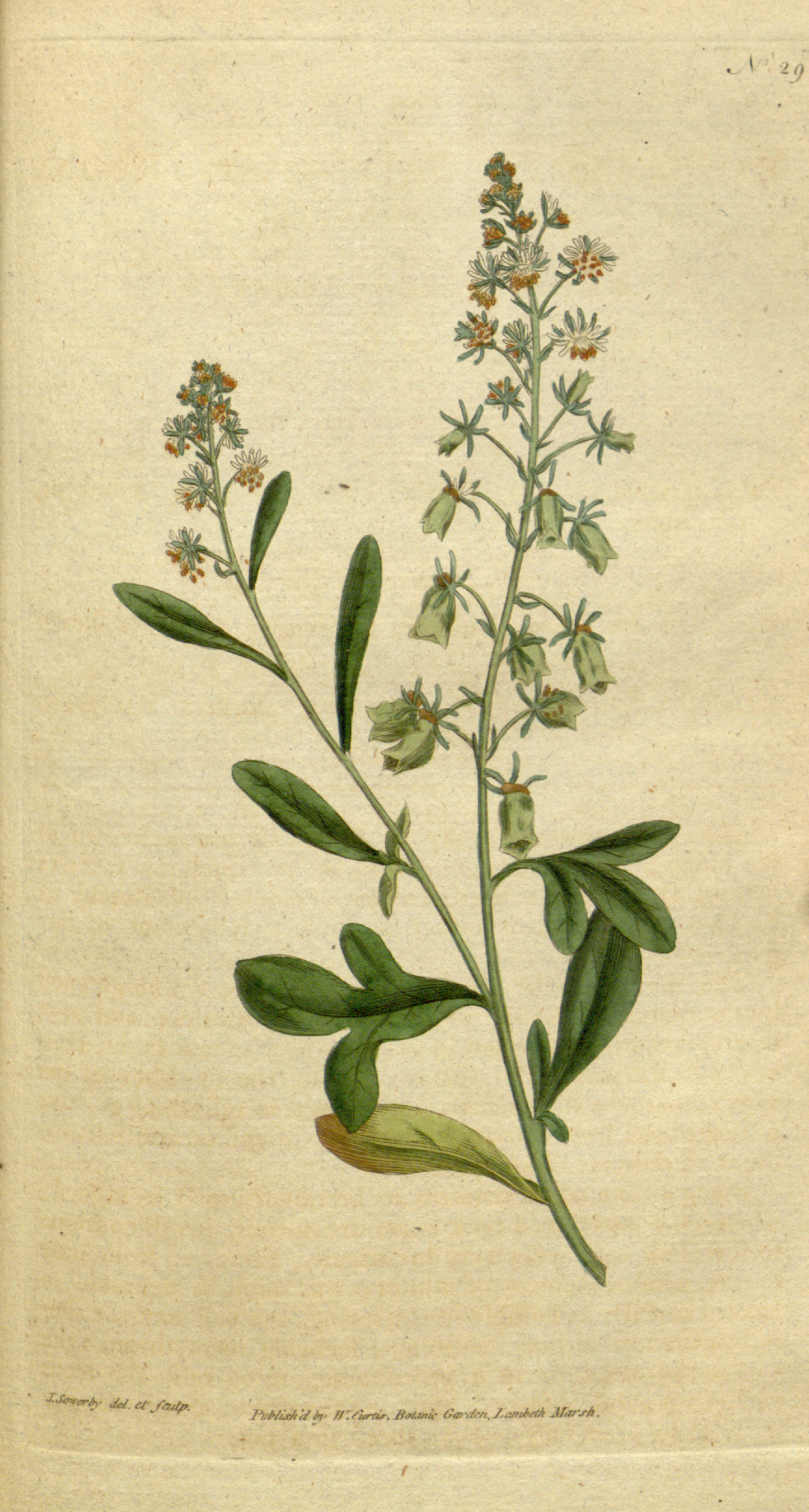

Scientific classification
- Kingdom: Plantae
- Clade: Tracheophytes
- Clade: Angiosperms
- Clade: Eudicots
- Clade: Rosids
- Order: Brassicales
- Family: Resedaceae
- Genus: Reseda
- Species: R. odorata

Binomial name
- Reseda odorata L.

= Reseda odorata =

Species of plant

Reseda odorata is a species of flowering plant in the reseda family known by many common names, including garden mignonette and common mignonette. It is probably native to the Mediterranean Basin, but it can sometimes be found growing in the wild as an introduced species in many parts of the world. These introductions are often garden escapees; the plant has long been kept as an ornamental plant for its fragrant flowers, the essential oil of which has been used in perfumes. This is an annual herb, producing branching erect stems to 80 centimeters in maximum height. The inflorescence is a spike-like raceme of many flowers. The fragrant flower has six white to yellowish or greenish petals, the upper ones each divided into three narrow, finger-like lobes. At the center of the flower are up to about 25 stamens tipped with large dangling orange anthers.

== Common names ==
Mignonette, Egyptian Mignonette., Sweet Reseda, Egyptian Rocket
