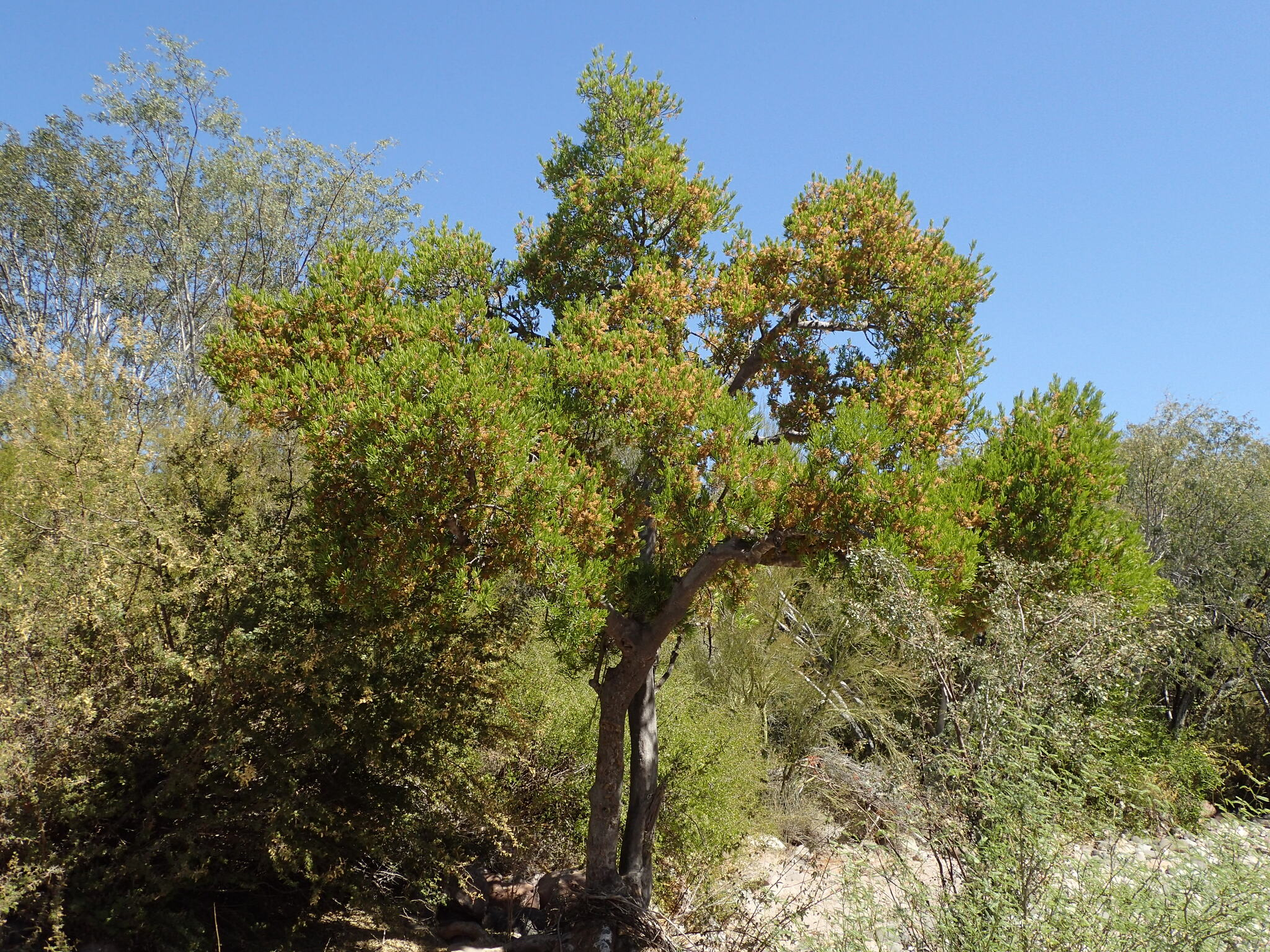
- Forchhammeria watsonii in Mexico

Scientific classification
- Kingdom: Plantae
- Clade: Tracheophytes
- Clade: Angiosperms
- Clade: Eudicots
- Clade: Rosids
- Order: Brassicales
- Family: Resedaceae
- Genus: Forchhammeria; Liebm.

Synonyms
- Murbeckia Urb. & Ekman

= Forchhammeria =

Genus of flowering plants

Forchhammeria is a genus of plants in the order Brassicales. This genus has previously been placed in the Stixaceae (now obsolete) and Capparaceae, but under the APG IV system is now included in the family Resedaceae. Species can be found in Central America and the Caribbean.

== Species ==
As of October 2024, Plants of the World Online accepted these species:

- Forchhammeria brevipes Urb.
- Forchhammeria emarginata Alain
- Forchhammeria haitiensis (Urb. & Ekman) Alain
- Forchhammeria hintonii Paul G.Wilson
- Forchhammeria iltisii J.F.Morales
- Forchhammeria laxiflora Lundell
- Forchhammeria longifolia Standl.
- Forchhammeria macrocarpa Standl.
- Forchhammeria matudae Lundell
- Forchhammeria pallida Liebm.
- Forchhammeria polyandra (Griseb.) Alain
- Forchhammeria sessilifolia Standl.
- Forchhammeria sphaerocarpa Krug & Urb.
- Forchhammeria tamaulipana B.F.Hansen, Iltis & Carlquist
- Forchhammeria trifoliata Radlk. ex Millsp.
- Forchhammeria watsonii Rose
