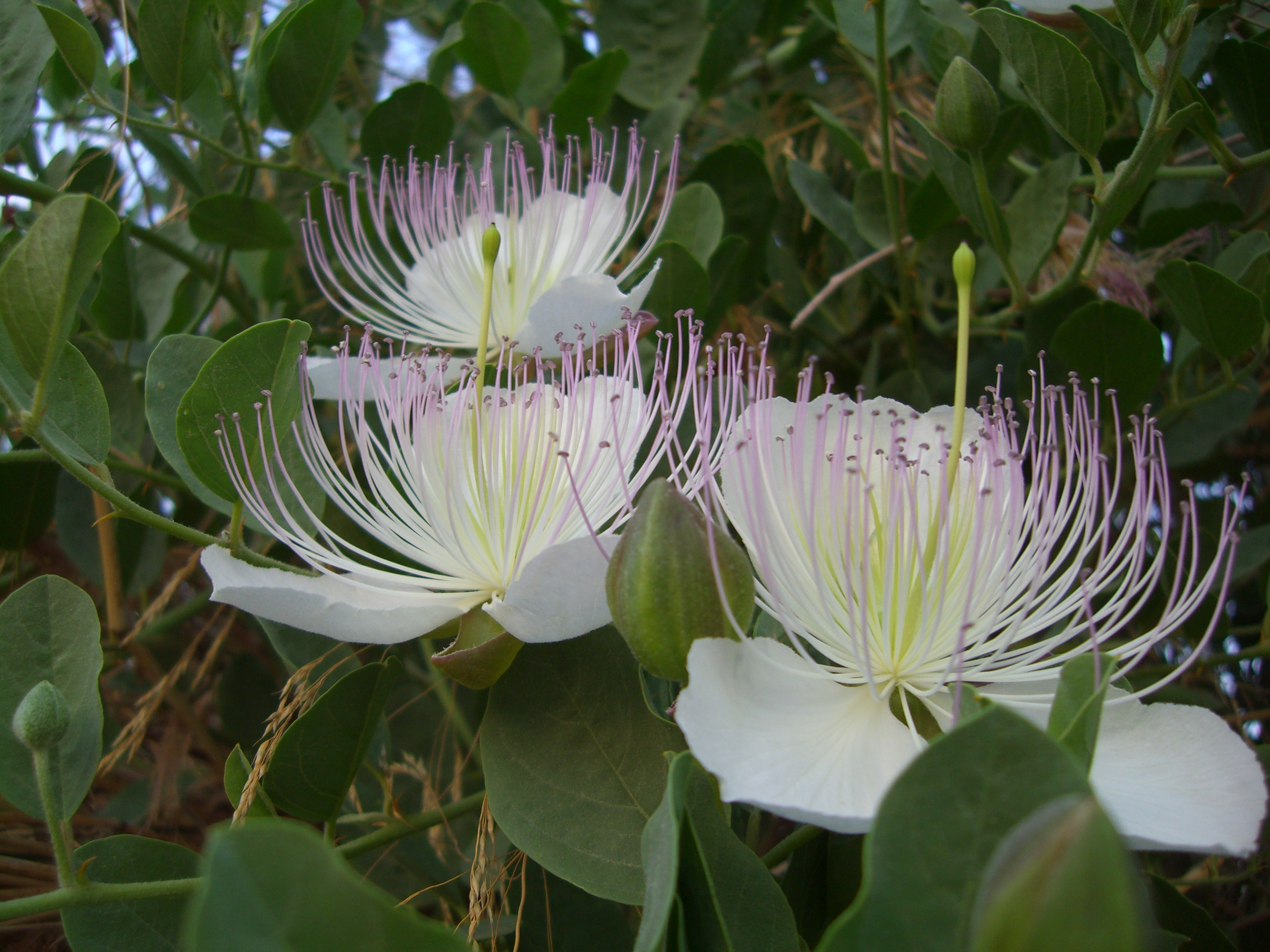
- Caper (Capparis spinosa)

Scientific classification
- Kingdom: Plantae
- Clade: Tracheophytes
- Clade: Angiosperms
- Clade: Eudicots
- Clade: Rosids
- Order: Brassicales
- Family: Capparaceae; Juss.

Genera
- See text

= Capparaceae =

Family of caper flowering plants

The Capparaceae (or Capparidaceae), commonly known as the caper family, are a family of plants in the order Brassicales. As currently circumscribed, the family contains 15 genera and about 430 species. The largest genera are Capparis (about 140 species), Morisonia (87 species), Maerua (70 species), Boscia (30 species), and Cadaba (30 species).

== Taxonomy ==
The Capparaceae have long been considered closely related to and have often been included in the Brassicaceae, the mustard family (APG, 1998), in part because both groups produce glucosinolate (mustard oil) compounds. Subsequent molecular studies support Capparaceae sensu stricto as paraphyletic with respect to the Brassicaceae. However Cleome and several related genera are more closely related to members of the Brassicaceae than to the other Capparaceae. These genera are now either placed in the Brassicaceae (as subfamily Clemoideae) or segregated into the Cleomaceae. Several more genera of the traditional Capparaceae are more closely related to other members of the Brassicales, and the relationships of several more remain unresolved. Based on morphological grounds and supported by molecular studies, the American species traditionally identified as Capparis have been transferred to resurrected generic names. Several new genera have also been recently described.

Based on recent DNA-analysis, the Capparaceae are part of the core Brassicales, and based on limited testing, the following tree represent current insights in its relationship.

- core Brassicales
  - - - - Resedaceae
        - family Gyrostemonaceae
      - family Pentadiplandraceae
    - - family Tovariaceae
      - - family Capparaceae
        - - family Cleomaceae
          - family Brassicaceae
  - family Emblingiaceae

== Genera ==
15 genera are accepted:

- Bachmannia Pax
- Beautempsia (Benth. & Hook.f.) Gaudich.
- Boscia Lam.
- Buchholzia Engl.
- Cadaba Forssk.
- Capparis L.
- Crateva L.
- Hypselandra Pax & K.Hoffm.
- Maerua Forssk.
- Morisonia L.
- Neocalyptrocalyx Hutch.
- Neothorelia Gagnep.
- Poilanedora Gagnep.
- Ritchiea R.Br. ex G.Don
- Thilachium Lour.

=== Excluded genera ===
- Borthwickia W.W.Sm. → Resedaceae
- Cleome L. → Cleomaceae
- Cleomella DC. → Cleomaceae
- Dactylaena Schrad. ex Schult.f. → Cleomaceae
- Forchhammeria Liebm. → Stixaceae
- Haptocarpum Ule → Cleomaceae
- Koeberlinia Zucc. → Koeberliniaceae
- Oxystylis Torr. & Frem. → Cleomaceae
- Pentadiplandra Baill. → Pentadiplandraceae
- Podandrogyne Ducke → Cleomaceae
- Polanisia Raf. → Cleomaceae
- Setchellanthus Brandegee → Setchellanthaceae
- Stixis Lour. → Stixaceae
- Tirania Pierre → Stixaceae
- Wislizenia Engelm. → Cleomaceae

Genus insufficiently known according to Kers in Kubitzki, but whose descriptions indicate it cannot belong to the Capparaceae

- Keithia Spreng. (unplaced)
