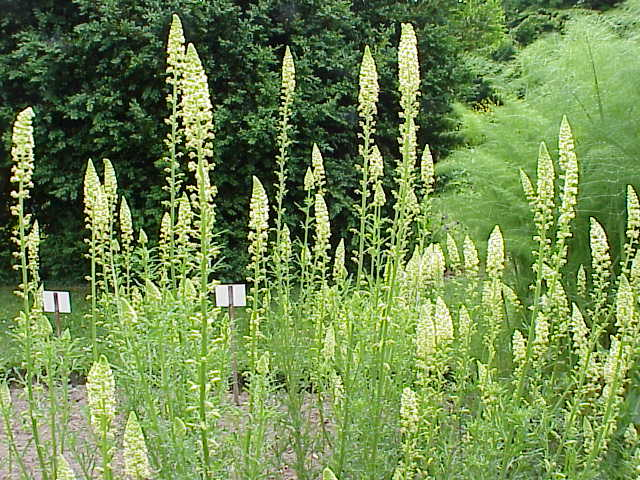
- Reseda lutea (Wild mignonette)

Scientific classification
- Kingdom: Plantae
- Clade: Tracheophytes
- Clade: Angiosperms
- Clade: Eudicots
- Clade: Rosids
- Order: Brassicales
- Family: Resedaceae; Martinov

Genera
- See text

= Resedaceae =

Family of flowering plants

Resedaceae is a family of mostly herbaceous dicotyledonous plants comprising 107 known species in 8 to 12 genera.

11 genera are currently accepted:

- Borthwickia W.W.Sm. - 1 species, sometimes placed in its own family Borthwickiaceae
- Caylusea A.St.-Hil. - 3 species
- Forchhammeria Liebm. - 10 species
- Ochradenus Delile - 8 species
- Ochradiscus S.Blanco & C.E.Wetzel - 2 species
- Oligomeris Cambess. - 3 species
- Randonia Coss. - 1 species
- Reseda Tourn. ex L. - ca 55 species
- Sesamoides Ortega - 1 species
- Stixis Lour. - 7 species
- Tirania Pierre – 1 species

== Taxonomy ==
Roman natural philosopher Gaius Plinius Secundus or Pliny the Elder, who lived in the first century, is attributed to have used the name Reseda for the first time in writing. But he must have used it for another plant, because the medical effect of healing swellings and inflammations that he described, could not be reproduced from Reseda by later researcher. The British botanist Samuel Frederick Gray erected the family Resedaceae in 1821, based on the type genus Reseda as validly described by Carl Linnaeus.

Recent molecular studies suggest that Oligomeris, Randonia and Ochradenus all arose from within the ranks of Reseda. This would imply that only three genera should be recognized, although as yet no nomenclatural changes have been made.

The family includes annuals, biennials and perennials and is distributed in temperate to sub-tropical regions of Europe, western Asia, the Middle East, East Asia, North America, Mesoamerica, the Caribbean and South Africa.

Resedaceae were placed under the Cronquist system in the order Capparales. The APG II system places it in the order Brassicales. In APG IV (2016) it was expanded to include the genera Borthwickia (formerly Borthwickiaceae), Neothorelia, Stixis, and Tirania (formerly Stixidaceae) and Forchhammeria (formerly in Capparaceae)
