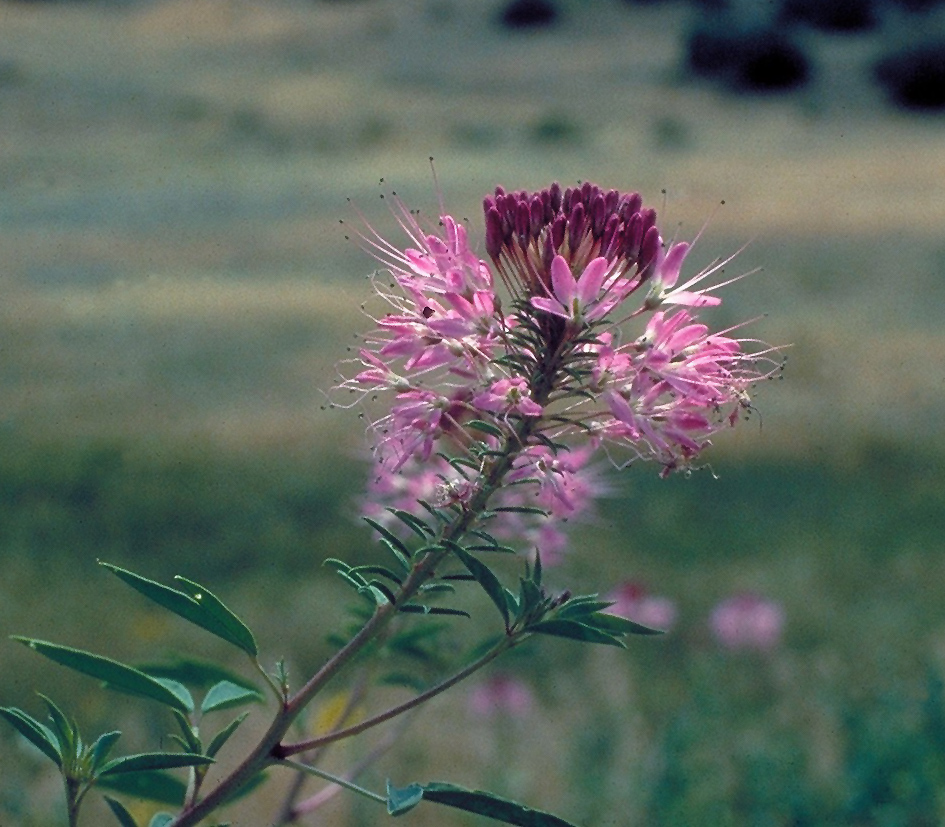

Conservation status
- Secure (NatureServe)

Scientific classification
- Kingdom: Plantae
- Clade: Tracheophytes
- Clade: Angiosperms
- Clade: Eudicots
- Clade: Rosids
- Order: Brassicales
- Family: Cleomaceae
- Genus: Cleomella
- Species: C. serrulata

Binomial name
- Cleomella serrulata (Pursh) Roalson & J.C.Hall (2015)

Synonyms
- Atalanta serrulata (Pursh) Raf. (1838); Cleome inornata (Greene) Greene (1901); Cleome integrifolia Torr. & Gray (1838); Cleome serrulata Pursh (1813); Pericla imbricata Raf. (1838); Peritoma angusta (M.E.Jones) Rydb. (1917); Peritoma inornata Greene in Pittonia 4: 210 (1900); Peritoma integrifolia Nutt. (1834); Peritoma serrulata DC. (1824)

= Cleomella serrulata =

Species of flowering plant

Cleomella serrulata (syns. Cleome serrulata and Peritoma serrulata), commonly known as Rocky Mountain beeplant/beeweed, stinking-clover, bee spider-flower, skunk weed, Navajo spinach, and guaco, is a species of annual plant in the genus Cleomella. Many species of insects are attracted to it, especially bees, which helps in the pollination of nearby plants. It is native to southern Canada and the western and central United States. The plant has often been used for food, to make dyes for paint, and as a treatment in traditional medicine.

== Taxonomy ==
In 1814, Frederick Traugott Pursh described this species in the first volume of Flora Americae Septentrionalis, based upon specimens collected by the Lewis and Clark Expedition near the Vermillion River in South Dakota.

In the first volume of Prodromus Systematis Naturalis Regni Vegetabilis in 1824, Augustin Pyramus de Candolle moved this species to a genus which he named Peritoma (replacing the earlier illegitimate name Atalanta Nuttall), and calling the species Peritoma serrulatum.

In 1901, Edward Lee Greene expanded Candolle's Peritoma, including this species as Peritoma serrulatum DC. and Peritoma lutem Raf. as well as two other species that he knew little about. At least Peritoma serrulata has been determined to be a synonym of Cleome serrulata.

== Description ==
Cleomella serrulata is an annual plant growing to 10–150 cm (4–59 in) tall, with spirally arranged leaves. The leaves are trifoliate, diminutive teeth, and with three slender leaflets each 1–7 cm (0.5–3 in) long. The flowers are reddish-purple, pink, or white, with four petals and six long stamens. The fruit is a capsule 3–6 cm (1–2.5 in) long containing several seeds. Flowering lasts an extended period because it begins at the bottom of the stalk and works its way up. The onset of flowering and seed pods comes at the same time. Cell wall elasticity is higher in specimens that live in drier climates. The pollen is about 0.015 millimeters (0.00059 in) in length with three furrows which have one pore each.

Moisture, temperature, and time are critical in seed germination. Germination occurs during summer and plants can quickly grow to 1–2 meters (3.3–6.6 ft). Flowers are often covered with a variety of insects, especially bees. Elongated capsules contain the seeds, which are dark brown to black, curved, and have a wart-like appearance. After the seeds are dispersed, the plants begin decomposing.

The plant is called waaʼ in the Navajo language, tumi in the Hopi language, and both aʼpilalu and ado꞉we in the Zuni language.

== Distribution and habitat ==
Cleomella serrulata is native in southern Canada from British Columbia to Ontario and in the United States from the west coast of the United States east to Ohio and southwest to Texas. It is also naturalized farther east in North America, including Maine. This species is often found in disturbed lands—such as roadsides, open woods, mountain foothills, and prairies. The plants prefer moist alkaline soils that are light or sandy. It grows in a wide range of pH levels and prefers mild shade or full sun while being drought tolerant. It is commonly found at elevations of 760–2,200 metres (2,490–7,220 ft) in the northern Rocky Mountains. It is often found with the following species: Pascopyrum smithii (western wheatgrass), Pseudoroegneria spicata (bluebunch wheatgrass), Koeleria macrantha (prairie Junegrass), Poa secunda (Sandberg bluegrass), Gaillardia aristata (common gaillardia), Artemisia tridentata (big sagebrush), and Ratibida columnifera (prairie coneflower).

== Uses ==
Cleomella serrulata has been used in the southwestern United States as a food, medicine, and dye since prehistoric times and is one of very few wild foods still in use. As food, its seeds can be eaten raw or cooked, or dried and ground into meal for use as a mush. The tender leaves, flowers and shoots can be cooked and eaten as a cooked vegetable or added to cornmeal porridge. Among the Zuni, the leaves gathered in large quantities and hung indoors to dry for winter use. The young leaves are cooked with corn strongly flavored with chili peppers. To reduce its bitter taste, pieces of iron or rust were sometimes added to the cooking pot. Animals rarely feed on this plant because of its disagreeable taste and odor. Nitrate poisoning can result if too much is consumed. Birds do eat the seeds, and the plant provides good cover for land reclamation and upland birds. The Tewa and other Southwestern United States tribes often included Cleome serrulata as a 'fourth sister' in the Three Sisters agriculture system because it attracts bees to help pollinate the beans and squash.

In traditional Native American and frontier medicine, an infusion of the plant is used to treat stomach troubles and fevers, and poultices made from it can be used on the eyes. As a dye, the plant can be boiled down until it is reduced to a thick, black syrup; this was used as a binder in pigments for painting black-on-white pottery at least as long ago as 900-1300 by the Ancestral Puebloans. The Navajo still use it to make yellow-green dye for their rugs and blankets. Plant paste is used with black mineral paint to color sticks of plume offerings to anthropic gods, and the whole plant except for the root is used in pottery decorations.

== Ecology ==
The flowers are attractive to and support a wide variety of pollinators. It is a larval host to the checkered white.

== Gallery ==
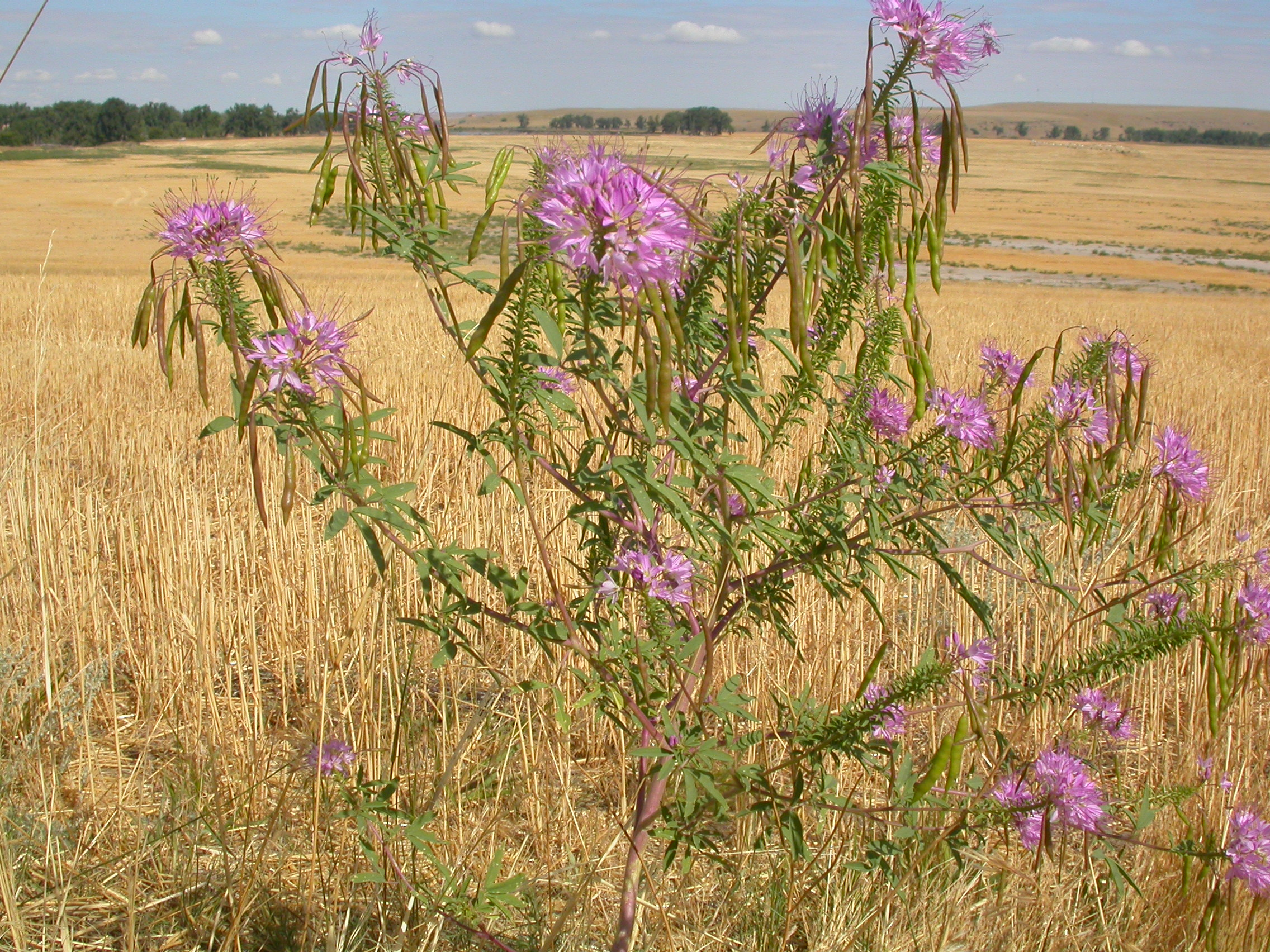
Habitat

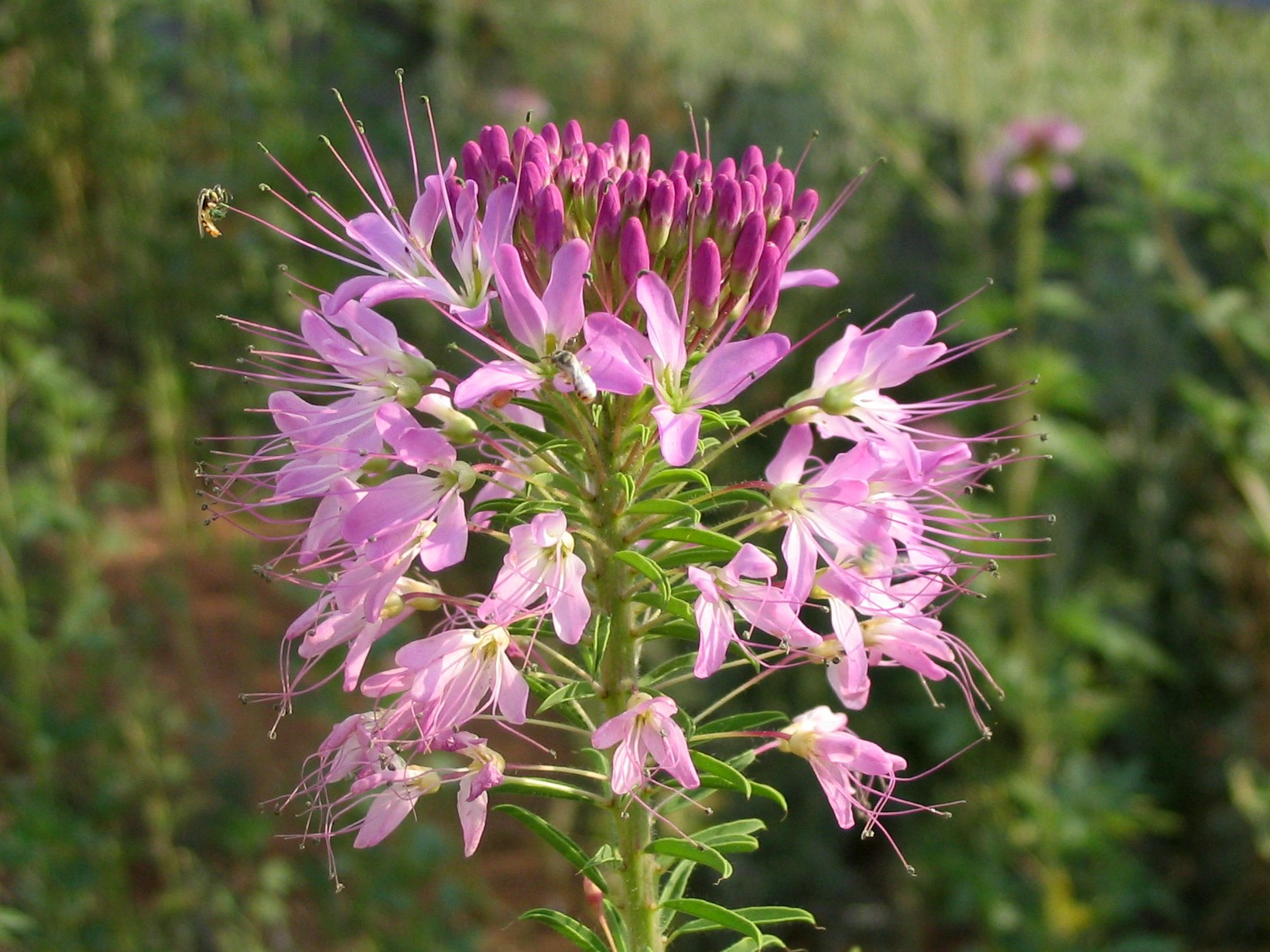
Purple flowers

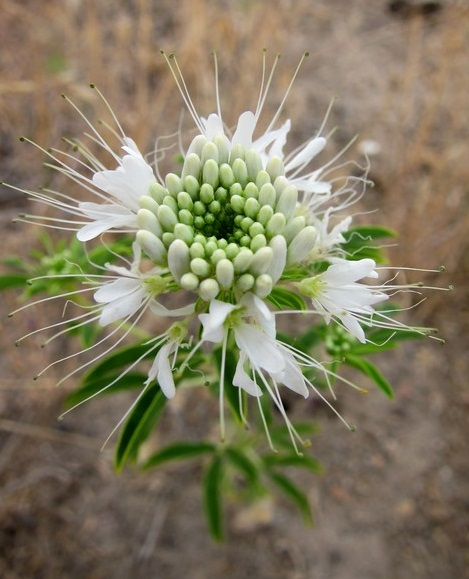
White flowers

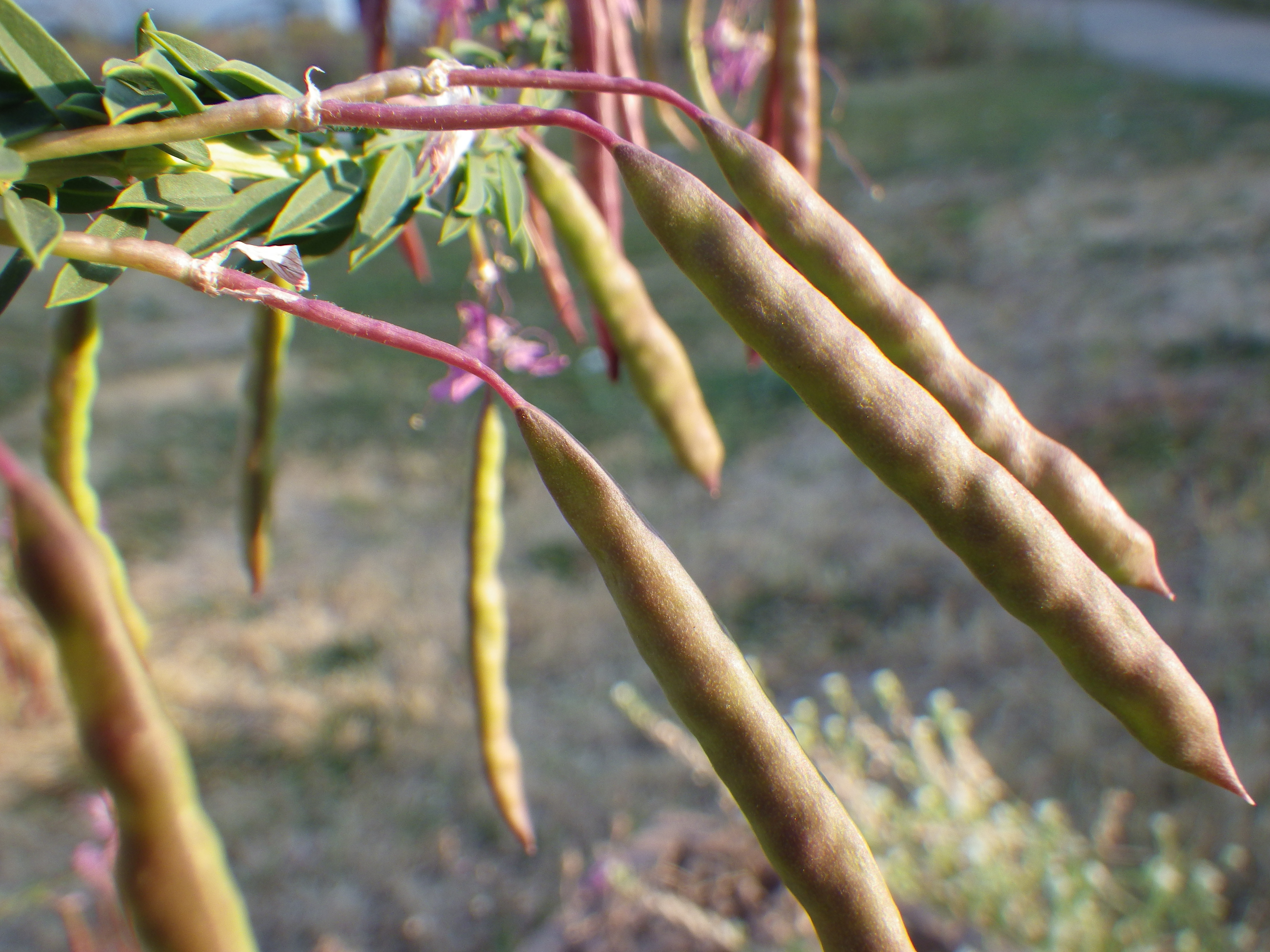
Fruit
