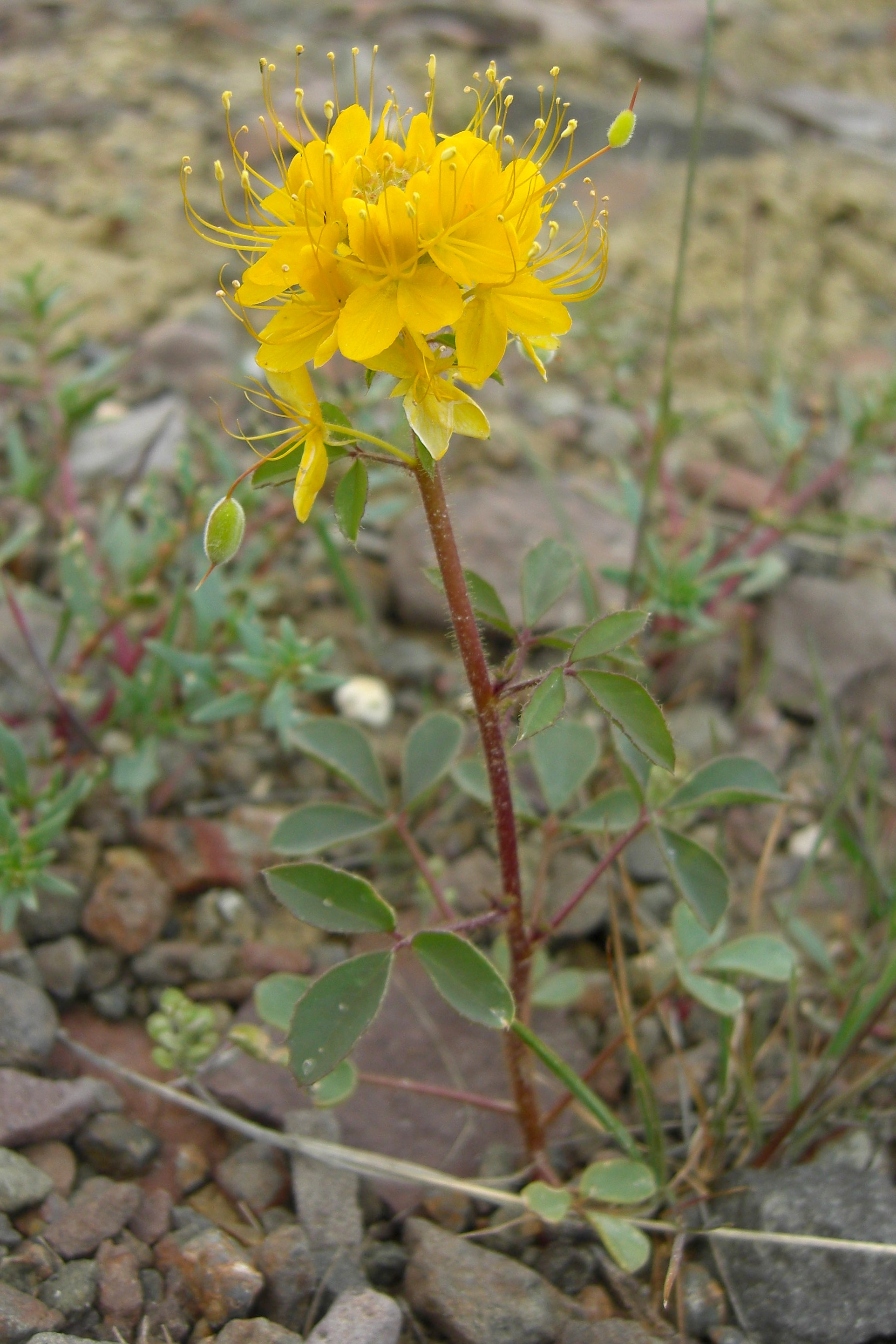

Scientific classification
- Kingdom: Plantae
- Clade: Tracheophytes
- Clade: Angiosperms
- Clade: Eudicots
- Clade: Rosids
- Order: Brassicales
- Family: Cleomaceae
- Genus: Cleomella
- Species: C. platycarpa

Binomial name
- Cleomella platycarpa (Torr.) Roalson & J.C.Hall (2015)

Synonyms
- Celome platycarpa Greene (1900); Cleome platycarpa Torr. (1857); Peritoma platycarpa (Torr.) Iltis (2007)

= Cleomella platycarpa =

Species of flowering plant

Cleomella platycarpa is a species of flowering plant in the cleome family known by the common names golden bee plant and golden spiderflower. It is native to the western United States from northeastern California to Idaho, including the Modoc Plateau, where it grows on clay and volcanic soils in the sagebrush. It is an annual herb branching at the base into several erect stems up to about 60 centimetres (24 in) tall. The stems are green tinted with purple, coated densely in glandular hairs, and lined with many leaves. Each leaf is divided into three small leaflets. The top of each stem is occupied by a raceme of many flowers. Each flower has generally four yellow sepals and four yellow petals around a center of many yellow stamens. The fruit is a flat, hairy capsule up to 2.5 centimeters long which hangs on the long, remaining flower receptacle. Found between 800–1200m.

Some Plateau Indian tribes used an infusion of golden spiderflower to treat children's colds, and rubbed on a mash to treat fevers.

The species is similar to Cleomella lutea, but differs in the leaves and capsule shape.
