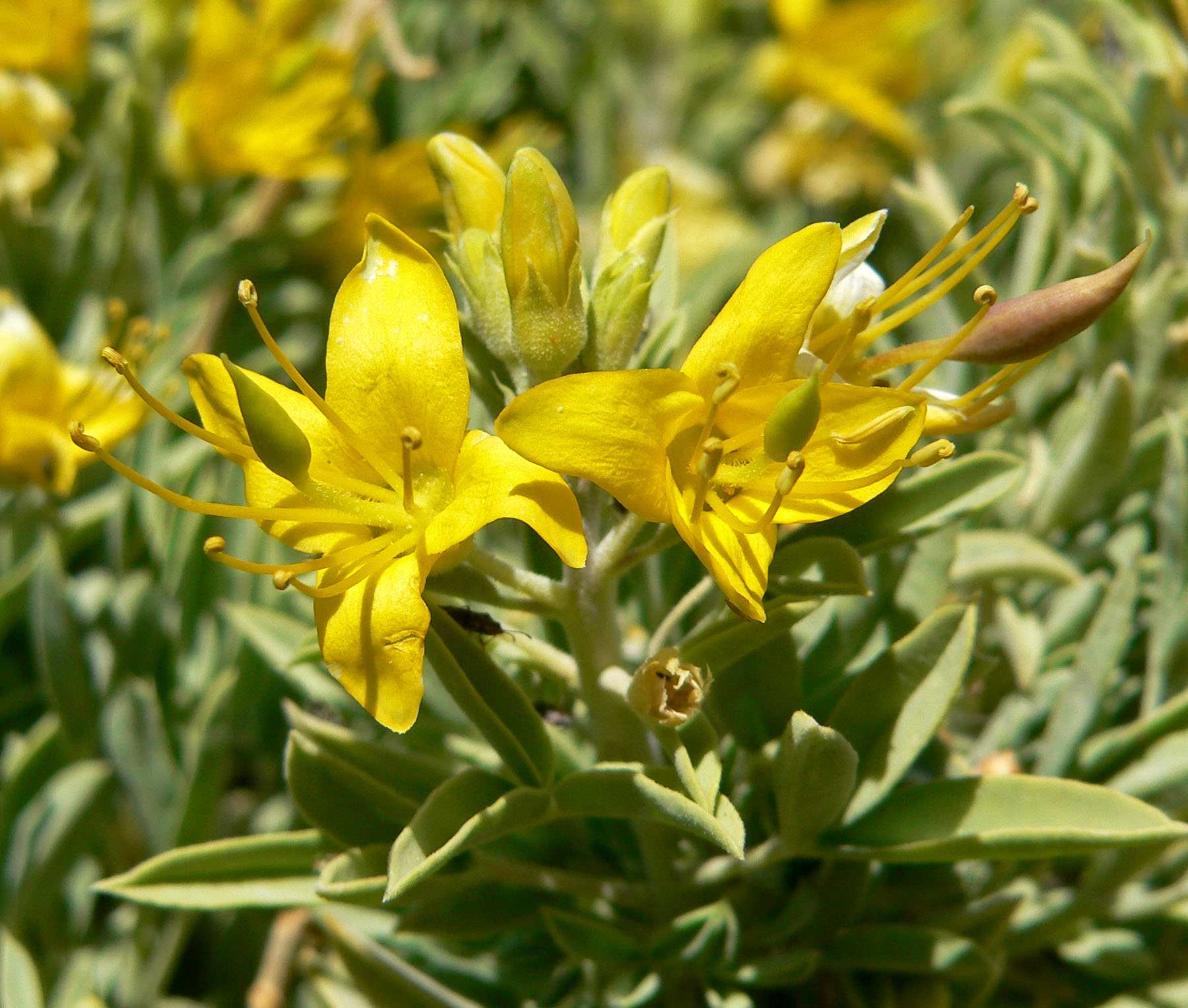

Conservation status
- Apparently Secure (NatureServe)

Scientific classification
- Kingdom: Plantae
- Clade: Tracheophytes
- Clade: Angiosperms
- Clade: Eudicots
- Clade: Rosids
- Order: Brassicales
- Family: Cleomaceae
- Genus: Cleomella
- Species: C. arborea

Binomial name
- Cleomella arborea (Nutt.) Roalson & J.C.Hall

Varieties
- Cleomella arborea var. angustata (Parish) J.C.Hall & Roalson; Cleomella arborea var. arborea; Cleomella arborea var. globosa (Coville) J.C.Hall & Roalson

Synonyms
- Cleome isomeris Greene; Isomeris arborea Nutt.; Peritoma arborea (Nutt.) Iltis

= Cleomella arborea =

Species of shrub

Cleomella arborea is a perennial shrub or bush in the spiderflower family (Cleomaceae) known by the common names bladderpod, bladderpod spiderflower, and burro-fat. It is native to Southern California and the Baja California Peninsula, where it grows in brushland, deserts, and on the coastal bluffs. It blooms bright yellow flowers nearly year-round, and it also provides food for hummingbirds, bees, and birds. The plant also has a strong odor and contains glucocapparin, it’s a chemical that keeps a lot of plant-eating insects away, but the harlequin bug is adapted to feed on it. Several Native American groups cooked and ate its flowers and pods.

== Range and habitat ==
Cleomella arborea is commonly found along roadsides, desert dry washes, and flat areas up to 4,200 feet (1,300 m) in the western Mojave Desert and Colorado Desert to the Baja California Peninsula. It is native to California and the Baja California Peninsula where it grows in a variety of habitats usually described as desert or brush.

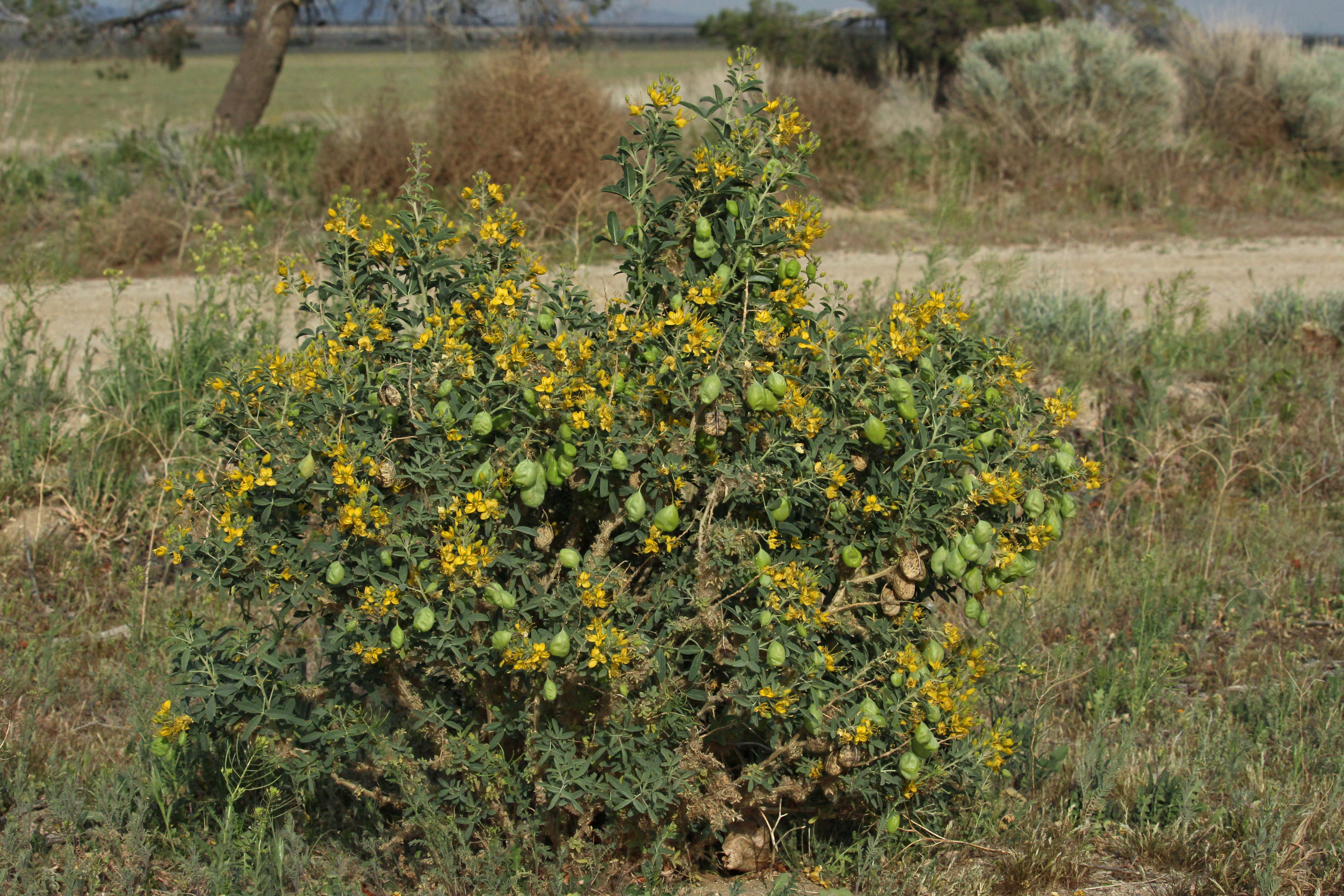
A typical individual bears flowers and fruit in various stages of development.

== Description ==
It is a densely branching shrub 0.5–2 metres (1 ft 8 in – 6 ft 7 in) high covered with tiny hairs. Its stalked leaves are generally composed of three equal leaflets 15–45 millimetres (0.6–1.8 in) long, oval to elliptic in shape and pointed at the tip. The plant produces abundant inflorescences at the ends of the stem branches much of the year. The four sepals are fused about halfway from their base. Each flower has four bright yellow 8–14 millimetres (0.3–0.6 in) long petals, six protruding 15–25 millimetres (0.6–1.0 in) stamens with 2–2.5 millimetres (0.1–0.1 in) anthers. The style is 0.9–1.2 millimetres (0.04–0.05 in) or aborts before flowering. The fruit is a leathery prolate spheroid capsule 30–60 millimetres (1.2–2.4 in) long and 10–25 millimetres (0.4–1.0 in) wide on a 10–20 millimetres (0.4–0.8 in) stalk. It is smooth and green when new, aging to light brown.

A typical inflorescence bears a number of flower buds at its tip, open flowers proximal to the buds, and maturing fruits which have shed their flowers below these.

In the previous genus name, Isomeris, "iso" means "equal", and "meris" means "part", referring to the stamens being of equal length.

== Ecology ==
Blooming throughout the year, C. arborea provides a nectar source for pollinators such as bees, butterflies, and hummingbirds The flower part of the plant also sticks out so the pollen can be reached easily. A few birds, like quail, finches, sparrows, and doves, have been known to be seen around the plant. The plant is adapted to arid environments and tolerates dry soil and conditions.

Harlequin bugs find the bladderpod a staple when it comes to food, as they eat almost all parts of the plant, like the sap of the flowers, its leaves, and pods. Harlequin bugs are adapted to its chemicals. The chemicals are inside the plant, and the bugs get them by eating it, which protect them from predators. A single bug can spend its entire life on one plant.Females lay eggs in clusters of 12 and they end up on the undersides of the leaves and look like tiny white barrels standing in two rows.

== Ethnobotany ==
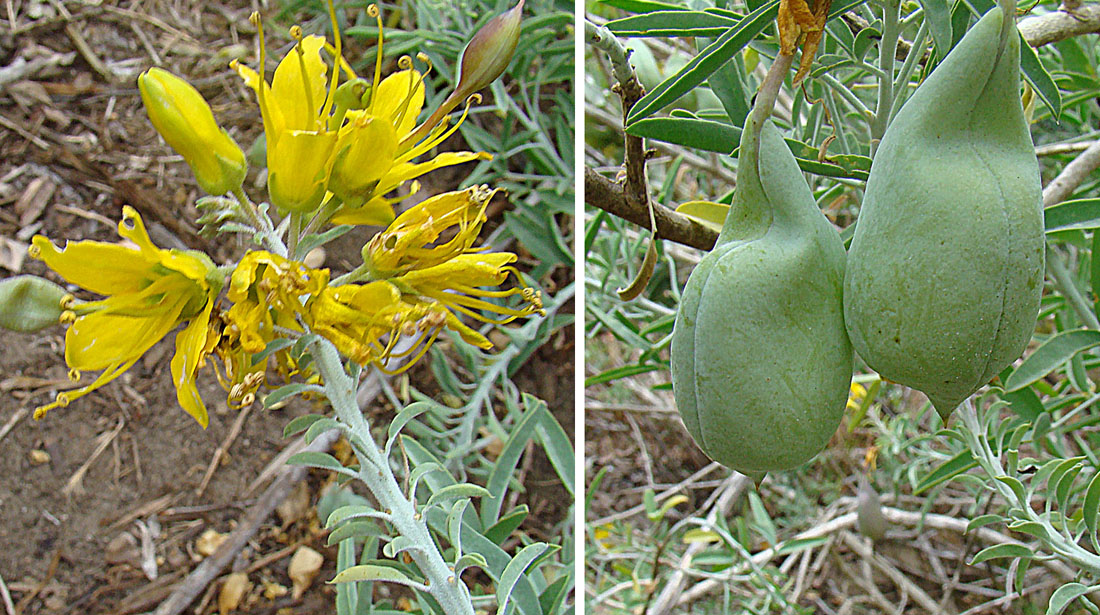
Desirable parts of the plant chosen for consumption were flowers (pictured to the left) and the pea pods (pictured to the right).

Various parts of bladderpod have been used by many tribes indigenous to California and Baja California. The seeds and flowers were eaten by the Diegueño (former Spanish name for Kumeyaay) and Kawaiisu tribes. The tribes would boil the gathered plants to remove any bitter taste. The Kawaiisu tribe also prepared the flowers by cooking them in the dirt with hot rocks overnight until flowers turned red. The Cahuilla tribes prepared the pods in a similar fashion as the Kawaiisu; they cooked immature pods in the ground using hot stones. The Kumeyaay preferred to consume the flowers of the plant rather than the leaves or pods. After cooking, they ate the flowers alone or with other ingredients, commonly eaten alongside tortillas or acorn mush.

The immature pea pods of the plant resemble garden peas and are edible small quantities; they may be used similarly to capers. Cooking was often used to remove the bitter characteristics of the plant which derive from glucocapparin.
