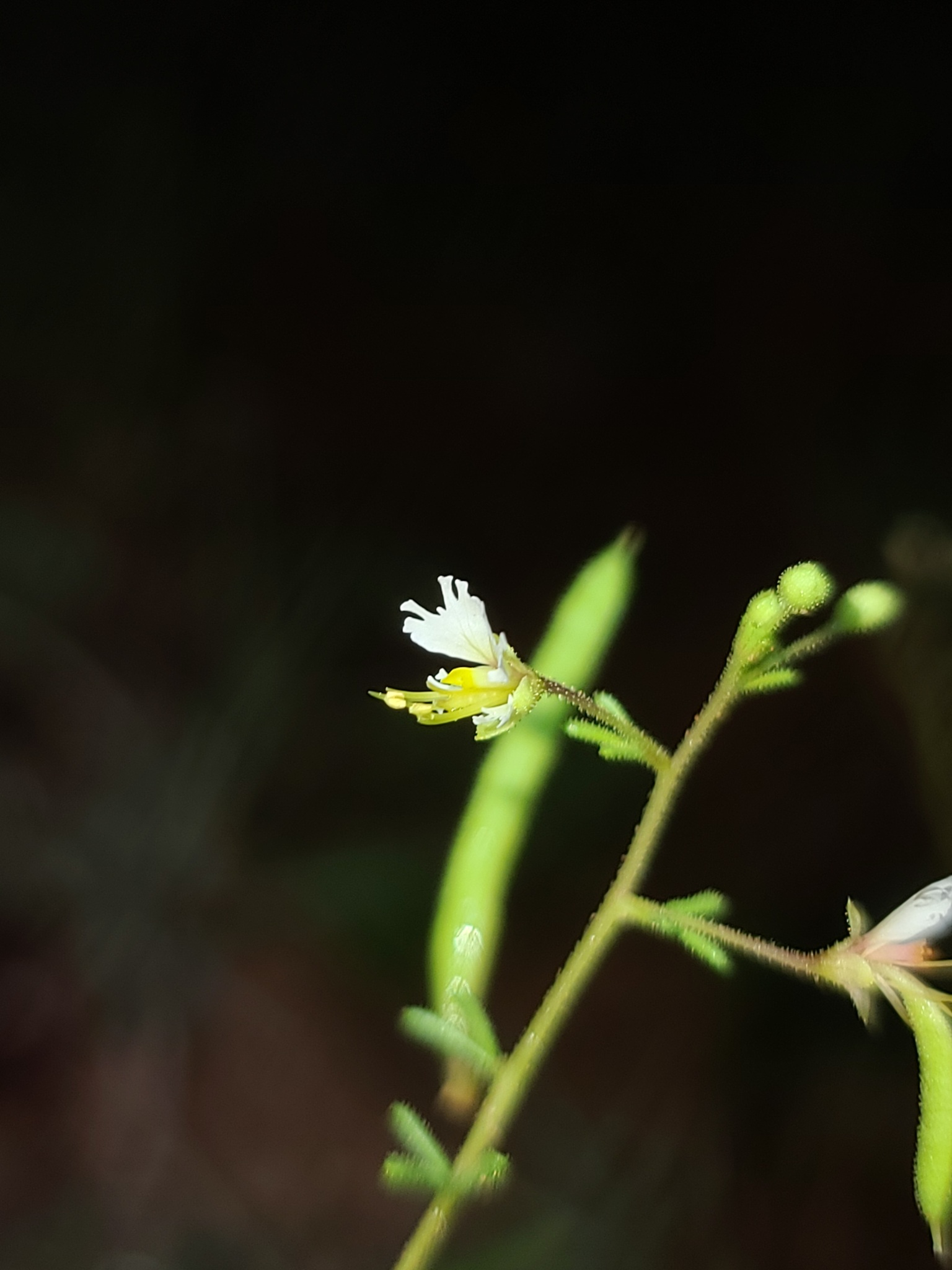

Conservation status
- Secure (NatureServe)

Scientific classification
- Kingdom: Plantae
- Clade: Tracheophytes
- Clade: Angiosperms
- Clade: Eudicots
- Clade: Rosids
- Order: Brassicales
- Family: Cleomaceae
- Genus: Polanisia
- Species: P. jamesii

Binomial name
- Polanisia jamesii (Torr. & A. Gray) Iltis

Synonyms
- Cristatella jamesii Torr. & A. Gray; Cyrbasium jamesii (Torr. & A. Gray) Endl. ex Walp.

= Polanisia jamesii =

Species of flowering plant

Polanisia jamesii, common name James's clammyweed, is a plant species native to the central part of the United States. It is reported from Minnesota, Wisconsin, Ohio, Indiana, Illinois, Iowa, South Dakota, Nebraska, Colorado, New Mexico, Texas and Oklahoma. It generally prefers sandy, disturbed soils. The species is considered locally endangered within the state of Minnesota. The species is also considered locally endangered within the state of Illinois.

Polanisia jamesii is an annual herb with branched stems, producing pale yellow flowers on a terminal raceme.
