= O. lutea =

O. lutea may refer to:

- Odontadenia lutea, a vine native to South America
- Odostomia lutea, a sea snail
- Oiketicoides lutea, a moth native to the Mediterranean
- Oncis lutea, synonym of Platevindex luteus
- Ophiocordyceps lutea, a parasitic fungus
- Ophrys lutea, an orchid native to the Mediterranean
- Orchis lutea, synonym of Dactylorhiza sambucina
- Orobanche lutea, synonym of Orobanche variegata
- Oxystylis lutea, synonym of Cleomella oxystyloides
