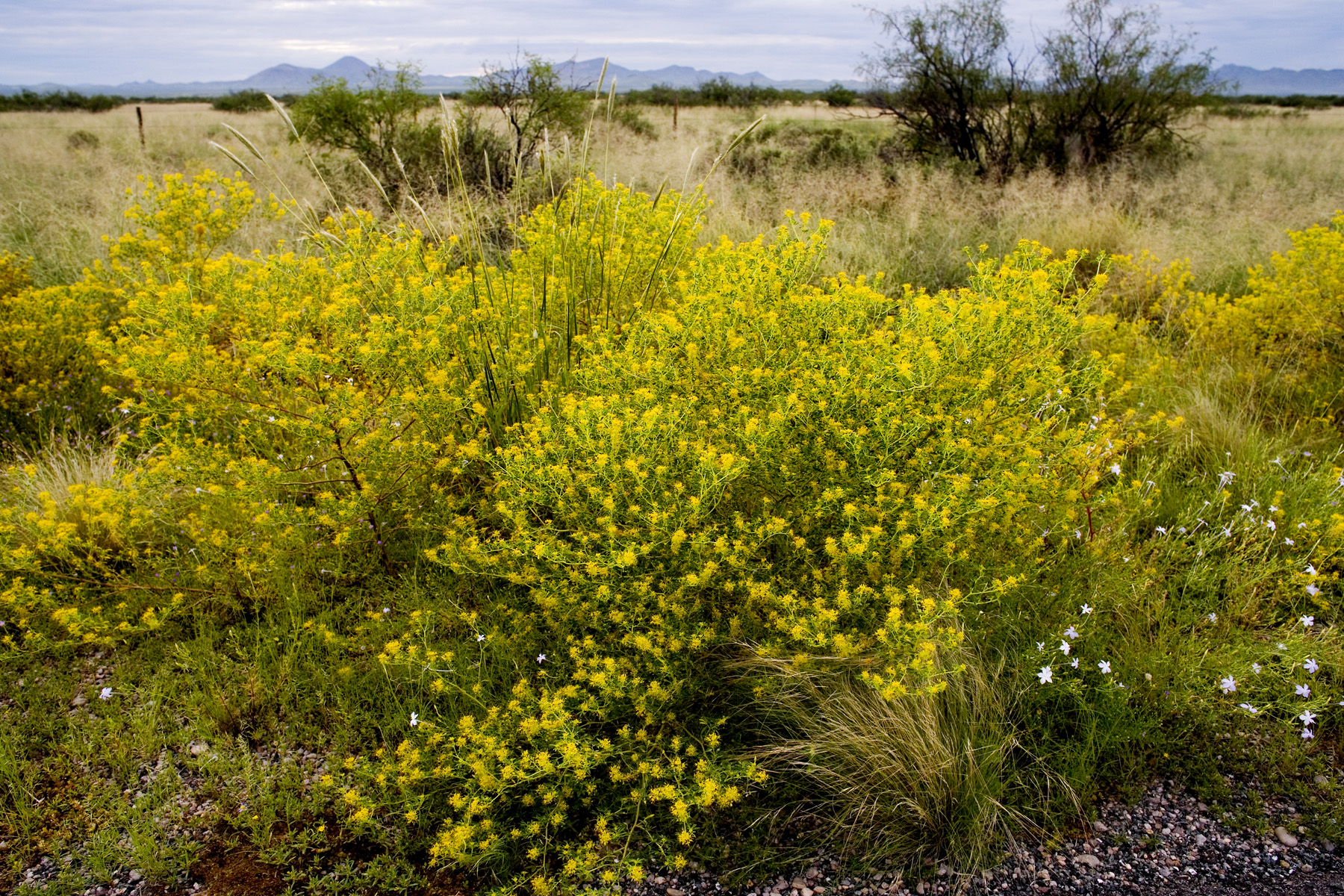

Scientific classification
- Kingdom: Plantae
- Clade: Tracheophytes
- Clade: Angiosperms
- Clade: Eudicots
- Clade: Rosids
- Order: Brassicales
- Family: Cleomaceae
- Genus: Cleomella
- Species: C. refracta

Binomial name
- Cleomella refracta (Engelm.) J.C.Hall & Roalson (2015)

Synonyms
- Cleome refracta (Engelm.) Mabb. (2017); Cleomella coulteri Harv. ex A.Gray (1852); Wislizenia costellata Rose ex Greene (1906); Wislizenia melilotoides Greene (1906); Wislizenia refracta Engelm. (1848); Wislizenia refracta var. melilotoides (Greene) I.M. Johnst. (1924); Wislizenia scabrida Eastw. (1903)

= Cleomella refracta =

Species of flowering plant

Cleomella refracta, common names jackass clover or spectacle fruit, is a species of flowering plant in the cleome family, Cleomaceae. It is native to northwestern Mexico and the southwestern United States, particularly Chihuahua, Sonora, trans-Pecos Texas, New Mexico, Arizona, Utah, Nevada and California (Riverside, Kern and San Bernardino Counties). The species occurs in sandy flats, desert scrub and disturbed sites such as roadsides.

Cleomella refracta is an annual herb up to 200 cm (78.5 in) tall. Leaves are trifoliate, the leaflets ovate (egg-shaped), up to 5 cm (2 in) long. Its flowers are yellow.
