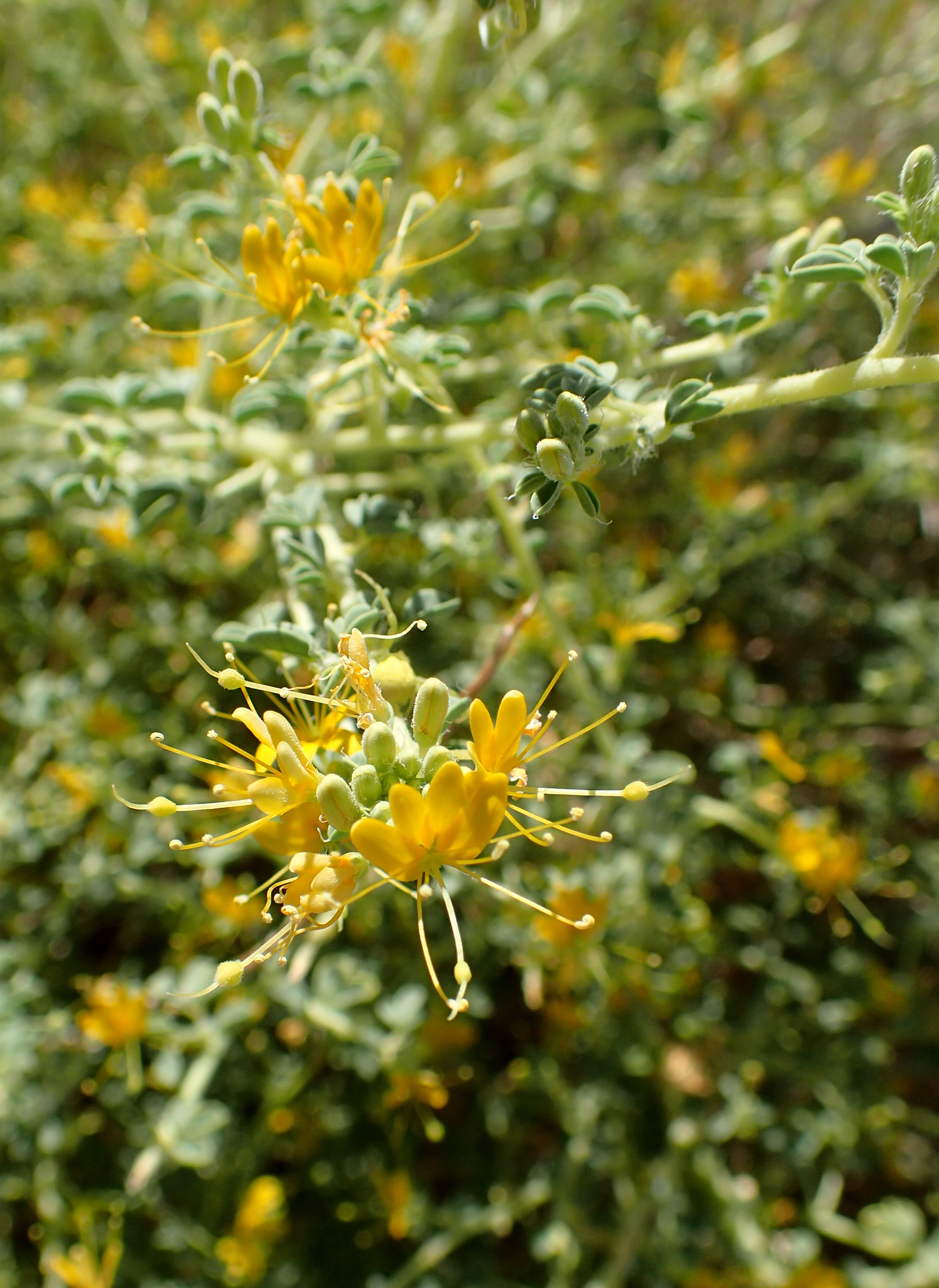

Conservation status
- Vulnerable (NatureServe)

Scientific classification
- Kingdom: Plantae
- Clade: Tracheophytes
- Clade: Angiosperms
- Clade: Eudicots
- Clade: Rosids
- Order: Brassicales
- Family: Cleomaceae
- Genus: Cleomella
- Species: C. obtusifolia

Binomial name
- Cleomella obtusifolia Torr. & Frém.

= Cleomella obtusifolia =

Species of flowering plant

Cleomella obtusifolia is a species of flowering plant in the cleome family. It is commonly known as Mojave stinkweed, bluntleaf stinkweed or Mojave Cleomella. It grows in alkaline soils in the desert scrub. It is an annual herb producing a rough, hairy stem. The branching stem grows erect when new and then the branches droop to the ground with age, forming a bushy clump or mat. Each leaf is made up of three fleshy oval leaflets. Flowers appear in dense racemes on older stems and solitary in leaf axils on new stems. Each flower has generally four hairy green sepals and four yellow petals grouped together on one side of the involucre. The whiskery yellow stamens protrude up to 1.5 centimeters from the flower. The fruit is a hairy, valved capsule a few millimeters in length. It hangs at the tip of the remaining flower receptacle.
