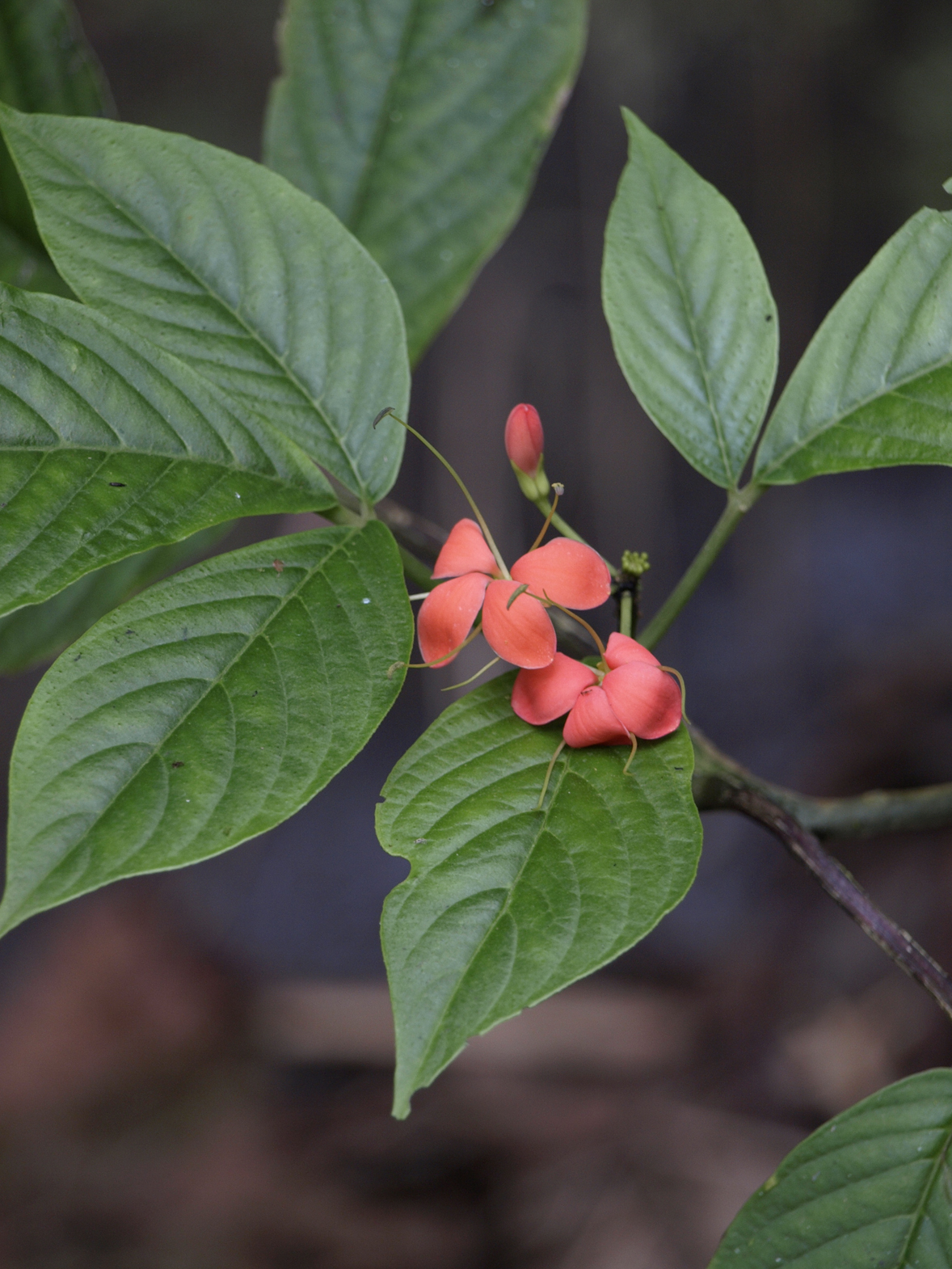
- Podandrogyne decipiens

Scientific classification
- Kingdom: Plantae
- Clade: Tracheophytes
- Clade: Angiosperms
- Clade: Eudicots
- Clade: Rosids
- Order: Brassicales
- Family: Cleomaceae
- Genus: Podandrogyne; Ducke

= Podandrogyne =

Genus of flowering plants

Podandrogyne is a genus of flowering plants in the family Cleomaceae. They are closely related to genus Cleome.

Species include:

- Podandrogyne brevipedunculata Cochrane
- Podandrogyne caucana
- Podandrogyne cernua
- Podandrogyne chiriquensis
- Podandrogyne chocoensis
- Podandrogyne coccinea
- Podandrogyne decipiens
- Podandrogyne densiflora
- Podandrogyne formosa
- Podandrogyne glabra
- Podandrogyne gracilis
- Podandrogyne hispidula
- Podandrogyne jamesonii (Briq.) Cochrane
- Podandrogyne mathewsii
- Podandrogyne trichopus (Benth.) H.H.Iltis & Cochrane
