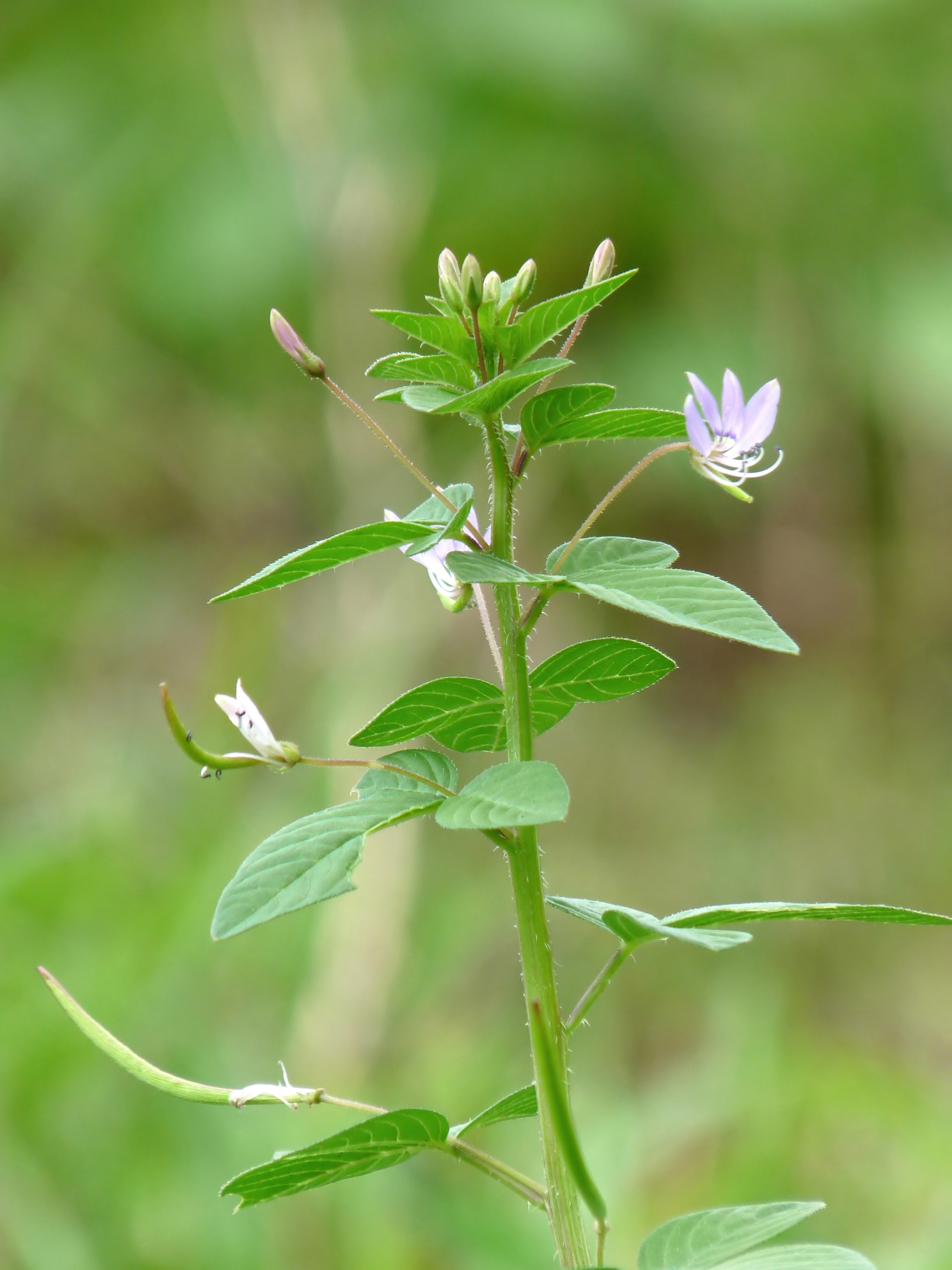
- Cleome rutidosperma from Kerala, India

Scientific classification
- Kingdom: Plantae
- Clade: Tracheophytes
- Clade: Angiosperms
- Clade: Eudicots
- Clade: Rosids
- Order: Brassicales
- Family: Cleomaceae
- Genus: Cleome
- Species: C. rutidosperma

Binomial name
- Cleome rutidosperma DC.

Synonyms
- Cleome ciliata Schumach. & Thonn.

= Cleome rutidosperma =

Species of flowering plant

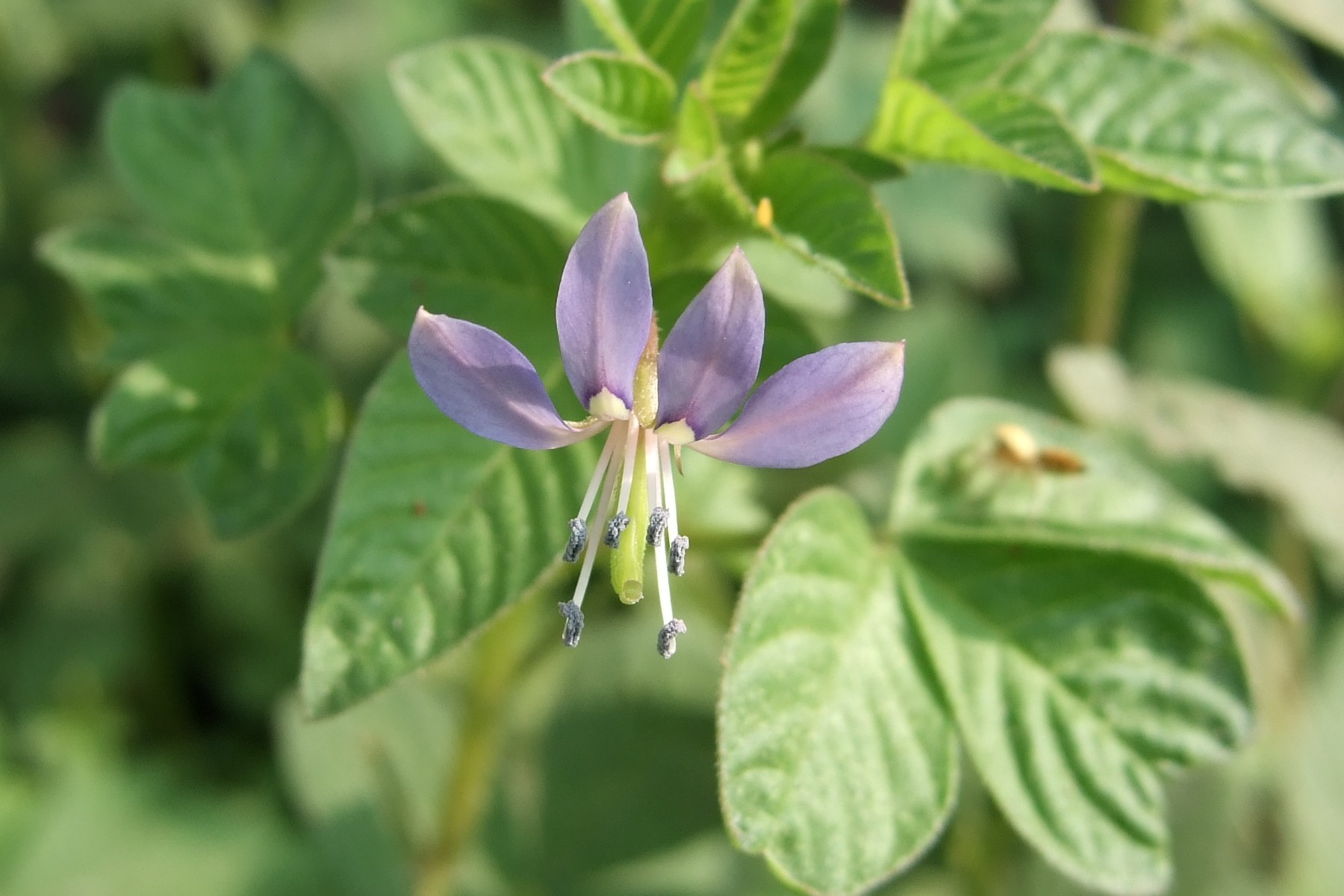
Cleome rutidosperma from Taiwan

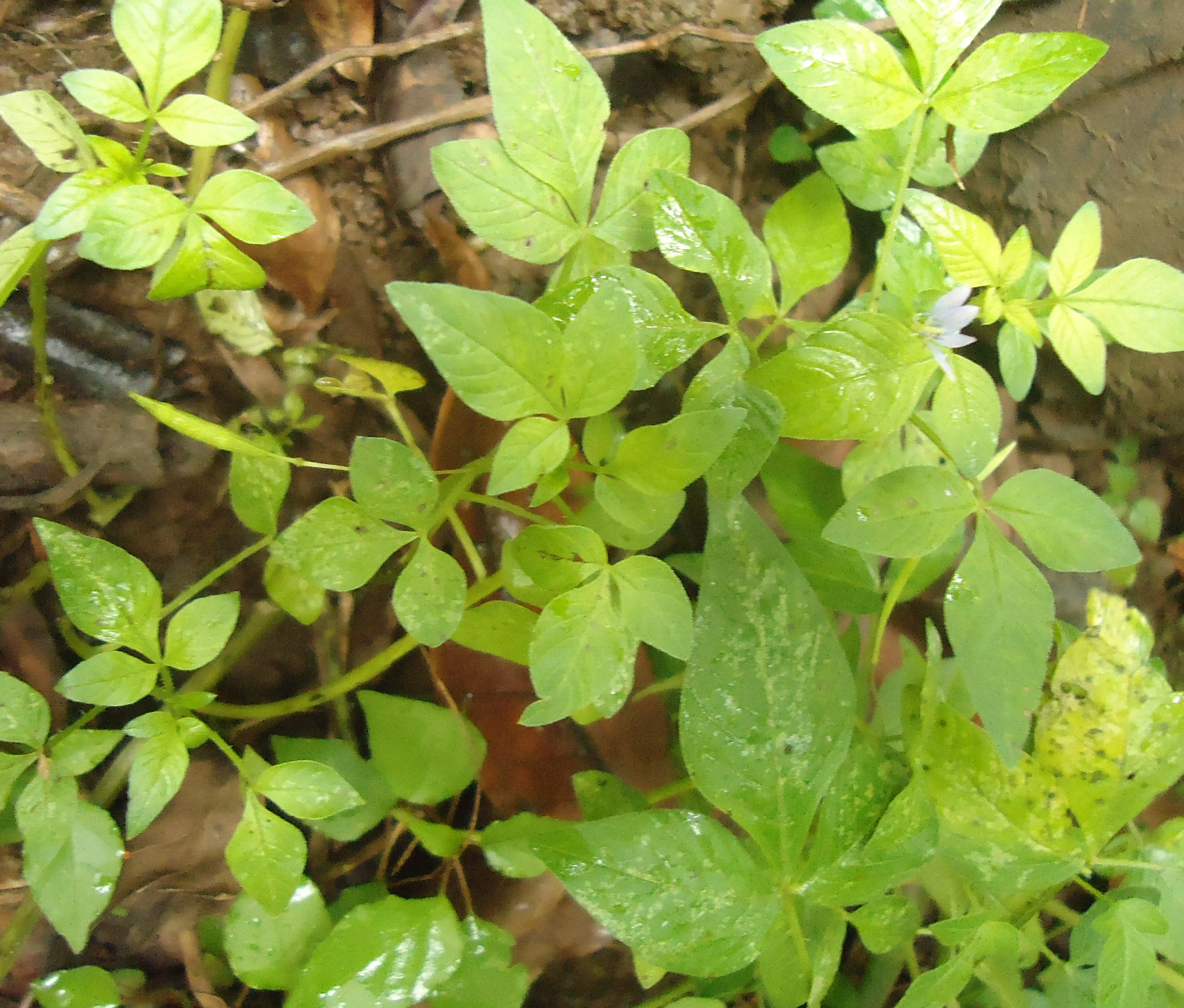
Cleome rutidosperma from the Philippines

Cleome rutidosperma, commonly known as fringed spider flower or purple cleome, is a species of flowering plant in the genus Cleome of the family Cleomaceae, native to tropical Africa. This species is an invasive weed throughout most lowland wet tropical areas of Asia and Australia. It is a very common weed of lawns.

== Description ==
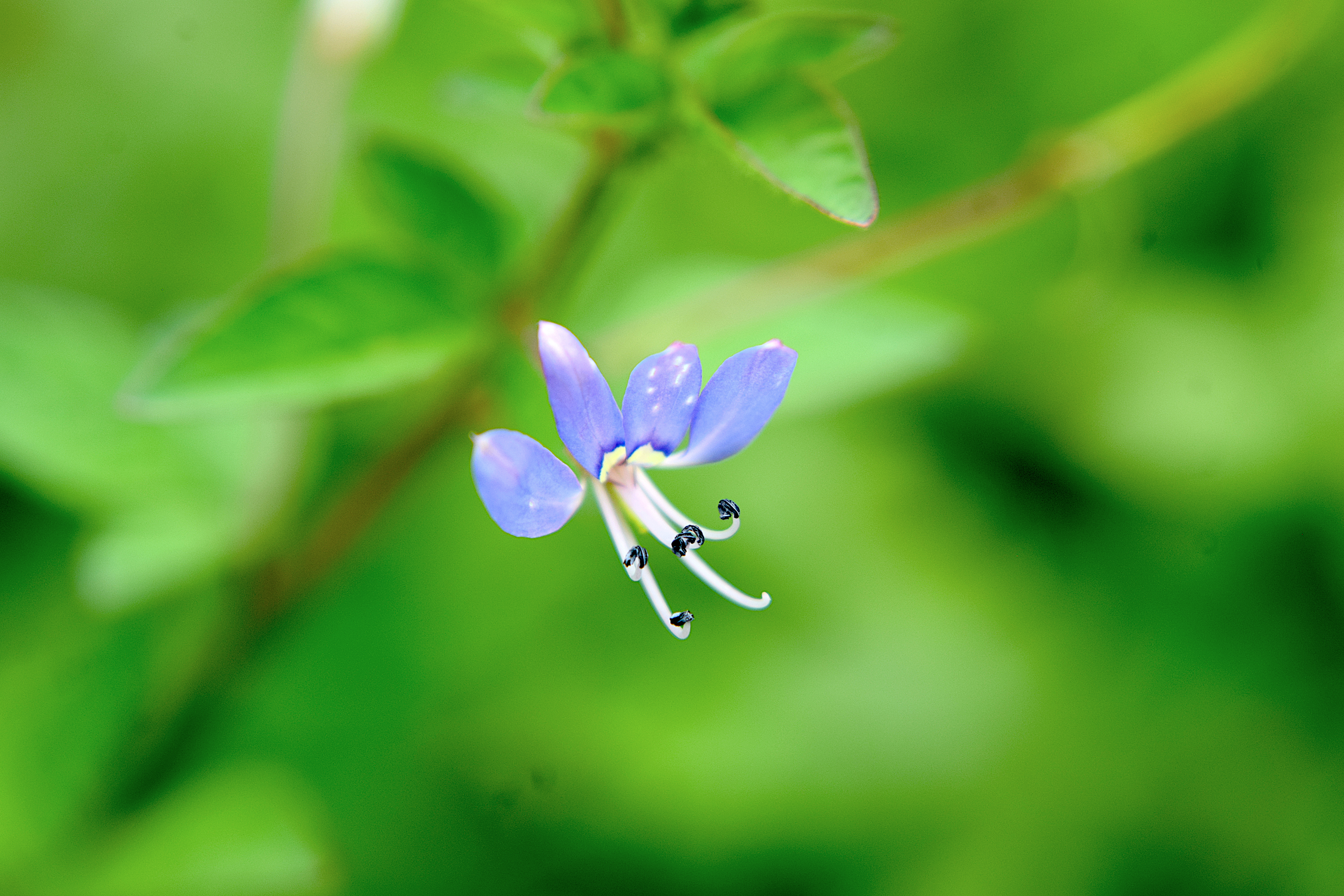
Flower of Cleome rutidosperma from the Kerala

Cleome rutidosperma is a small herbaceous plant usually growing up to 50 to 70 cm (20 to 28 in) but can reach up to 1 m (3.3 ft) in height. The leaves are trifoliate.

Cleome rutidosperma grows rapidly and can produce numerous viable seeds quickly. Their seeds are produced inside pods that split open when dry. They are black in color and vary in size from 7 to 16 millimetres (0.28 to 0.63 in) in length. They also contain elaiosomes, fleshy structures rich in protein and lipids. The seeds are collected and stored underground by ants. The elaiosomes are eaten, but the seed remains untouched and will eventually sprout from underground. This hastens the spread of the plants.

== Taxonomy and nomenclature ==
Other common names of C. rutidosperma include:

- Chinese - zhou zi bai hua cai
- Odia - anasorisho
- Swahili - mgagani
- Tagalog - seru-walai, tamil-malaya

== Distribution and habitat ==
Cleome rutidosperma is native to West Africa, where its habitat is usually along coastal regions but can extend to inland areas. It has been introduced to other parts of the world and is now found in tropical and subtropical regions of Africa, Asia, America, the Pacific, and Oceania.

Cleome rutidosperma are usually found growing in recently disturbed soils, including gardens, roadsides, and fields. They can also grow as epiphytes on rock faces and trees.

== Economic importance ==
Cleome rutidosperma is considered a weed. It has a moderate impact on field crops where it has been introduced.

The leaves of C. rutidosperma are edible and are eaten as food in Africa (particularly by pregnant or breast-feeding women) and in India (where the leaves are known as sag). They are also used in ethnomedicine for treating ear inflammation, convulsions, irritated skin, and malaria. The roots are also used as an antihelminthic, analgesic, and anti-inflammatory.

Medical research have confirmed that C. rutidosperma exhibits moderate activity against Plasmodium falciparum. Studies have also shown potent activity of C. rutidosperma against arthritis.
