= Podandrogyne trichopus =

Conservation status
- Critically Endangered (IUCN 3.1)

Scientific classification
- Kingdom: Plantae
- Clade: Tracheophytes
- Clade: Angiosperms
- Clade: Eudicots
- Clade: Rosids
- Order: Brassicales
- Family: Cleomaceae
- Genus: Podandrogyne
- Species: P. trichopus

Binomial name
- Podandrogyne trichopus (Benth.) H.H.Iltis & Cochrane

Synonyms
- Gynandropsis trichopus Benth.

Species of flowering plant

Podandrogyne trichopus is a species of plant in the Capparaceae family. It is endemic to Ecuador. Its natural habitats are subtropical or tropical dry forests, subtropical or tropical moist lowland forests, and subtropical or tropical moist montane forests. It is threatened by habitat loss.

The species is unplaced.
