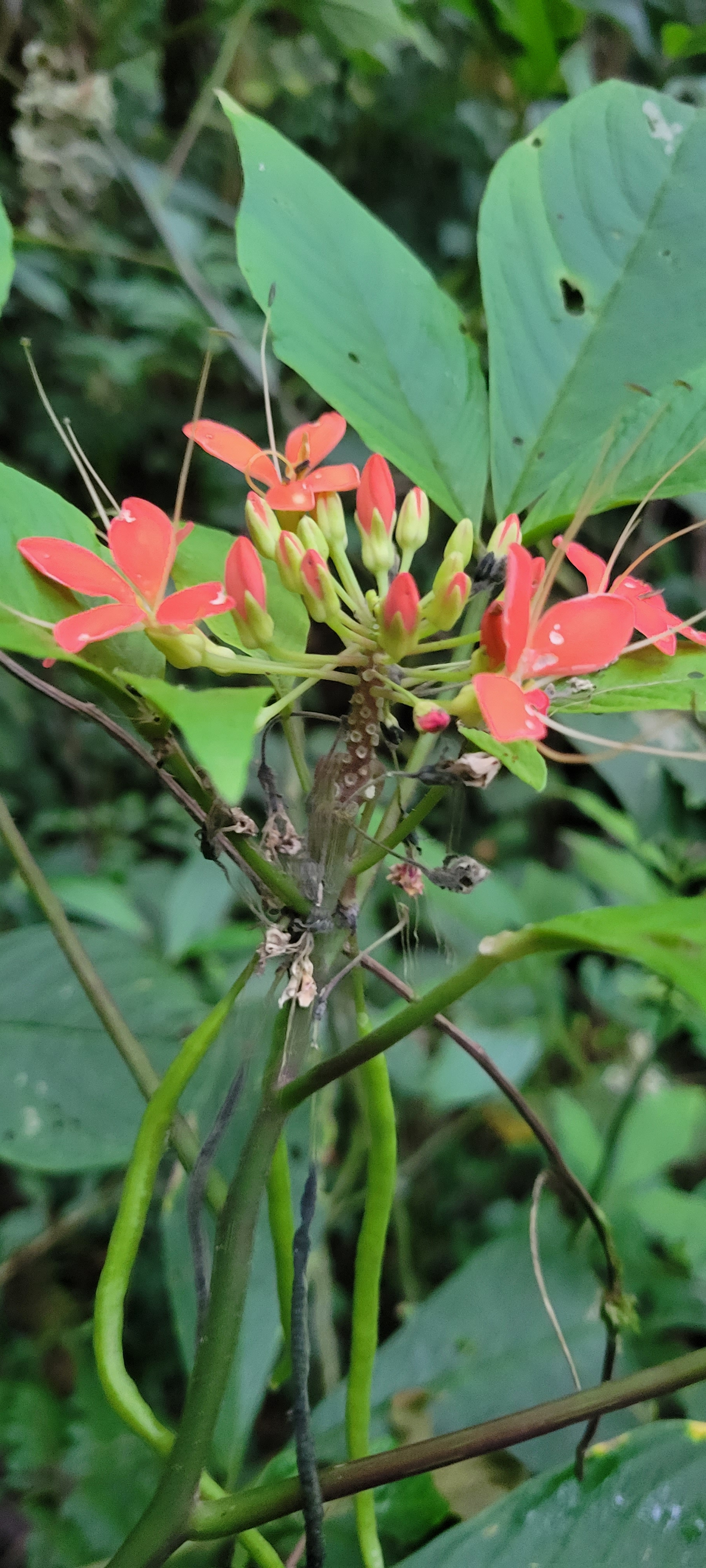

Scientific classification
- Kingdom: Plantae
- Clade: Tracheophytes
- Clade: Angiosperms
- Clade: Eudicots
- Clade: Rosids
- Order: Brassicales
- Family: Cleomaceae
- Genus: Podandrogyne
- Species: P. decipiens

Binomial name
- Podandrogyne decipiens (Triana & Planch.) Woodson

= Podandrogyne decipiens =

Species of flowering plants

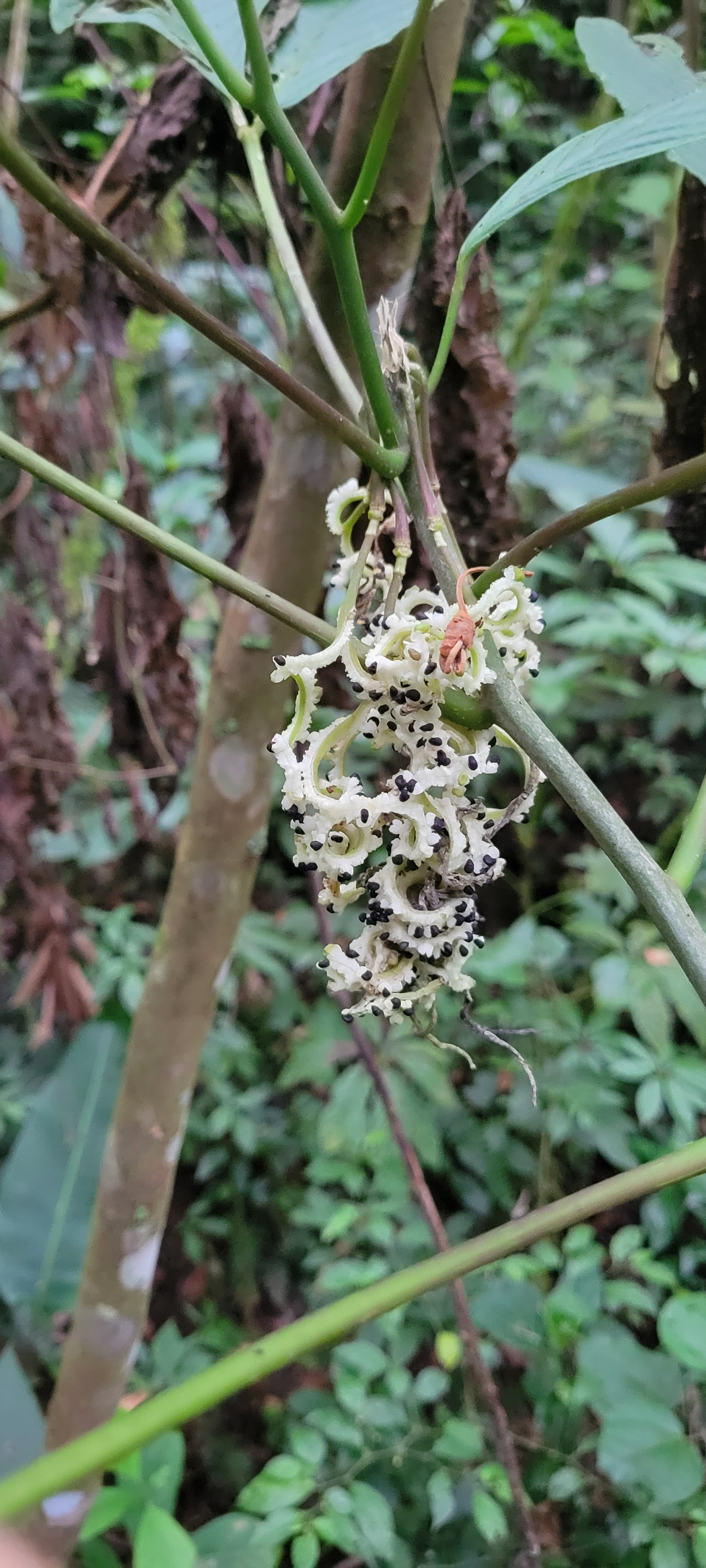
Dehisced Podandrogyne decipiens fruit

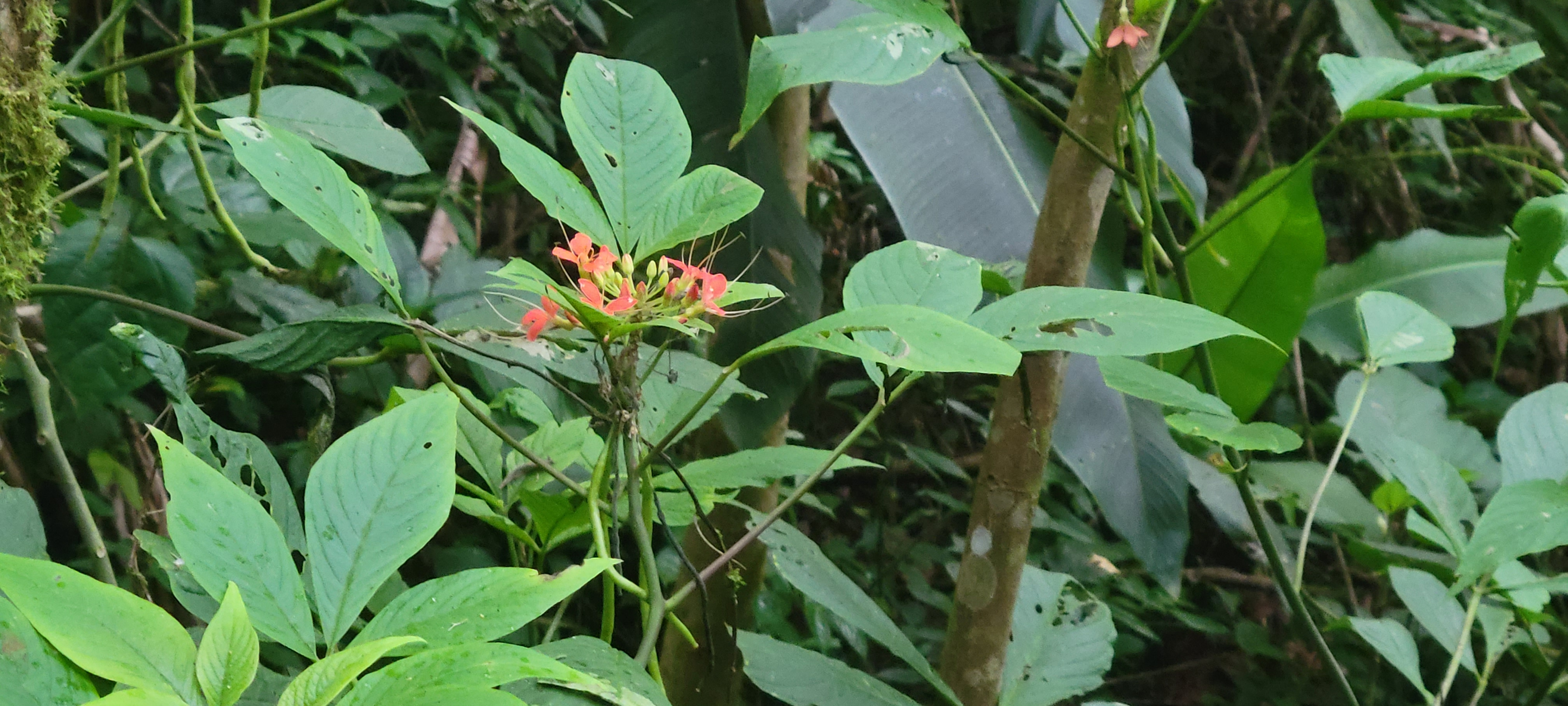

Podandrogyne decipiens is a species in the Podandrogyne genus in the family Clemoaceae.
