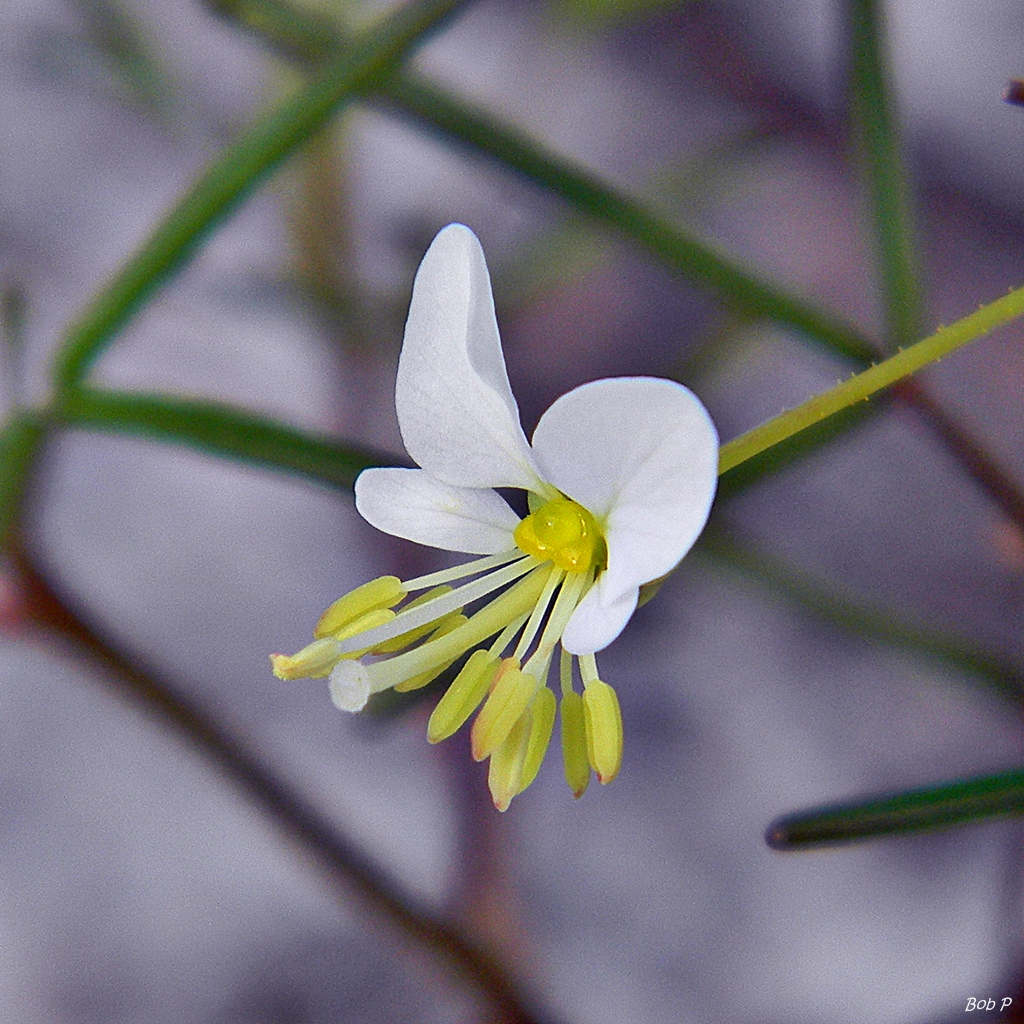

Scientific classification
- Kingdom: Plantae
- Clade: Tracheophytes
- Clade: Angiosperms
- Clade: Eudicots
- Clade: Rosids
- Order: Brassicales
- Family: Cleomaceae
- Genus: Polanisia
- Species: P. tenuifolia

Binomial name
- Polanisia tenuifolia Torr. & A.Gray

= Polanisia tenuifolia =

Species of flowering plant

Polansia tenuifolia is a species of flowering plant in the family Cleomaceae. It grows in Florida. It is known by the common names pineland catchfly and slender-leaf clammyweed (or slenderleaf clammyweed). It is synonymous with Aldenella tenuifolia, Cleome aldanella, Cleome tenuifolia, and Jacksonia tenuifolia. It is an annual.
