= Cleomella parviflora =

Conservation status
- Vulnerable (NatureServe)

Scientific classification
- Kingdom: Plantae
- Clade: Tracheophytes
- Clade: Angiosperms
- Clade: Eudicots
- Clade: Rosids
- Order: Brassicales
- Family: Cleomaceae
- Genus: Cleomella
- Species: C. parviflora

Binomial name
- Cleomella parviflora A.Gray

Species of flowering plant

Cleomella parviflora is a species of flowering plant in the cleome family known by the common name slender stinkweed. It is native to eastern California and western Nevada, where it grows in desert and sagebrush scrub in the Mojave Desert and southern parts of the Great Basin. It is an annual herb producing a smooth, hairless, reddish stem up to about 45 centimeters tall. There are a few leaves, each made up of three elongated, fleshy leaflets. Most of the flowers are located in a raceme at the tips of the stem branches, and there may be a few solitary flowers in the axils of the leaves. Each flower has four tiny pale yellow petals, each about 2 millimeters long. The fruit is a lobed, valved capsule which hangs on the tip of the remaining flower receptacle.
