= Cleomella sparsifolia =

Conservation status
- Vulnerable (NatureServe)

Scientific classification
- Kingdom: Plantae
- Clade: Tracheophytes
- Clade: Angiosperms
- Clade: Eudicots
- Clade: Rosids
- Order: Brassicales
- Family: Cleomaceae
- Genus: Cleomella
- Species: C. sparsifolia

Binomial name
- Cleomella sparsifolia (S.Watson) J.C.Hall & Roalson (2015)

Synonyms
- Carsonia sparsifolia (S.Watson) Greene (1900); Cleome sparsifolia S.Watson (1871)

Species of flowering plant

Cleomella sparsifolia is a species of flowering plant known by the common names fewleaf cleome and fewleaf spiderflower. This annual wildflower is native to California and Nevada where it grows in desert sand. This is an erect, branching plant not exceeding a meter in height. Its sparse leaves are each made up of 3 thick, oval-shaped leaflets. The bright yellow flowers have curving petals and long stamens tipped with knobby anthers. The fruit is a capsule up to 4 centimeters long.
