= Podandrogyne brevipedunculata =

Conservation status
- Endangered (IUCN 3.1)

Scientific classification
- Kingdom: Plantae
- Clade: Tracheophytes
- Clade: Angiosperms
- Clade: Eudicots
- Clade: Rosids
- Order: Brassicales
- Family: Cleomaceae
- Genus: Podandrogyne
- Species: P. brevipedunculata

Binomial name
- Podandrogyne brevipedunculata Cochrane

Species of flowering plant

Podandrogyne brevipedunculata is a species of plant in the Capparaceae family. It is endemic to Ecuador. Its natural habitats are subtropical or tropical moist lowland forests and subtropical or tropical moist montane forests. It is threatened by habitat loss.

Plant is 0.3–2 m tall, stems simple or few-branched, somewhat succulent. Leaves 3-5-foliolate; petioles 2–21 cm long, strong leaf veination. Green legume-like fruits that dehisce.
