= Podandrogyne jamesonii =

Conservation status
- Endangered (IUCN 3.1)

Scientific classification
- Kingdom: Plantae
- Clade: Tracheophytes
- Clade: Angiosperms
- Clade: Eudicots
- Clade: Rosids
- Order: Brassicales
- Family: Cleomaceae
- Genus: Podandrogyne
- Species: P. jamesonii

Binomial name
- Podandrogyne jamesonii (Briq.) Cochrane

Species of flowering plant

Podandrogyne jamesonii is a species of plant in the Capparaceae family. It is endemic to Ecuador. Small, bright red flowers. Its natural habitats are subtropical or tropical moist lowland forests and subtropical or tropical moist montane forests. It is threatened by habitat loss.
