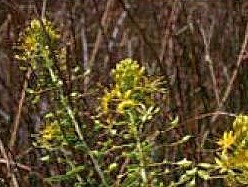

Scientific classification
- Kingdom: Plantae
- Clade: Tracheophytes
- Clade: Angiosperms
- Clade: Eudicots
- Clade: Rosids
- Order: Brassicales
- Family: Cleomaceae
- Genus: Cleomella
- Species: C. plocasperma

Binomial name
- Cleomella plocasperma S.Watson

= Cleomella plocasperma =

Species of flowering plant

Cleomella plocasperma is a species of flowering plant in the cleome family known by the common name twisted cleomella and alkali stinkweed. It is native to the Great Basin and Mojave Desert in the western United States, where it grows mainly in wet, alkaline soils such as those around hot springs. There is a disjunct population in the Bruneau Valley of southwestern Idaho. It grows with other halophytic species such as saltgrass and greasewood. This is an annual herb producing a smooth, hairless stem which divides into several erect or upright branches which may exceed half a meter tall. The sparse leaves are each split into three narrow leaflets. The flowers occur in a raceme at the top of each stem branch. Each flower has four yellow petals and several long stamens which may be over a centimeter long. The fruit is a capsule with large lobes. It hangs at the tip of the remaining flower receptacle.
