= Cleomella brevipes =

Conservation status
- Vulnerable (NatureServe)

Scientific classification
- Kingdom: Plantae
- Clade: Tracheophytes
- Clade: Angiosperms
- Clade: Eudicots
- Clade: Rosids
- Order: Brassicales
- Family: Cleomaceae
- Genus: Cleomella
- Species: C. brevipes

Binomial name
- Cleomella brevipes S.Watson

Species of flowering plant

Cleomella brevipes is a species of flowering plant in the cleome family known by the common name shortstalk stinkweed. It is native to the Mojave Desert and adjacent hills, where it grows in wet alkaline environments such as mineral-rich desert hot springs. It is an annual herb producing a rough, waxy, red stem up to about 45 centimeters tall. The stem is lined with many small fleshy leaves, each divided into three leaflets. Flowers appear in the leaf axils all along the stem, often all the way down to the base. Each grows at the end of a short, erect pedicel. The flower has four tiny yellow sepals and four tiny yellow petals. The fruit is a somewhat rounded, hanging capsule developing at the end of the remaining flower receptacle.
