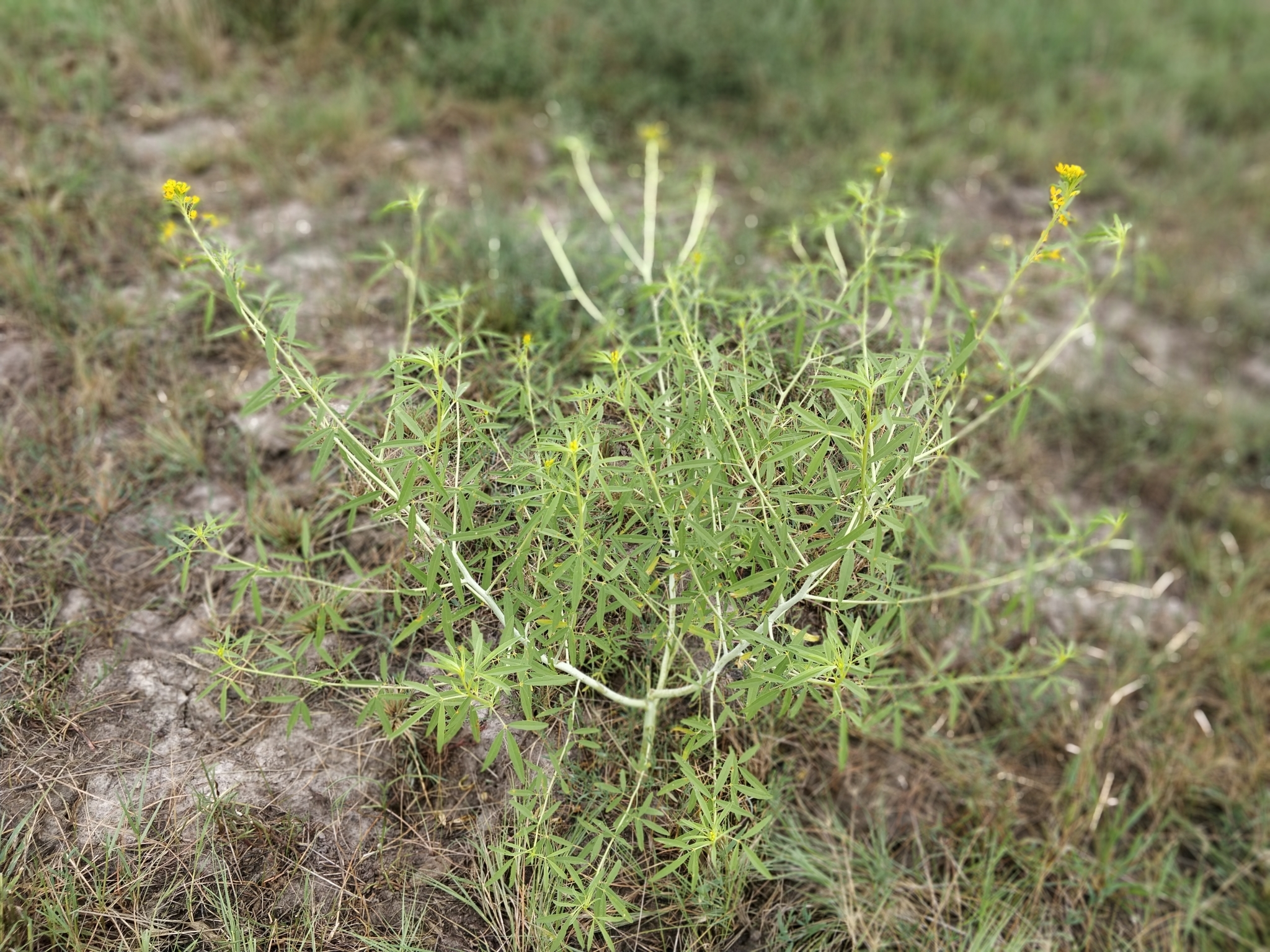

Conservation status
- Secure (NatureServe)

Scientific classification
- Kingdom: Plantae
- Clade: Tracheophytes
- Clade: Angiosperms
- Clade: Eudicots
- Clade: Rosids
- Order: Brassicales
- Family: Cleomaceae
- Genus: Cleomella
- Species: C. angustifolia

Binomial name
- Cleomella angustifolia Torr.

Synonyms
- Cleomella mexicana Torr. 1828, Illegitimate, non DC. 1824.

= Cleomella angustifolia =

Species of flowering plant

Cleomella angustifolia, the narrowleaf rhombopod, is a plant species native to the south-central United States. It grows in roadsides, grasslands, stream banks, and pond shores in Texas, Oklahoma, Kansas, Nebraska and Colorado.

Cleomella angustifolia is an herb up to 200 cm tall. Leaves are pinnately compound with 3–8 pairs of leaflets. Flowers are yellow-orange, up to 15 mm across. Capsules are rhomboidal, up to 12 mm across.
