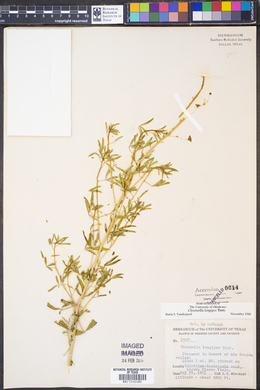

Conservation status
- Vulnerable (NatureServe)

Scientific classification
- Kingdom: Plantae
- Clade: Tracheophytes
- Clade: Angiosperms
- Clade: Eudicots
- Clade: Rosids
- Order: Brassicales
- Family: Cleomaceae
- Genus: Cleomella
- Species: C. longipes

Binomial name
- Cleomella longipes Torr.

= Cleomella longipes =

Species of flowering plant

Cleomella longipes, the Chiricahua Mountain stinkweed, is a plant species native to northern Mexico and to the southwestern United States. It has been reported from Chihuahua, San Luis Potosí, trans-Pecos Texas, New Mexico (Grant and Hidalgo Counties) Arizona (Cochise County). It is found on saline or alkaline flats at elevations of 500–1000 m.

== Description ==
Cleomella longipes is a sparsely-branched annual herb up to 80 cm tall. Leaves are narrowly elliptic, up to 5 cm long. Flowers are borne in racemes at the top of the plant and on the tips of branches. Sepals are green, petals yellow, up to 9 mm long and 4 mm wide. The bloom period is between the months of May and September. It is a smooth annual plant. The leaves shape is lanceolate, oblanceolate, or oblong. The leaves have a glabrous pubescent. The leaf apex is either acute or emarginate.
