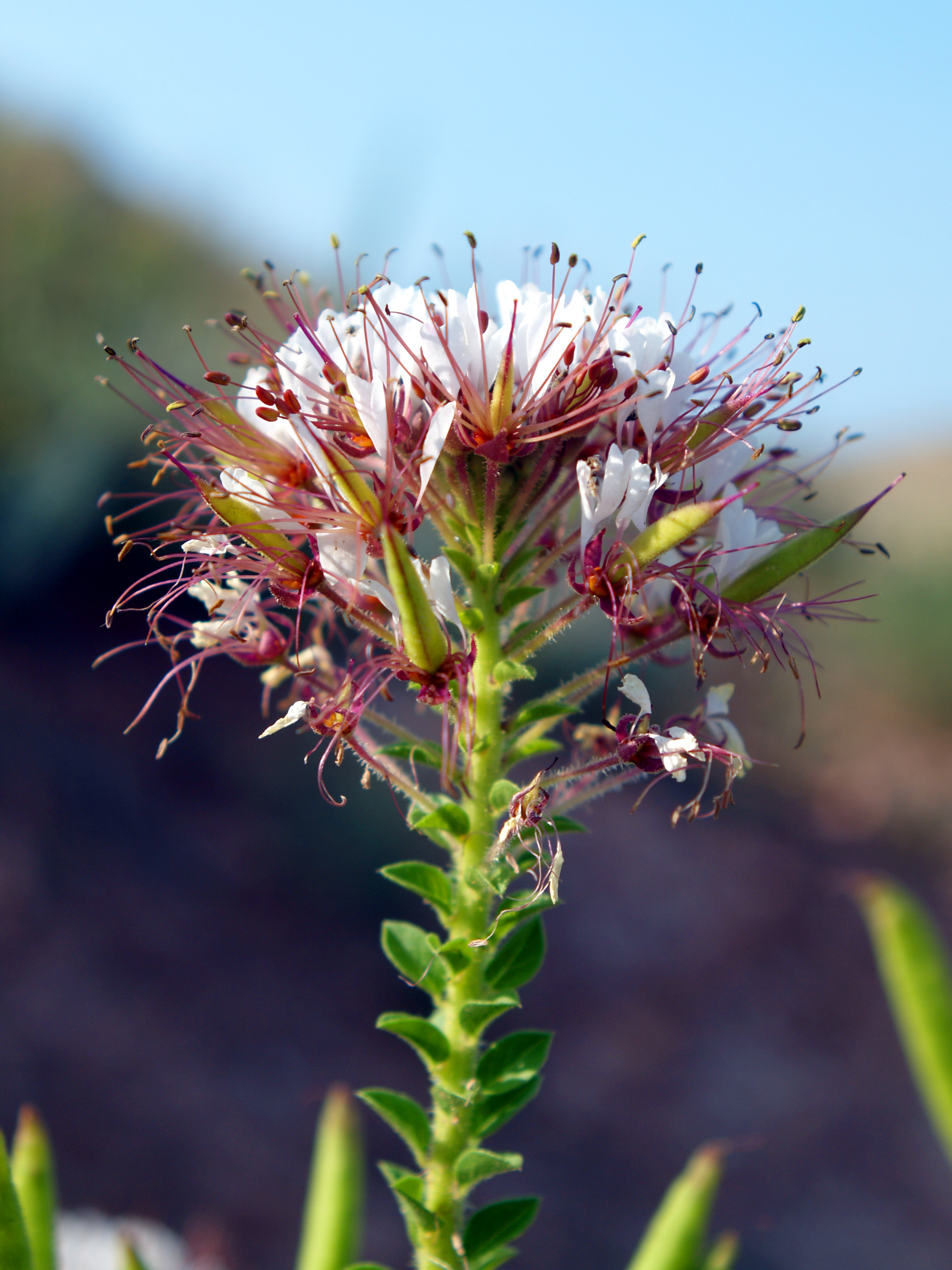

Conservation status
- Apparently Secure (NatureServe)

Scientific classification
- Kingdom: Plantae
- Clade: Tracheophytes
- Clade: Angiosperms
- Clade: Eudicots
- Clade: Rosids
- Order: Brassicales
- Family: Cleomaceae
- Genus: Polanisia
- Species: P. dodecandra

Binomial name
- Polanisia dodecandra (L.) DC.

= Polanisia dodecandra =

Species of flowering plant

Polanisia dodecandra is a species of flowering plant in the Cleomaceae family, known by the common name redwhisker clammyweed or clammyweed, and there are three subspecies of Polanisia. Usually annual, occasionally perennial, Polanisia is native to North America, and is found throughout much of Canada and the United States. It favors full sun, mesic to dry conditions, and barren, sandy or gravelly soils, even highly disturbed areas where there is little other ground vegetation. It looks similar to a close relative, the spider flower (Cleome).

The scientific name of the genus derives from the fact that the plant has numerous, long stamens of unequal lengths (from Greek polys, "many", and anisos, "unequal"). The name of the species, dodecandra means "having 12 stamens". The common name clammyweed refers to the sticky, or clammy, residue left on hands after handling the plant.

Polanisia grows from 30 to 91 cm (1 to 3 ft) tall and the vegetation and sap have a noticeable odor described as smelling unpleasant, sulphur-like, "strong and rank". The leaves, about 5.1 cm (2 in) long, are made up of three 2.5 centimetres (1 in) palmate leaflets. The stems are covered in glandular hairs, and numerous flowers are borne in terminal racemes (May–October). Each flower has four white or cream petals about 2.5 cm (1 in) long, and reddish purple stamens extend well beyond the petals (hence the "red whisker" clammyweed nomenclature). The seedpods are long, slender capsules 2.5–5.1 cm (1–2 in) long. They contain multiple small reddish brown seeds approx 2 mm (0.079 in). Polanisia seedpods project upward (whereas Cleome pods project out or down).

There are several subspecies of Polanisia dodecandra, including:

- Polanisia dodecandra subsp. dodecandra – redwhisker clammyweed
- P. dodecandra subsp. riograndensis – Rio Grande clammyweed (only found in Texas)
- P. dodecandra subsp. trachysperma – sandyseed clammyweed.

== Uses ==
The plant is related to the caper. There are culinary and ceremonial uses.
