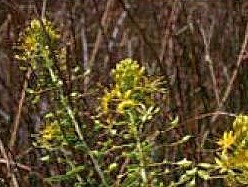
- Cleomella plocasperma (Bureau of Land Management photo)

Scientific classification
- Kingdom: Plantae
- Clade: Tracheophytes
- Clade: Angiosperms
- Clade: Eudicots
- Clade: Rosids
- Order: Brassicales
- Family: Cleomaceae
- Genus: Cleomella; DC.

Species
- 22; see text

Synonyms
- Isomeris Nutt. (1838); Isopara Raf. (1832); Oxystylis Torr. & Frém. (1845); Peritoma DC. (1824); Wislizenia Engelm. (1848)

= Cleomella =

Genus of flowering plants

Cleomella is a genus of flowering plants. It includes 22 species of native to North America, ranging from southern Mexico through the western and central United States to western and central Canada. Like their relatives, the cleomes, plants of this genus have traditionally been included in the caper family Capparaceae but have recently been moved into a new family, Cleomaceae. Cleomella are annual wildflowers native to the dry and desert regions of western North America. They are similar to cleomes in appearance. They are erect and branching with leaves divided into three leaflets and inflorescences of yellow flowers with long stamens. Cleomella species are known commonly as stinkweeds or simply cleomellas.

22 species are accepted.

- Cleomella angustifolia Torr. – narrowleaf rhombopod
- Cleomella arborea (Nutt.) Roalson & J.C.Hall – bladderpod
- Cleomella brevipes S.Watson – shortstalk stinkweed
- Cleomella californica (Greene) Roalson & J.C.Hall – San Joaquin Valley, California
- Cleomella hillmanii A.Nelson – Hillman's stinkweed
- Cleomella jaliscensis E.Villegas & R.Delgad.
- Cleomella jonesii (J.F.Macbr.) J.C.Hall & Roalson
- Cleomella longipes Torr. – Chiricahua Mountain stinkweed
- Cleomella lutea (Hook.) Roalson & J.C.Hall
- Cleomella macbrideana - MacBride cleomella
- Cleomella mexicana Moc. & Sessé ex DC.
- Cleomella multicaulis (DC.) J.C.Hall & Roalson
- Cleomella obtusifolia Torr. & Frém. – Mojave stinkweed
- Cleomella oxystyloides Roalson, J.C.Hall & Riser
- Cleomella palmeri (A.Gray) J.C.Hall & Roalson – Sonora, Baja California, and Baja California Sur, as well as from San Diego and Riverside Counties in California
- Cleomella palmeriana M.E.Jones – Rocky Mountain stinkweed
- Cleomella parviflora A.Gray – slender stinkweed
- Cleomella perennis Iltis
- Cleomella platycarpa (Torr.) Roalson & J.C.Hall
- Cleomella plocasperma S.Watson – twisted cleomella
- Cleomella refracta (Engelm.) J.C.Hall & Roalson – northern Mexico (Chihuahua and Sonora) and southwestern United States
- Cleomella serrulata (Pursh) Roalson & J.C.Hall
- Cleomella sparsifolia (S.Watson) J.C.Hall & Roalson
