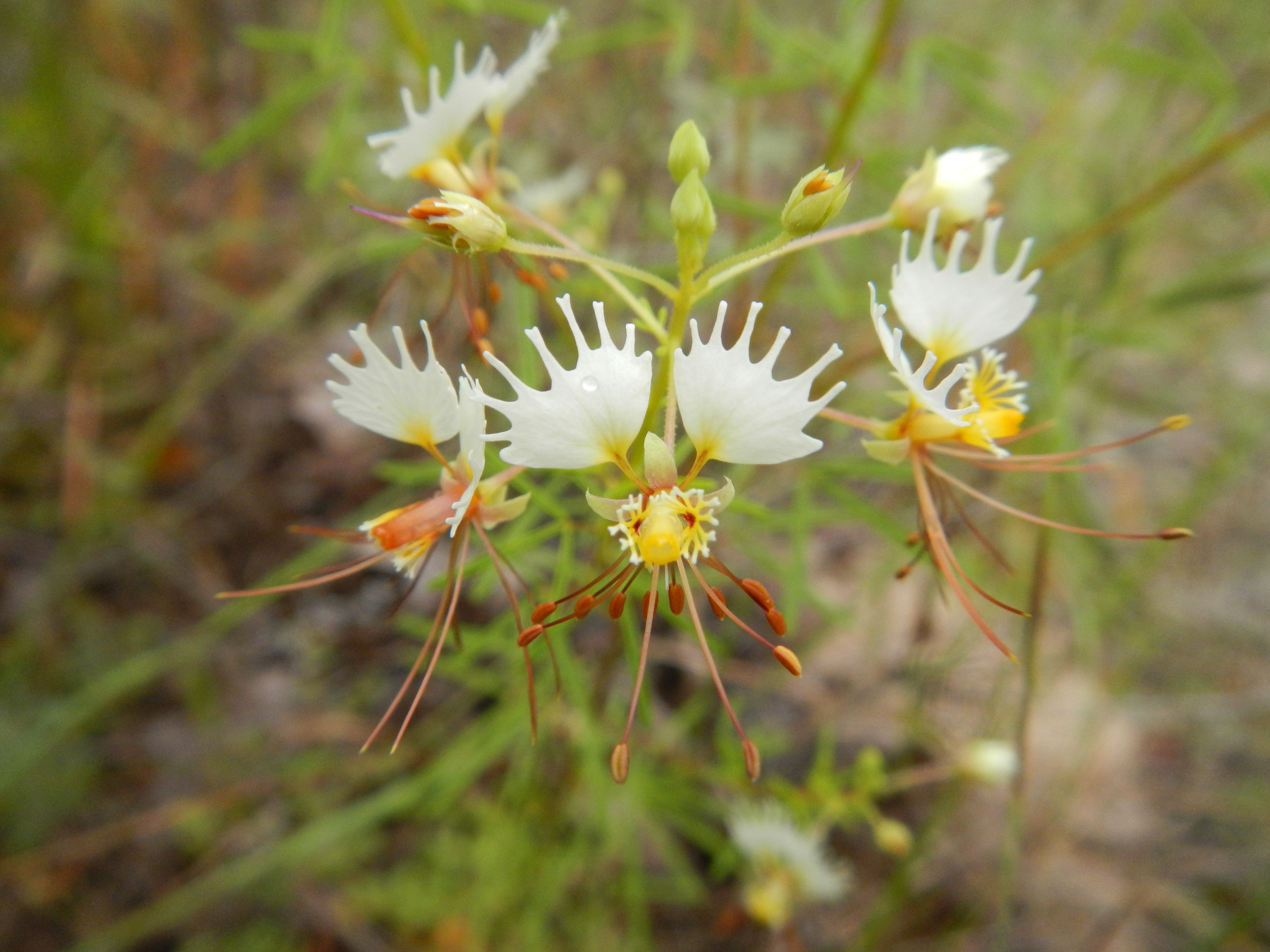

Scientific classification
- Kingdom: Plantae
- Clade: Tracheophytes
- Clade: Angiosperms
- Clade: Eudicots
- Clade: Rosids
- Order: Brassicales
- Family: Cleomaceae
- Genus: Polanisia
- Species: P. erosa

Binomial name
- Polanisia erosa (Nutt.) Iltis

Synonyms
- Cristatella erosa, Cleome erosa, Cyrbasium erosum

= Polanisia erosa =

Species of flowering plant

Polanisia erosa is a sticky, 10–60 cm (3.9–23.6 in) high annual herbaceous species of flowering plant in the Cleome family, Cleomaceae, known by the common named large clammyweed and sandhill clammyweed. It has narrow clover-like leaves, and cream-coloured, frilly flowers with a yellowish centre, looking a bit like a small butterfly or a set of elk antlers. It naturally occurs in dry and sandy habitats in Texas and adjacent parts of Arkansas, Louisiana and Oklahoma.

== Taxonomy ==
The American botanist Thomas Nuttall was the first to describe large clammyweed in 1834, which he placed in a new genus and named Cristatella erosa. Amos Eaton included the species in 1836 in the genus Cleome as C. erosa. In 1842, Stephan Endlicher, an Austrian botanist who was the director of the Vienna Botanical Garden moved the species to a new genus and renamed it to Cyrbasium erosum, which is an illegitimate name. In 1958 Hugh Iltis concluded the species could better be assigned to the genus Polanisia, a name that has priority over Cristatella, since it was already erected by Constantine Samuel Rafinesque in 1819, and made the new combination P. erosa. Iltis distinguished two subtaxa, the nominate and subspecies breviglandulosa.

== Description ==
Large clammyweed is a sticky, unscented annual herb of 10–60 cm (3.9–23.6 in). It has branched or unbranched, green or purple stems with seated glands and glandular hairs. The 0.3–1.5 mm (0.012–0.059 in) long, green or purple leaf stalks are often at an angle with the leaf blade. The leaf blade consists of three narrow, 0.9–3.5 cm (0.35–1.38 in) long and only 1–2 mm (0.039–0.079 in) wide, somewhat fleshy leaflets, the right and left halves more or less folded towards each other (or conduplicate) with entire margins, a needle-like tip, the underside of the leaf with many, and the upper side with few glands. The bilaterally symmetrical flowers are set in gland-covered racemes that are initially 1–3 cm (0.39–1.18 in) long but that keep growing to 6–8 cm (2.4–3.1 in) when fruits are ripe. Each individual flower is subtended by a bracts consisting of one or three entire bractlets, which have an oval shape and are 7–15 mm (0.28–0.59 in) long. The stalk of the individual flower is 1−2.3 cm (0.4-0.9 in) long. The four deciduous, eventually deflected, green to purple coloured, hairless sepals are lanceolate to inverted egg-shaped, 2.5–3.5 mm (0.1–0.14 in) long and 0.8–1.3 mm (0.03–0.05 in) wide, with entire margins and a pointy tip. The four petals are mostly creamy white, oblong-ovate, consist of a more yellowish straight and narrow claw and a wide plate. The forward directed lower (abaxial) pair is 3–5 mm (0.12–0.20 in) long and 2.5–3 mm (0.10-0.12 in) wide the upper 0.7 deeply incised to create nine or ten finger-like lobes, often themselves ones or even twice split into two lobes (also described as a lacerate margin). The upper (adaxial) pair is 6–11 mm (0.24–0.43 in) long and 3.5–5 mm (0.12-0.20 in) wide, less deeply incised with four to six finger-like lobes. The tube-shaped nectaries are yellow, but become purple when drying and are 1-5.5 mm (0.02–0.12 in) long. There are six to fifteen stamens that reach beyond the petals, consist of purple 1–1.3 cm (0.4-0.5 in) filaments topped by purple, 1–1.5 mm (0.04–0.06 in) long anthers, which do not coil when the pollen is released. The 5–8 mm (0.20–0.31 in) long ovary sits on the end of a gynophore that grows to a length of 3–14 mm (0.12–0.55 in) when the fruit is ripe, and is topped with a 2.5–4.5 mm (0.10–0.18 in) long style that persists and ends in a green stigma. The fruit is a capsule of 2–6 cm (0.79–2.36 in) long and 0.2–0.5 cm (0.1-0.2 in) in diameter, with a netted surface with or without some glandular hairs. Each capsule contains twelve to forty, globular to ovate, dark reddish brown seeds of 1.5–1.8 mm (0.06–0.07 in), with a nobbly surface.

=== Subspecies ===
Polanisia erosa subsp. erosa that grows in eastern Texas and adjacent Arkansas, Louisiana, Oklahoma has about 3 mm (0.12 in) long nectaries, a 7–14 mm (0.28–0.55 in) gynophore when the fruit is ripe, and the largest petals are 7–11 mm (0.28–0.43 in). In Polanisia erosa subsp. breviglandulosa from southernmost Texas however, those measuments are 1.5 mm (0.06 in) for the nectaries, 3–6 mm (0.12–0.24 in) for the gynophore and 6–9 mm (0.24–0.35 in) for the petals.

== Distribution and habitat ==
Large clammyweed naturally occurs in Texas and adjacent parts of Arkansas, Louisiana and Oklahoma, where it can be found in fields, prairies, sandy hillsides and open woodland.
