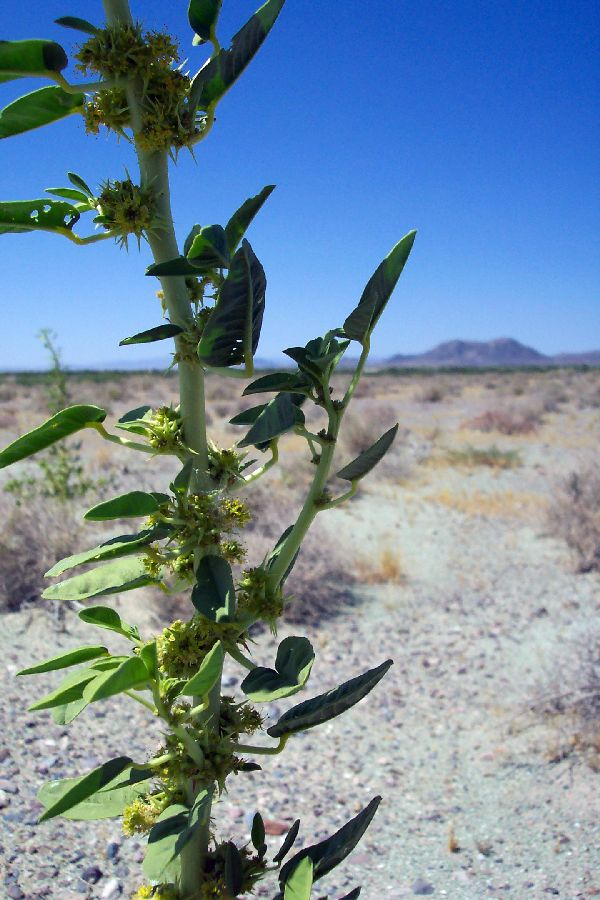

Scientific classification
- Kingdom: Plantae
- Clade: Tracheophytes
- Clade: Angiosperms
- Clade: Eudicots
- Clade: Rosids
- Order: Brassicales
- Family: Cleomaceae
- Genus: Cleomella
- Species: C. oxystyloides

Binomial name
- Cleomella oxystyloides Roalson, J.C.Hall & Riser (2015)

Synonyms
- Oxystylis lutea Torr. & Frém. (1845)

= Cleomella oxystyloides =

Genus of flowering plants

Cleomella oxystyloides is a species of flowering plants in the cleome family, Cleomaceae, which is known by the common name spiny caper. It is native to the Mojave Desert straddling the border between California and Nevada. It grows in rocky and sandy desert habitat, often on alkaline soils. This is an annual herb producing an erect, branching stem which may reach 1.5 meters in height. The leaf is made up of three thick, firm leaflets 2 to 6 centimeters long, borne on a stout, straight petiole. The inflorescence is a dense head of flowers clustered about the stem at the leaf axils, each flower with four small yellow petals. The fruit is a small white or purple nutlet bearing the spine-like remnant of the flower receptacle.

The plant was first described as Oxystylis lutea in 1845, and placed in the monotypic genus Oxystylis. It was renamed Cleomella oxystyloides in 2015, and placed in the genus Cleomella.
