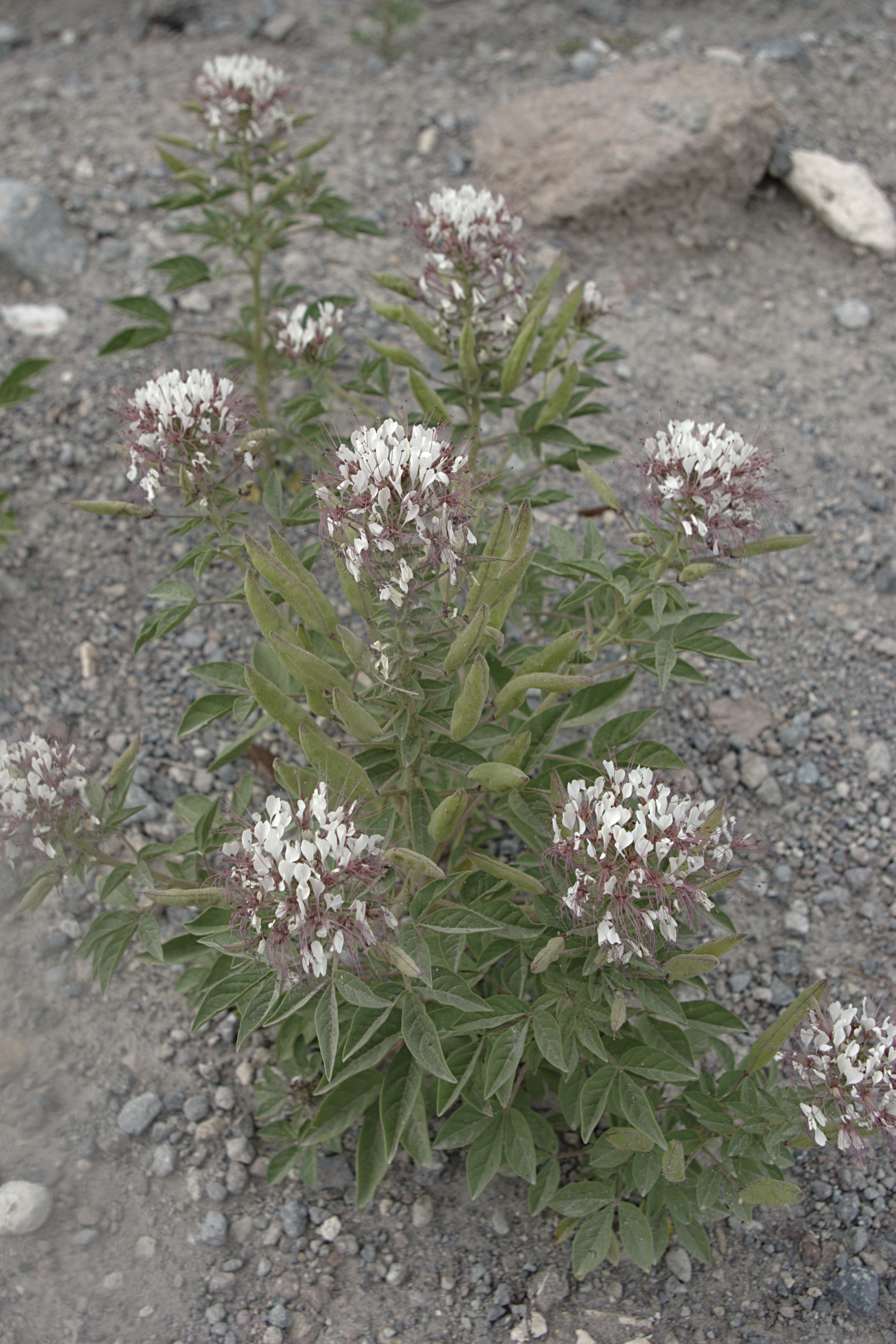
- Polanisia dodecandra

Scientific classification
- Kingdom: Plantae
- Clade: Tracheophytes
- Clade: Angiosperms
- Clade: Eudicots
- Clade: Rosids
- Order: Brassicales
- Family: Cleomaceae
- Genus: Polanisia; Raf.

Species
- Polanisia dodecandra Polanisia erosa Polanisia jamesii Polanisia tenuifolia Polanisia uniglandulosa

Synonyms
- Cristatella Nutt.

= Polanisia =

Genus of flowering plants

Polanisia is a genus of flowering plants in the family Cleomaceae. Members of the genus are commonly known as clammyweeds. Polanisia jamesii is listed as locally endangered in Minnesota, while P. dodecandra is widespread through much of North America.

== Species ==
Five species are currently recognized in the genus:

- Polanisia dodecandra (L.) DC. – redwhisker clammyweed
  - Polanisia dodecandra subsp. dodecandra
  - Polanisia dodecandra subsp. riograndensis H.H.Iltis
  - Polanisia dodecandra subsp. trachysperma (Torr. & A.Gray) H.H.Iltis
- Polanisia erosa (Nutt.) H.H.Iltis – large clammyweed
- Polanisia jamesii (Torr. & A.Gray) H.H.Iltis – James' clammyweed
- Polanisia tenuifolia Torr. & A.Gray – slenderleaf clammyweed
- Polanisia uniglandulosa (Cav.) DC. – Mexican clammyweed

=== Formerly placed here ===
- Arivela viscosa (L.) Raf. (as P. viscosa (L.) DC.)
