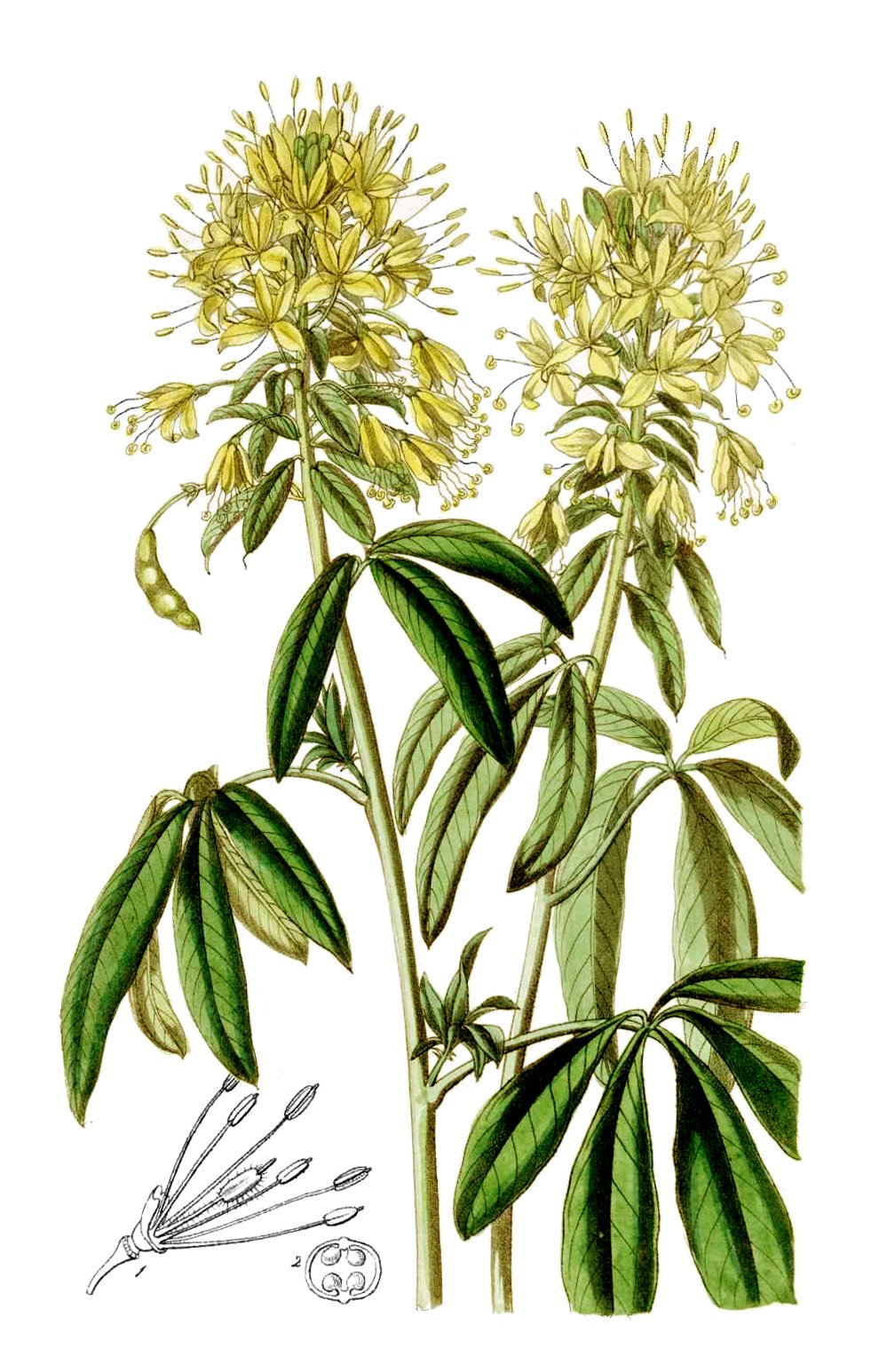

Conservation status
- Secure (NatureServe)

Scientific classification
- Kingdom: Plantae
- Clade: Tracheophytes
- Clade: Angiosperms
- Clade: Eudicots
- Clade: Rosids
- Order: Brassicales
- Family: Cleomaceae
- Genus: Cleomella
- Species: C. lutea

Binomial name
- Cleomella lutea Hook. Roalson & J.C.Hall (2015)

Synonyms
- Cleome aurea (Nutt.) Nutt. (1838); Cleome breviflora (Wooton & Standl.) Pax & K.Hoffm. (1936); Cleome lutea Hook. (1830); Isexina aurea (Nutt.) Raf. (1838); Peritoma aurea Nutt. (1834); Peritoma breviflora Wooton & Standl. (1913); Peritoma lutea (Hook.) Raf. (1838)

= Cleomella lutea =

Species of flowering plant

Cleomella lutea is a species of flowering plant known by the common names yellow bee plant and yellow spiderflower. This annual wildflower is native to the western United States where it is most common in desert scrub and plateau habitats. It is a sprawling plant often exceeding 1 metre (3 feet) in height. The erect stem can be branched and has widely spaced leaves all the way along, each leaf made up of three to five leaflets, which are smaller closer to the top of the plant. Atop the stem is a showy inflorescence of many bright yellow flowers. Each flower has four narrow sepals and four oblong petals around a cluster of six long stamens tipped with knobby anthers. As the inflorescence lengthens at the top of the stem, flowers that have opened and been pollinated drop their petals and the ovary develops into a fruit. The fruits are capsules several centimeters long containing large seeds; these develop at the base of the inflorescence and hang on pedicels. A flowering plant may have blooming flowers at the top of the stem and ripening capsules dangling off the stem further down.

Some Plateau Indian tribes drank an infusion from the branch and flowers of the yellow bee plant as a treatment for the common cold.
