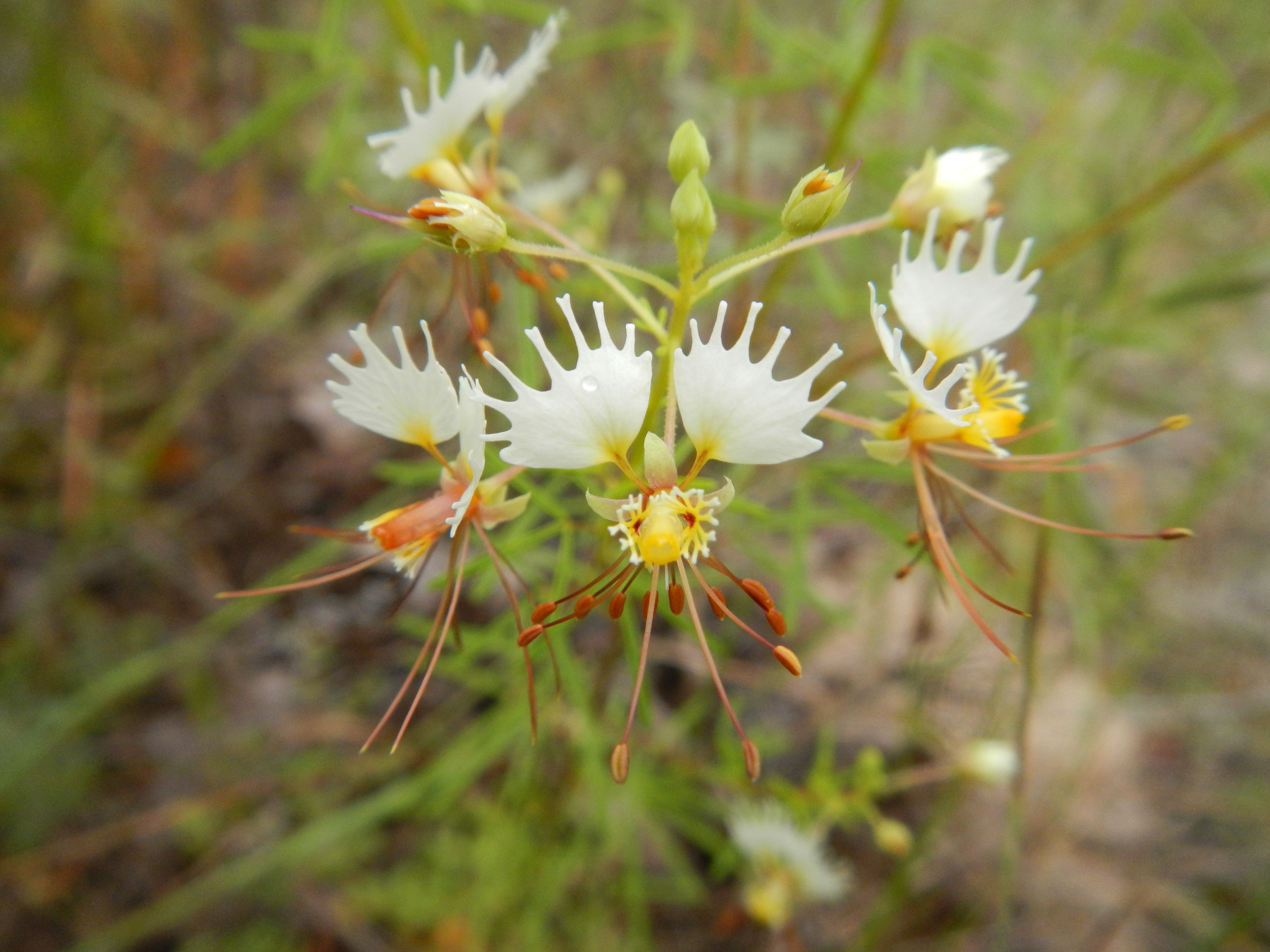
- Polanisia erosa

Scientific classification
- Kingdom: Plantae
- Clade: Tracheophytes
- Clade: Angiosperms
- Clade: Eudicots
- Clade: Rosids
- Order: Brassicales
- Family: Cleomaceae; Bercht. & J.Presl

Genera
- Cleome L.; Cleomella DC.; Polanisia Raf.

= Cleomaceae =

Family of flowering plants

The Cleomaceae are a small family of flowering plants in the order Brassicales, comprising about 220 species in three genera, Cleome, Cleomella, and Polanisia. These genera were previously included in the family Capparaceae, but were raised to a distinct family when DNA evidence suggested the genera included in it are more closely related to the Brassicaceae than they are to the Capparaceae. The APG II system allows for Cleomaceae to be included in Brassicaceae. Cleomaceae includes C_{3}, C_{3}–C_{4}, and C_{4} photosynthesis species.

== Taxonomy ==
In 1994, a group of scientists including Walter Stephen Judd suggested to merge the Capparaceae (which at that time included the Cleomaceae) with the Brassicaceae. Early DNA-analysis showed that the Capparaceae - as defined at that moment - were paraphyletic, and others suggested to assign the genera closest to the Brassicaceae to the Cleomaceae. The Cleomaceae and Brassicaceae diverged approximately 41 million years ago. All three families have consistently been placed in one order (variably called Capparales or Brassicales). The APG II system merged Cleomaceae and Brassicaceae. Other classifications have continued to recognise the Capparaceae, but with a more restricted circumscription, either including Cleome and its relatives in the Brassicaceae or recognizing them in the segregate family Cleomaceae. The APG III system has recently adopted this last solution, but this may change as a consensus arises on this point. Current insights in the relationships of the Brassicaceae, based on a 2012 DNA-analysis, are summarized in the following tree.

- core Brassicales
  - - - - - family Resedaceae
        - family Gyrostemonaceae
      - family Pentadiplandraceae
    - - family Tovariaceae
      - - family Capparaceae
        - - family Cleomaceae
          - family Brassicaceae
  - family Emblingiaceae

=== Subdivisions ===
Three genera are currently accepted, Polanisia with 5 species, Cleome with 199 species, and Cleomella with 22 species. Plants of the World Online considers Oxystylis, Peritoma, and Wislizenia synonyms of Cleomella.

== Description ==
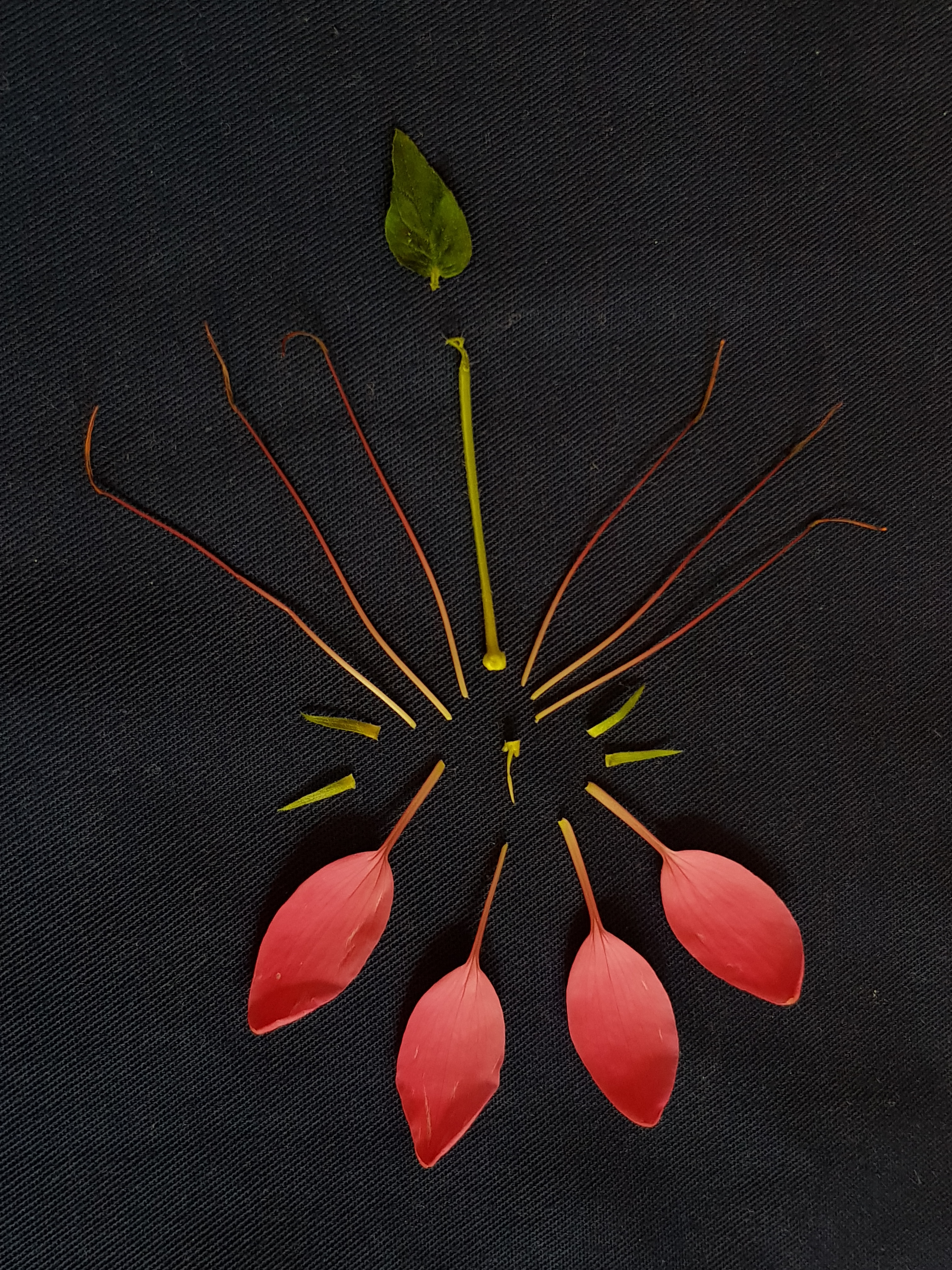
Floral diagram of Cleome hassleriana

Cleomaceae are mostly annual, sometimes perennial herbaceous plants, seldom shrubs or small trees, and some are lianas. Most of them have glands, a character setting them apart from the related Capparaceae, and contain resins, and may have an aromatic or foetid smell. The alternately set leaves, have stalks and never form a sheath around the stem. The leaves are always palmately compound, mostly with three to seven leaflets, rarely with just one leaflet. At the base of the leafstalk sit scaly, leafy or spiny stipules, a difference with its sister group Brassicaceae that consistently lack stipules, although a pair of glands can sometimes be present at the base of the leaf stalk. Hairs and papillae may be present.

The flowers of Cleomaceae are somewhat to strongly bilateral symmetric. There are mostly four, sometimes two or six, free or merged sepals, that may be shed quickly or remain, are overlapping in the bud or are already separate. The corolla consists of mostly four, sometimes two or six petals that have distinctive claws and limbs, free or with merged limbs. The stamens may be placed on the level of insertion of the perianth or on a stalk, raising the bases of the stamens above the perianth. This occurs for instance in Gynandropsis gynandra. There are four simple stamens or branched in four groups of up to 12 stamens each that have a common base, and are free from the petals. When there are groups of stamens, the anthers mature from the middle outwards. The base of the stamens may or may not be fused with the female parts in the centre of the flower. The filaments may be of equal length or strongly differ, and all may carry anthers, but infertile staminodes may also occur. The anther releases the pollen through slits stretching along its length. The ovary is positioned above the perianth and the androecium (a so-called superior ovary), consists of two fully merged carpels, and contains one cavity that may be divided in two by a partition (or replum). Between ten and fifty ovules (future seeds) are set along the margins of each of the carpels. As the fruit ripens, a stalk (or gynophore) develops. The dry fruit opens with two valves. When the fruit has a replum, it has the same basic morphology as the Brassicaceae (called silicula or siliqua), and this sets it apart from the Capparaceae, that have a capsule.
