= List of Brassicales of South Africa =

Flowering plants in the order Brassicales recorded from South Africa

The Brassicales (or Cruciales) are an order of flowering plants (anthophytes), belonging to the eurosids II group of dicotyledons under the APG II system. One character common to many members of the order is the production of glucosinolate (mustard oil) compounds. Most systems of classification have included this order, although sometimes under the name Capparales (the name chosen depending on which is thought to have priority).

The anthophytes are a grouping of plant taxa bearing flower-like reproductive structures. They were formerly thought to be a clade comprising plants bearing flower-like structures. The group contained the angiosperms - the extant flowering plants, such as roses and grasses - as well as the Gnetales and the extinct Bennettitales.

23,420 species of vascular plant have been recorded in South Africa, making it the sixth most species-rich country in the world and the most species-rich country on the African continent. Of these, 153 species are considered to be threatened. Nine biomes have been described in South Africa: Fynbos, Succulent Karoo, desert, Nama Karoo, grassland, savanna, Albany thickets, the Indian Ocean coastal belt, and forests.

The 2018 South African National Biodiversity Institute's National Biodiversity Assessment plant checklist lists 35,130 taxa in the phyla Anthocerotophyta (hornworts (6)), Anthophyta (flowering plants (33534)), Bryophyta (mosses (685)), Cycadophyta (cycads (42)), Lycopodiophyta (Lycophytes(45)), Marchantiophyta (liverworts (376)), Pinophyta (conifers (33)), and Pteridophyta (cryptogams (408)).

Six families are represented in the literature. Listed taxa include species, subspecies, varieties, and forms as recorded, some of which have subsequently been allocated to other taxa as synonyms, in which cases the accepted taxon is appended to the listing. Multiple entries under alternative names reflect taxonomic revision over time.

== Brassicaceae ==
Family: Brassicaceae,

=== Alyssum ===
Genus Alyssum:

- Alyssum minutum Schltdl. ex DC. not indigenous, naturalised

=== Aplanodes ===
Genus Aplanodes:

- Aplanodes doidgeana Marais, endemic
- Aplanodes sisymbrioides (Schltr.) Marais, indigenous

=== Arabidopsis ===
Genus Arabidopsis:

- Arabidopsis thaliana (L.) Heynh. not indigenous, naturalised

=== Barbarea ===
Genus Barbarea:

- Barbarea verna (Mill.) Asch. not indigenous, naturalised

=== Brachycarpaea ===
Genus Brachycarpaea:

- Brachycarpaea juncea (P.J.Bergius) Marais, accepted as Heliophila juncea (P.J.Bergius) Druce, endemic

=== Brassica ===
Genus Brassica:

- Brassica elongata Ehrh. subsp, elongata, not indigenous, naturalised
- Brassica juncea (L.) Czern. & Coss. not indigenous, naturalised
- Brassica nigra (L.) W.D.J.Koch, not indigenous, naturalised
- Brassica rapa L. not indigenous, naturalised
- Brassica tournefortii Gouan, not indigenous, naturalised, invasive

=== Camelina ===
Genus Camelina:

- Camelina rumelica Velen. not indigenous, naturalised

=== Capsella ===
Genus Capsella:

- Capsella bursa-pastoris (L.) Medik. not indigenous, naturalised

=== Cardamine ===
Genus Cardamine:

- Cardamine africana L. indigenous
- Cardamine flexuosa With. not indigenous, naturalised
- Cardamine hirsuta L. not indigenous, naturalised
- Cardamine impatiens L. not indigenous, naturalised
- Cardamine trichocarpa Hochst. ex A.Rich. indigenous
  - Cardamine trichocarpa Hochst. ex A.Rich. subsp, trichocarpa, endemic

=== Cardaria ===
Genus Cardaria:

- Cardaria draba (L.) Desv. accepted as Lepidium draba L. not indigenous, naturalised

=== Chamira ===
Genus Chamira:

- Chamira circaeoides (L.f.) Zahlbr. endemic

=== Cheiranthus ===
Genus Cheiranthus:

- Cheiranthus linearis Thunb. accepted as Heliophila linearis DC. var, linearis, indigenous

=== Coronopus ===
Genus Coronopus:

- Coronopus didymus (L.) Sm. not indigenous, naturalised
- Coronopus integrifolius (DC.) Spreng. not indigenous, naturalised
- Lepidium coronopus (L.) Al-Shehbaz (formerly Coronopus squamatus (Forssk.) Asch.) not indigenous, naturalised

=== Crambe ===
Genus Crambe:

- Crambe hispanica L. not indigenous, naturalised

=== Cycloptychis ===
Genus Cycloptychis:

- Cycloptychis marlothii O.E.Schulz, accepted as Heliophila hurkana Al-Shehbaz & Mumm. endemic
- Cycloptychis virgata (Thunb.) E.Mey. ex Sond. accepted as Heliophila maraisiana Al-Shehbaz & Mumm. endemic

=== Descurainia ===
Genus Descurainia:

- Descurainia sophia (L.) Webb ex Prantl, not indigenous, naturalised

=== Diplotaxis ===
Genus Diplotaxis:

- Diplotaxis muralis (L.) DC. not indigenous, naturalised
  - Diplotaxis muralis (L.) DC. subsp, muralis, not indigenous, naturalised

=== Eruca ===
Genus Eruca:

- Eruca sativa Mill. not indigenous, naturalised

=== Erucastrum ===
Genus Erucastrum:

- Erucastrum austroafricanum Al-Shehbaz & Warwick, indigenous
- Erucastrum griquense (N.E.Br.) O.E.Schulz, indigenous
- Erucastrum strigosum (Thunb.) O.E.Schulz, indigenous

=== Heliophila ===
Genus Heliophila:

- Heliophila acuminata (Eckl. & Zeyh.) Steud. endemic
- Heliophila adpressa O.E.Schulz, endemic
- Heliophila affinis Sond. endemic
- Heliophila africana (L.) Marais, endemic
- Heliophila alpina Marais, indigenous
- Heliophila amplexicaulis L.f. endemic
- Heliophila arenaria Sond. indigenous
  - Heliophila arenaria Sond. var, acocksii Marais, endemic
  - Heliophila arenaria Sond. var, agtertuinensis (O.E.Schulz) Marais, endemic
  - Heliophila arenaria Sond. var, arenaria, endemic
  - Heliophila arenaria Sond. var, glabrescens (O.E.Schulz) Marais, endemic
- Heliophila arenosa Schltr. endemic
- Heliophila brachycarpa Meisn. endemic
- Heliophila brassicifolia Eckl. & Zeyh. endemic
- Heliophila bulbostyla P.E.Barnes, endemic
- Heliophila callosa (L.f.) DC. endemic
- Heliophila carnosa (Thunb.) Steud. indigenous
- Heliophila cedarbergensis Marais, endemic
- Heliophila cinerea Marais, endemic
- Heliophila collina O.E.Schulz, endemic
- Heliophila concatenata Sond. endemic
- Heliophila cornellsbergia B.J.Pienaar & Nicholas, endemic
- Heliophila cornuta Sond. indigenous
  - Heliophila cornuta Sond. var, cornuta, indigenous
  - Heliophila cornuta Sond. var, squamata (Schltr.) Marais, indigenous
- Heliophila coronopifolia L. indigenous
- Heliophila crithmifolia Willd. indigenous
- Heliophila cuneata Marais, endemic
- Heliophila descurva Schltr. endemic
- Heliophila deserticola Schltr. var, deserticola, indigenous
  - Heliophila deserticola Schltr. var, micrantha A.Schreib. indigenous
- Heliophila diffusa (Thunb.) DC. indigenous
  - Heliophila diffusa (Thunb.) DC. var, diffusa, endemic
  - Heliophila diffusa (Thunb.) DC. var, flacca (Sond.) Marais, endemic
- Heliophila digitata L.f. endemic
- Heliophila dregeana Sond. endemic
- Heliophila elata Sond. indigenous
  - Heliophila elata Sond. var, elata, endemic
  - Heliophila elata Sond. var, pillansii Marais, endemic
- Heliophila elongata (Thunb.) DC. endemic
- Heliophila ephemera P.A.Bean, endemic
- Heliophila esterhuyseniae Marais, endemic
- Heliophila eximia Marais, indigenous
- Heliophila filicaulis Marais, endemic
- Heliophila formosa Hilliard & B.L.Burtt, indigenous
- Heliophila gariepina Schltr. endemic
- Heliophila glauca Burch. ex DC. endemic
- Heliophila hurkana Al-Shehbaz & Mumm. endemic
- Heliophila juncea (P.J.Bergius) Druce, endemic
- Heliophila katbergensis Marais, endemic
- Heliophila laciniata Marais, endemic
- Heliophila lactea Schltr. indigenous
- Heliophila latisiliqua E.Mey. ex Sond. var, latisiliqua, accepted as Heliophila thunbergii (Eckl. & Zeyh.) Steud. var, thunbergii, present
  - Heliophila latisiliqua E.Mey. ex Sond. var, macrostylis (E.Mey. ex Sond.) Marais, accepted as Heliophila thunbergii (Eckl. & Zeyh.) Steud. var, macrostylis (E.Mey. ex Sond.) B.Nord. present
- Heliophila leptophylla Schltr. endemic
- Heliophila linearifolia Burch. ex DC. var, filifolia Sond. accepted as Heliophila coronopifolia L.
- Heliophila linearis DC. endemic
  - Heliophila linearis DC. var, linearifolia (Burch. ex DC.) Marais, endemic
  - Heliophila linearis DC. var, linearis, endemic
  - Heliophila linearis DC. var, reticulata (Eckl. & Zeyh.) Marais, endemic
- Heliophila linoides Schltr. endemic
- Heliophila macowaniana Schltr. endemic
- Heliophila macra Schltr. endemic
- Heliophila macrosperma Burch. ex DC. endemic
- Heliophila maraisiana Al-Shehbaz & Mumm. endemic
- Heliophila meyeri Sond. indigenous
  - Heliophila meyeri Sond. var, meyeri, endemic
  - Heliophila meyeri Sond. var, minor Marais, endemic
- Heliophila minima (Stephens) Marais, indigenous
- Heliophila monosperma Al-Shehbaz & Mumm. endemic
- Heliophila namaquana Bolus, endemic
- Heliophila namaquensis (Marais) Al-Shehbaz & Mumm. endemic
- Heliophila nubigena Schltr. endemic
- Heliophila patens Oliv. endemic
- Heliophila pectinata Burch. ex DC. endemic
- Heliophila pendula Willd. endemic
- Heliophila pinnata L.f. endemic
- Heliophila promontorii Marais, endemic
- Heliophila pubescens Burch. ex Sond. endemic
- Heliophila pusilla L.f. indigenous
  - Heliophila pusilla L.f. var, lanceolata (Adamson) Marais, endemic
  - Heliophila pusilla L.f. var, macrosperma Marais, endemic
  - Heliophila pusilla L.f. var, pusilla, endemic
  - Heliophila pusilla L.f. var, setacea (Schltr.) Marais, endemic
- Heliophila ramosissima O.E.Schulz, endemic
- Heliophila refracta Sond. endemic
- Heliophila remotiflora O.E.Schulz, endemic
- Heliophila rigidiuscula Sond. indigenous
- Heliophila rimicola Marais, endemic
- Heliophila scandens Harv. endemic
- Heliophila schulzii Marais, endemic
- Heliophila scoparia Burch. ex DC. indigenous
  - Heliophila scoparia Burch. ex DC. var, aspera (Schltr.) Marais, endemic
  - Heliophila scoparia Burch. ex DC. var, scoparia, endemic
- Heliophila seselifolia Burch. ex DC. indigenous
  - Heliophila seselifolia Burch. ex DC. var, marlothii (O.E.Schulz) Marais, endemic
  - Heliophila seselifolia Burch. ex DC. var, nigellifolia (Schltr.) Marais, endemic
  - Heliophila seselifolia Burch. ex DC. var, seselifolia, indigenous
- Heliophila suavissima Burch. ex DC. indigenous
- Heliophila suborbicularis Al-Shehbaz & Mumm. endemic
- Heliophila subulata Burch. ex DC. endemic
- Heliophila tabularis Wolley-Dod, endemic
- Heliophila thunbergii (Eckl. & Zeyh.) Steud. indigenous
  - Heliophila thunbergii (Eckl. & Zeyh.) Steud. var, macrostylis (E.Mey. ex Sond.) B.Nord. endemic
  - Heliophila thunbergii (Eckl. & Zeyh.) Steud. var, thunbergii, endemic
- Heliophila tricuspidata Schltr. endemic
- Heliophila trifurca Burch. ex DC. indigenous
- Heliophila tulbaghensis Schinz, endemic
- Heliophila variabilis Burch. ex DC. indigenous

=== Hirschfeldia ===
Genus Hirschfeldia:

- Hirschfeldia incana (L.) Lagr.-Foss. not indigenous, naturalised

=== Hymenolobus ===
Genus Hymenolobus:

- Hymenolobus procumbens (L.) Nutt. in Torr. & A.Gray, not indigenous, naturalised

=== Lepidium ===
Genus Lepidium:

- Lepidium africanum (Burm.f.) DC. indigenous
  - Lepidium africanum (Burm.f.) DC. subsp, africanum, indigenous
  - Lepidium africanum (Burm.f.) DC. subsp, divaricatum (Aiton) Jonsell, indigenous
- Lepidium basuticum Marais, indigenous
- Lepidium bipinnatum Thunb. endemic
- Lepidium bonariense L. not indigenous, naturalised
- Lepidium campestre R.Br. not indigenous, naturalised
- Lepidium capense Thunb. endemic
- Lepidium desertorum Eckl. & Zeyh. indigenous
- Lepidium draba L. not indigenous, naturalised, invasive
- Lepidium ecklonii Schrad. endemic
- Lepidium flexuosum Thunb. endemic
- Lepidium mossii Thell. endemic
- Lepidium myriocarpum Sond. indigenous
- Lepidium pinnatum Thunb. endemic
- Lepidium schinzii Thell. indigenous
- Lepidium schlechteri Thell. endemic
- Lepidium suluense Marais, indigenous
- Lepidium transvaalense Marais, indigenous
- Lepidium trifurcum Sond. indigenous
- Lepidium virginicum L. not indigenous, naturalised

=== Lobularia ===
Genus Lobularia:

- Lobularia maritima (L.) Desv. not indigenous, naturalised

=== Matthiola ===
Genus Matthiola:

- Matthiola bicornis (Sibth. & Sm.) DC. not indigenous, naturalised
- Matthiola incana (L.) R.Br. not indigenous, naturalised
- Matthiola torulosa (Thunb.) DC. indigenous

=== Nasturtium ===
Genus Nasturtium:

- Nasturtium officinale R.Br. not indigenous, naturalised, invasive

=== Raphanus ===
Genus Raphanus:

- Raphanus raphanistrum L. not indigenous, naturalised, invasive
- Raphanus sativus L. not indigenous, cultivated, naturalised

=== Rapistrum ===
Genus Rapistrum:

- Rapistrum rugosum (L.) All. not indigenous, naturalised, invasive

=== Rorippa ===
Genus Rorippa:

- Rorippa fluviatilis (E.Mey. ex Sond.) Thell. indigenous
  - Rorippa fluviatilis (E.Mey. ex Sond.) Thell. var, caledonica (Sond.) Marais, indigenous
  - Rorippa fluviatilis (E.Mey. ex Sond.) Thell. var, fluviatilis, indigenous
- Rorippa madagascariensis (DC.) Hara, indigenous
- Rorippa nasturtium-aquaticum (L.) Hayek, accepted as Nasturtium officinale R.Br. not indigenous, naturalised
- Rorippa nudiuscula Thell. indigenous

=== Schlechteria ===
Genus Schlechteria:

- Schlechteria capensis Bolus, accepted as Heliophila monosperma Al-Shehbaz & Mumm. endemic

=== Silicularia ===
Genus Silicularia:

- Silicularia polygaloides (Schltr.) Marais, accepted as Heliophila polygaloides Schltr. endemic

=== Sinapis ===
Genus Sinapis:

- Sinapis alba L. not indigenous, naturalised
- Sinapis arvensis L. not indigenous, naturalised

=== Sisymbrium ===
Genus Sisymbrium:

- Sisymbrium burchellii DC. indigenous
  - Sisymbrium burchellii DC. var, burchellii, indigenous
- Sisymbrium capense Thunb. indigenous
- Sisymbrium irio L. not indigenous, naturalised
- Sisymbrium officinale (L.) Scop. not indigenous, naturalised
- Sisymbrium orientale L. not indigenous, naturalised
- Sisymbrium thellungii O.E.Schulz, accepted as Erucastrum austroafricanum Al-Shehbaz & Warwick, indigenous
- Sisymbrium turczaninowii Sond. indigenous

=== Thlaspeocarpa ===
Genus Thlaspeocarpa:

- Thlaspeocarpa capensis (Sond.) C.A.Sm. accepted as Heliophila suborbicularis Al-Shehbaz & Mumm. present
- Thlaspeocarpa namaquensis Marais, accepted as Heliophila namaquensis (Marais) Al-Shehbaz & Mumm. present

=== Thlaspi ===
Genus Thlaspi:

- Thlaspi arvense L. not indigenous, naturalised

=== Turritis ===
Genus Turritis:

- Turritis glabra L. not indigenous, naturalised

== Capparaceae ==
Family: Capparaceae,

=== Bachmannia ===
Genus Bachmannia:

- Bachmannia woodii (Oliv.) Gilg, endemic

=== Boscia ===
Genus Boscia:

- Boscia albitrunca (Burch.) Gilg & Gilg-Ben. indigenous
- Boscia angustifolia A.Rich. var, corymbosa (Gilg) DeWolf, indigenous
- Boscia filipes Gilg, accepted as Boscia foetida Schinz subsp, filipes (Gilg) Lotter, present
- Boscia foetida Schinz, indigenous
  - Boscia foetida Schinz subsp, filipes (Gilg) Lotter, indigenous
  - Boscia foetida Schinz subsp, foetida, indigenous
  - Boscia foetida Schinz subsp, longipedicellata (Gilg) Toelken, endemic
  - Boscia foetida Schinz subsp, minima Toelken, indigenous
  - Boscia foetida Schinz subsp, rehmanniana (Pestal.) Toelken, indigenous
- Boscia mossambicensis Klotzsch, indigenous
- Boscia oleoides (Burch. ex DC.) Toelken, endemic

=== Cadaba ===
Genus Cadaba:

- Cadaba aphylla (Thunb.) Wild, indigenous
- Cadaba natalensis Sond. indigenous
- Cadaba termitaria N.E.Br. indigenous

=== Capparis ===
Genus Capparis:

- Capparis brassii DC. indigenous
- Capparis fascicularis DC. indigenous
  - Capparis fascicularis DC. var, fascicularis, indigenous
  - Capparis fascicularis DC. var, zeyheri (Turcz.) Toelken, endemic
- Capparis sepiaria L. indigenous
  - Capparis sepiaria L. var, citrifolia (Lam.) Toelken, indigenous
  - Capparis sepiaria L. var, subglabra (Oliv.) DeWolf, indigenous
- Capparis tomentosa Lam. indigenous

=== Cladostemon ===
Genus Cladostemon:

- Cladostemon kirkii (Oliv.) Pax & Gilg, indigenous

=== Courbonia ===
Genus Courbonia:

- Courbonia edulis Gilg & Gilg-Ben. accepted as Maerua edulis (Gilg & Gilg-Ben.) DeWolf, present

=== Maerua ===
Genus Maerua:

- Maerua angolensis DC. indigenous
  - Maerua angolensis DC. subsp, angolensis, indigenous
- Maerua brevipetiolata Killick, indigenous
- Maerua cafra (DC.) Pax, indigenous
- Maerua decumbens (Brongn.) DeWolf, indigenous
- Maerua edulis (Gilg & Gilg-Ben.) DeWolf, indigenous
- Maerua gilgii Schinz, indigenous
- Maerua juncea Pax, indigenous
  - Maerua juncea Pax subsp, crustata (Wild) Wild, indigenous
- Maerua nervosa (Hochst.) Oliv. endemic
- Maerua parvifolia Pax, indigenous
- Maerua racemulosa (A.DC.) Gilg & Gilg-Ben. indigenous
- Maerua rosmarinoides (Sond.) Gilg & Gilg-Ben. indigenous
- Maerua schinzii Pax, indigenous

=== Thilachium ===
Genus Thilachium:

- Thilachium africanum Lour. indigenous

== Cleomaceae ==
Family: Cleomaceae,

=== Cleome ===
Genus Cleome:

- Cleome angustifolia Forssk. indigenous
  - Cleome angustifolia Forssk. subsp, diandra (Burch.) Kers, indigenous
  - Cleome angustifolia Forssk. subsp, petersiana (Klotzsch ex Sond.) Kers, indigenous
- Cleome bororensis (Klotzsch) Oliv. indigenous
- Cleome conrathii Burtt Davy, indigenous
- Cleome foliosa Hook.f. indigenous
- Cleome foliosa Hook.f. var, lutea (Sond.) Codd & Kers, indigenous
- Cleome gynandra L. indigenous
- Cleome hassleriana Chodat, accepted as Tarenaya hassleriana (Chodat) Iltis, not indigenous, naturalised, invasive
- Cleome hirta (Klotzsch) Oliv. indigenous
- Cleome kalachariensis (Schinz) Gilg & Gilg-Ben. indigenous
- Cleome macrophylla (Klotzsch) Briq. indigenous
- Cleome maculata (Sond.) Szyszyl. indigenous
- Cleome monophylla L. indigenous
- Cleome oxyphylla Burch. indigenous
  - Cleome oxyphylla Burch. var, oxyphylla, indigenous
  - Cleome oxyphylla Burch. var, robusta Kers, endemic
- Cleome paxii (Schinz) Gilg & Gilg-Ben. indigenous
- Cleome rubella Burch. indigenous
- Cleome schlechteri Briq. endemic

=== Tarenaya ===
Genus Tarenaya:

- Tarenaya hassleriana (Chodat) Iltis, not indigenous, naturalised, invasive

== Resedaceae ==
Family: Resedaceae,

=== Oligomeris ===
Genus Oligomeris:

- Oligomeris dipetala (Aiton) Turcz. indigenous
  - Oligomeris dipetala (Aiton) Turcz. var, dipetala, indigenous
- Oligomeris dregeana (Mull.Arg.) Mull.Arg. indigenous

=== Reseda ===
Genus Reseda:

- Reseda lutea L. not indigenous, naturalised, invasive
  - Reseda lutea L. subsp, lutea var, nutans, not indigenous, naturalised, invasive

== Salvadoraceae ==
Family: Salvadoraceae,

=== Azima ===
Genus Azima:

- Azima tetracantha Lam. indigenous

=== Salvadora ===
Genus Salvadora:

- Salvadora australis Schweick. indigenous
- Salvadora persica L. indigenous
  - Salvadora persica L. var, persica, indigenous
  - Salvadora persica L. var, pubescens Brenan, indigenous

== Tropaeolaceae ==
Family: Tropaeolaceae,

=== Tropaeolum ===
Genus Tropaeolum:

- Tropaeolum majus L. not indigenous, cultivated, naturalised, invasive
- Tropaeolum speciosum Poepp. & Endl. not indigenous, naturalised, invasive
