= Bastard cabbage =

Bastard cabbage is a common name for several plants and may refer to:

- Rapistrum species, especially
  - Rapistrum rugosum, native to Eurasia and parts of Africa
- Andira inermis, the bastard cabbage tree
