= Aplanodes =

Aplanodes may refer to:

- Aplanodes (planthopper), a genus of true bugs in the family Delphacidae
- Aplanodes (plant), a genus of flowering plants in the family Brassicaceae
