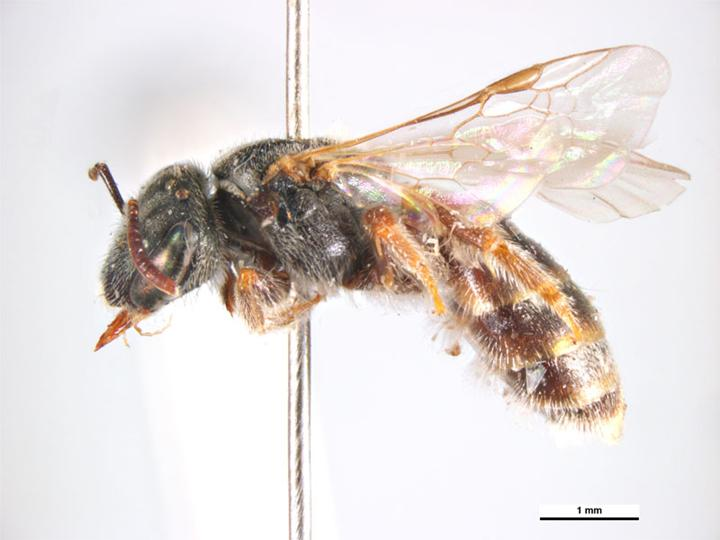
- Female
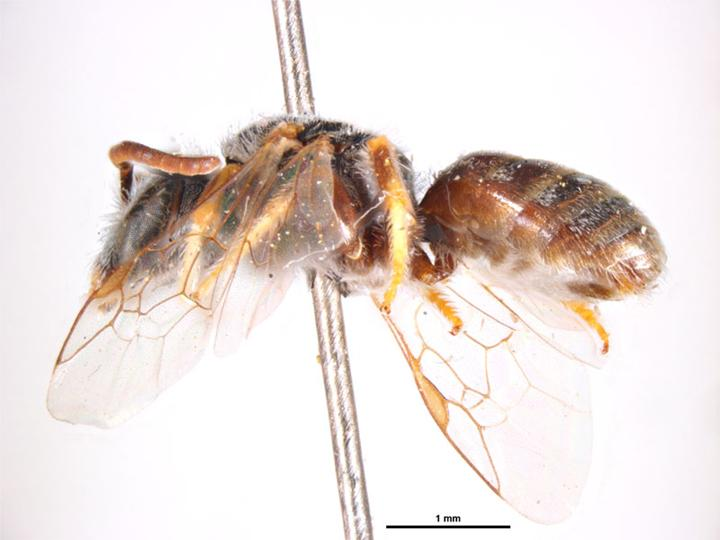
- Male

Scientific classification
- Kingdom: Animalia
- Phylum: Arthropoda
- Clade: Pancrustacea
- Class: Insecta
- Order: Hymenoptera
- Family: Halictidae
- Genus: Lasioglossum
- Species: L. plebeium

Binomial name
- Lasioglossum plebeium (Cockerell, 1914)

Synonyms
- Halictus plebeius Cockerell, 1914

= Lasioglossum plebeium =

Species of bee

Lasioglossum plebeium, or Lasioglossum (Chilalictus) plebeium, is a species of bee in the family Halictidae and subfamily Halictinae. It is endemic to Australia. It was described by British-American entomologist Theodore Dru Alison Cockerell in 1914.

== Description ==
Female body length is about 6.5 mm, male 5 mm. Integumental colouration is mainly black, with reddish to brown markings.

== Distribution and habitat ==
The species occurs across southern mainland Australia. The type locality is Purnong, South Australia.

== Behaviour ==
The adults are flying mellivores. Flowering plants visited by the bees include Atalaya, Carpobrotus, Eremophila, Eucalyptus, Aizoon, Leptospermum, Oxalis, Pultenaea and Rapistrum species.
