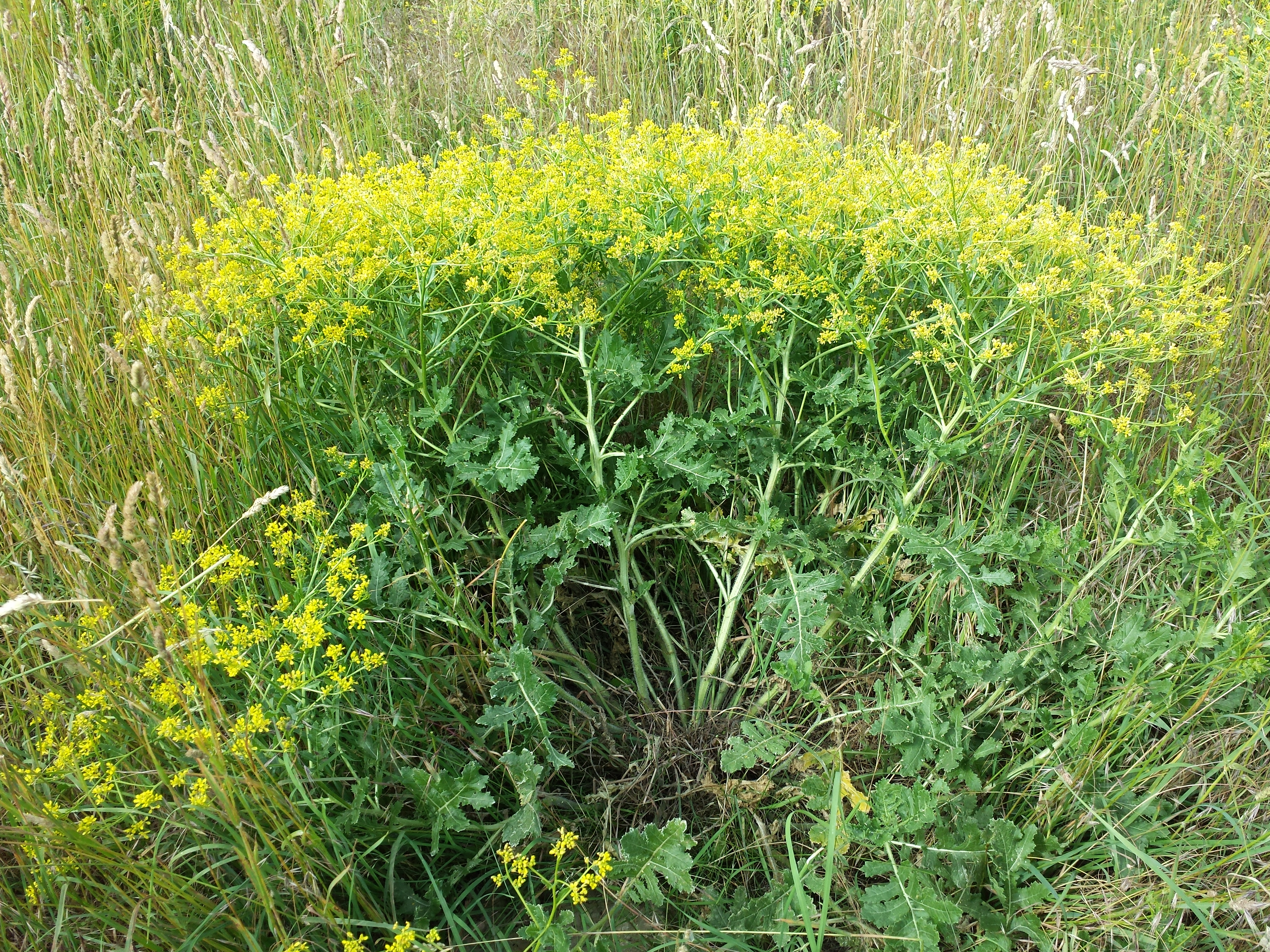

Scientific classification
- Kingdom: Plantae
- Clade: Tracheophytes
- Clade: Angiosperms
- Clade: Eudicots
- Clade: Rosids
- Order: Brassicales
- Family: Brassicaceae
- Genus: Rapistrum
- Species: R. perenne

Binomial name
- Rapistrum perenne (L.) All.

= Rapistrum perenne =

Species of flowering plant

Rapistrum perenne is a species of flowering plant in the mustard family commonly known as the perennial bastard cabbage. It is natively found between east, central, and southeast Europe and the Caucusus, but has also been introduced to a number of other European countries. It was first collected in 1922 from southeastern Saskatchewan, but has not been seen there since 1932; it was introduced to North America, but unlike Rapistrum rugosum did not persist as a naturalized population.

== Gallery ==
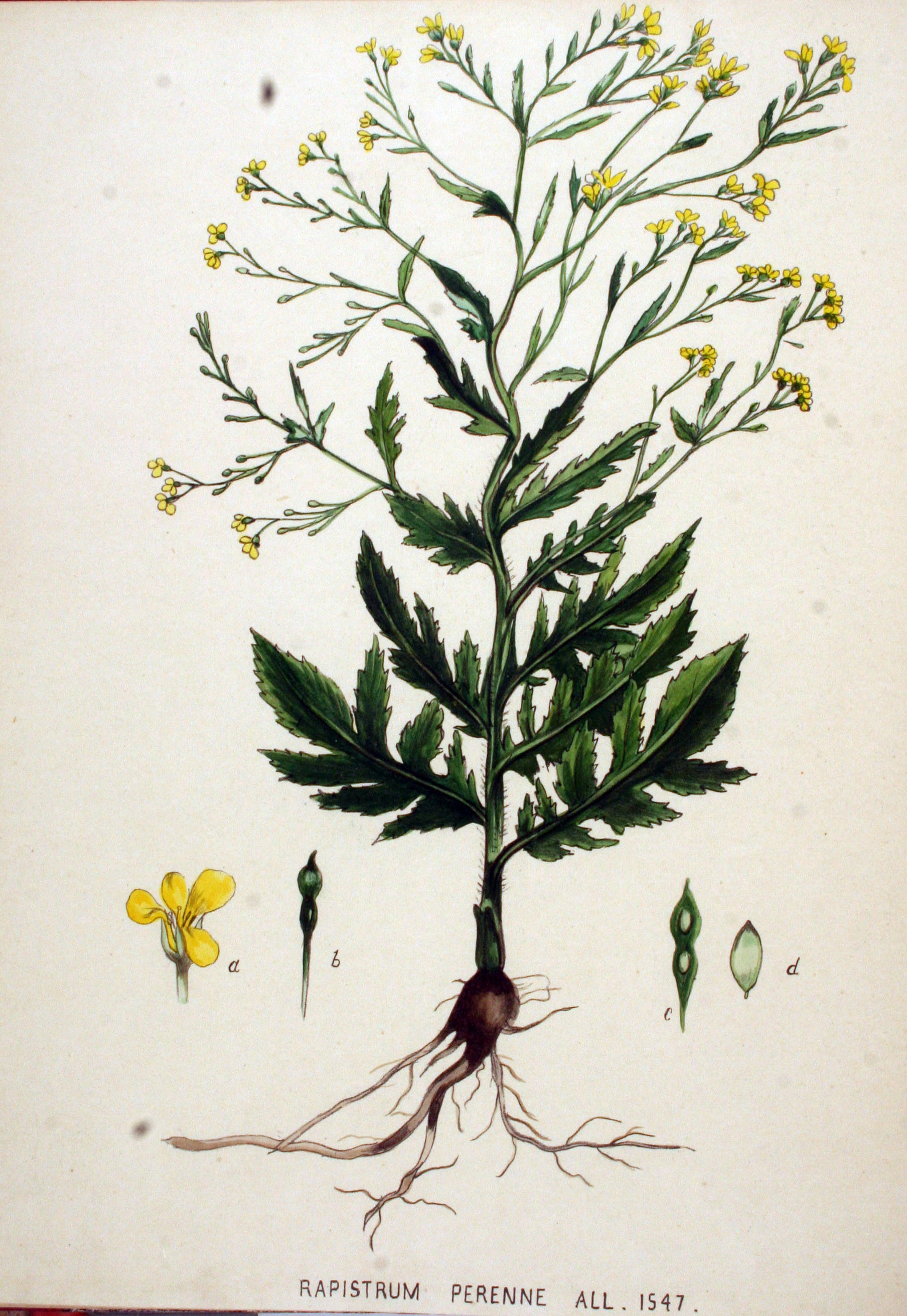
Botanical drawing

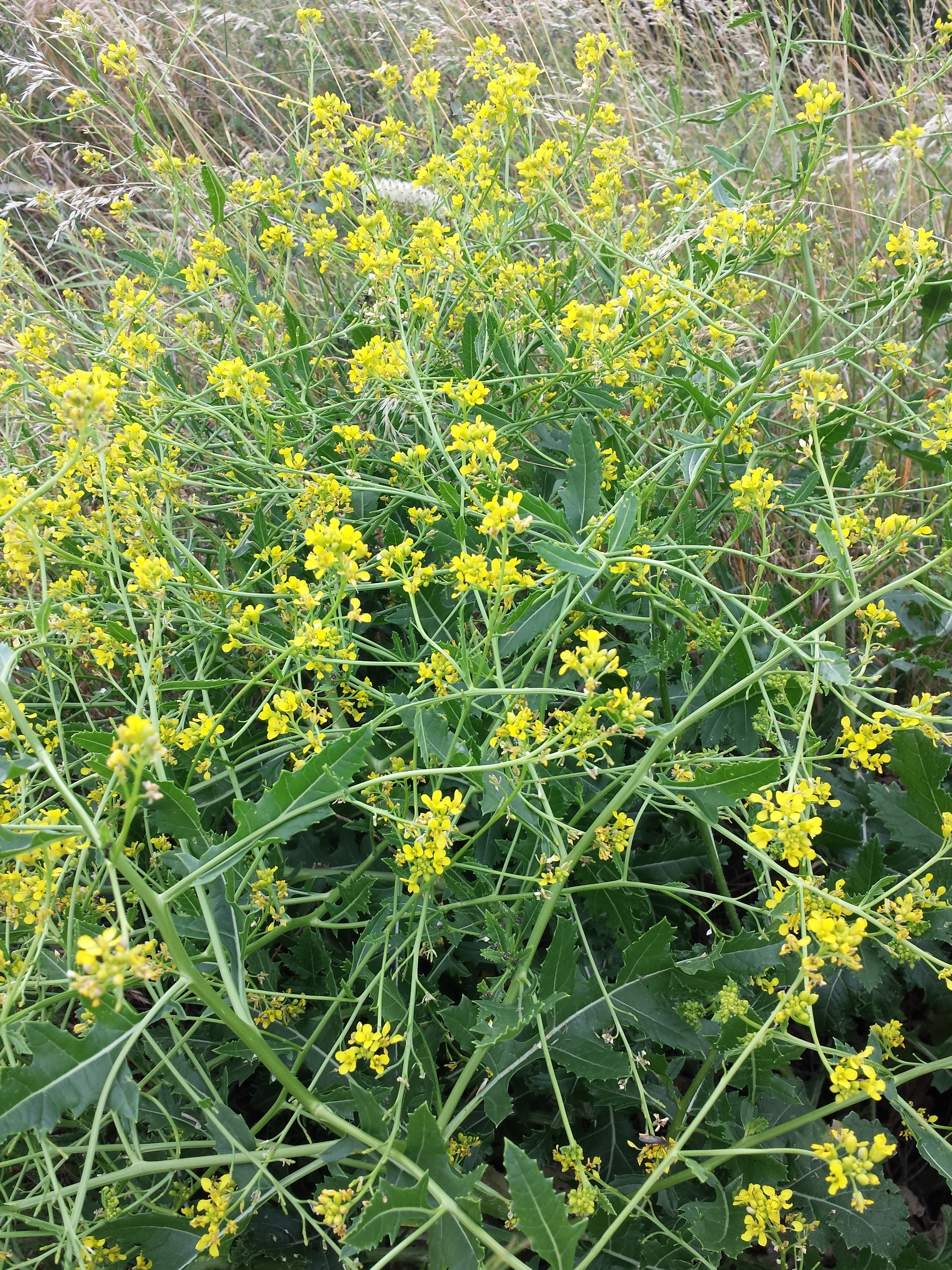

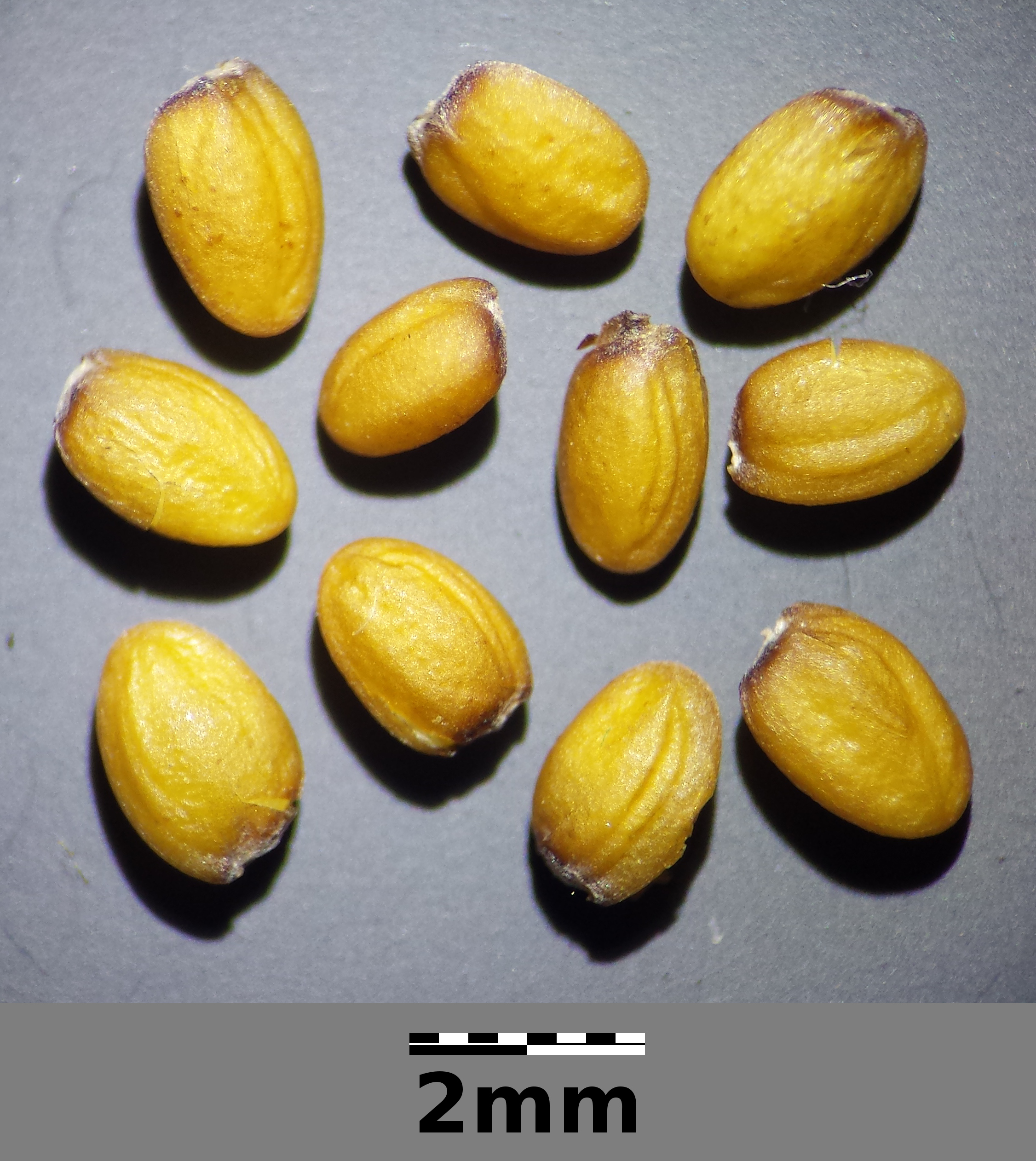
Seeds
