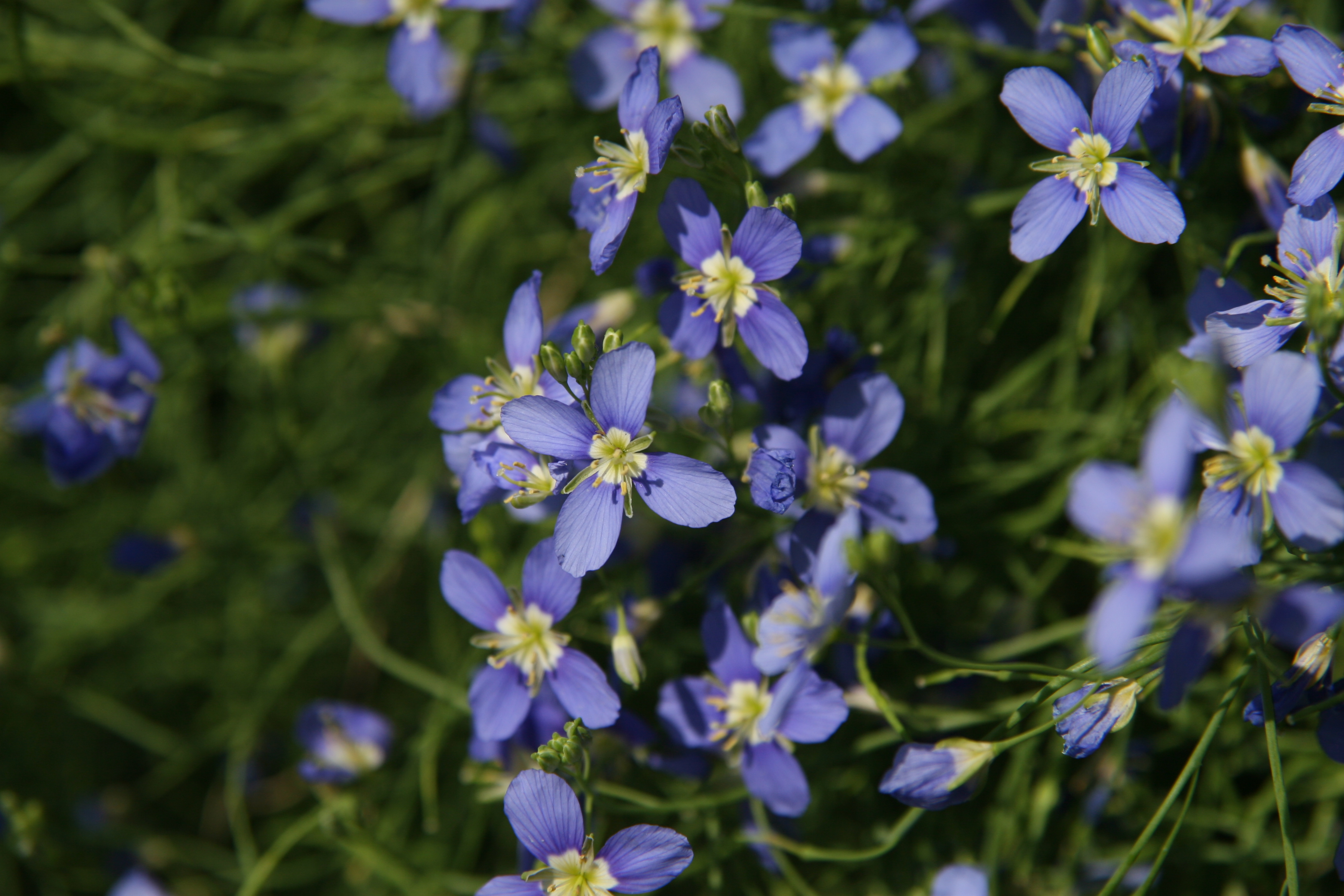

Conservation status
- Least Concern (SANBI Red List)

Scientific classification
- Kingdom: Plantae
- Clade: Tracheophytes
- Clade: Angiosperms
- Clade: Eudicots
- Clade: Rosids
- Order: Brassicales
- Family: Brassicaceae
- Genus: Heliophila
- Species: H. coronopifolia

Binomial name
- Heliophila coronopifolia L.

Synonyms
- Carponema filiformis (L.f.) Eckl. & Zeyh.; Heliophila azurea Willd. ex Sond.; Heliophila dissecta Thunb.; Heliophila filifolia Thunb.; Heliophila filiformis Lam.; Heliophila filiformis L.f.; Heliophila fistulosa Sond.; Heliophila heterophylla Thunb.; Heliophila liniflora Eckl. & Zeyh.; Heliophila longifolia DC.; Heliophila pendula Pall. ex Sond.; Heliophila sonchifolia DC.; Heliophila sphaerostigma Kunze; Heliophila tenella Banks ex DC.; Leptormus caledonicus Eckl. & Zeyh.; Leptormus dissectus Eckl. & Zeyh.; Leptormus tenellus Eckl. & Zeyh.

= Heliophila coronopifolia =

Species of flowering plant

Heliophila coronopifolia is a species of flowering plant in the genus Heliophila. It is native to the Northern Cape and Western Cape provinces of South Africa.

== Distribution ==
Heliophila coronopifolia is found from Namaqualand to the Western Cape.

== Conservation status ==
Heliophila coronopifolia is classified as Least Concern.
