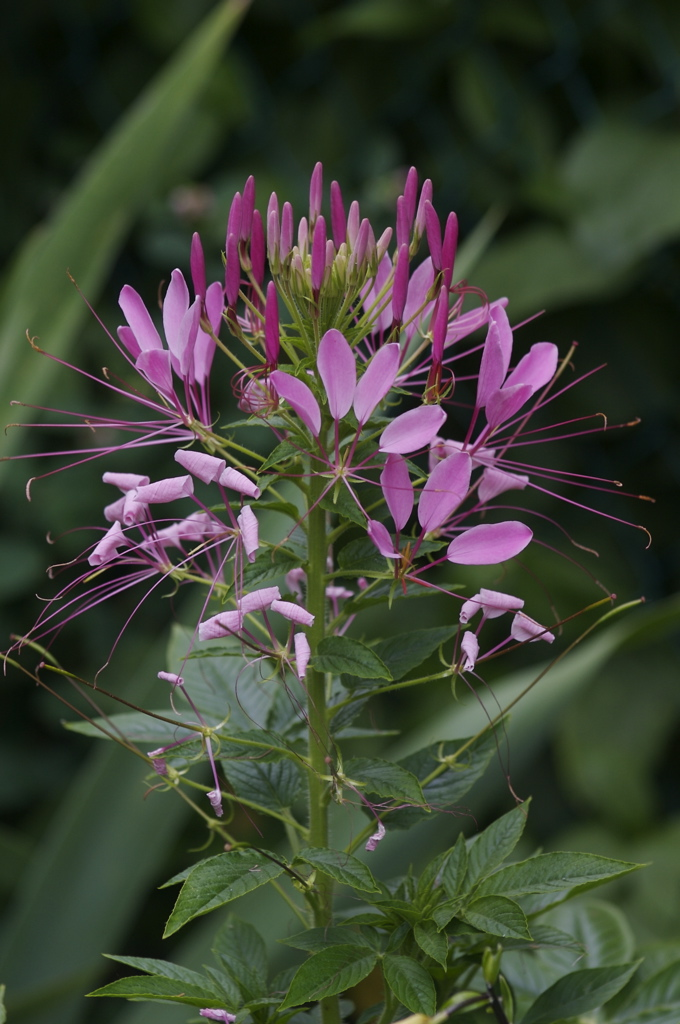

Scientific classification
- Kingdom: Plantae
- Clade: Tracheophytes
- Clade: Angiosperms
- Clade: Eudicots
- Clade: Rosids
- Order: Brassicales
- Family: Cleomaceae
- Genus: Cleome
- Species: C. houtteana

Binomial name
- Cleome houtteana Schltdl.

Synonyms
- Cleome hassleriana Chodat; Cleome sesquiorygalis Naudin ex C.Huber; Tarenaya hassleriana (Chodat) Iltis; Tarenaya hassleriana var. parviflora Verloove & Lambinon

= Cleome houtteana =

Species of flowering plant

Cleome houtteana, commonly known as spider flower, spider plant, pink queen, or grandfather's whiskers, is a species of flowering plant in the genus Cleome of the family Cleomaceae, native to southern South America in Argentina, Paraguay, Uruguay, and southeast Brazil. It has also been introduced to South Asia, including the Haor area of Bangladesh and India.

It is an annual growing to a height of 150 cm (60 in), with spirally arranged leaves. It has a height of 90 cm (35 in) to 180 cm (71 in). The leaves are palmately compound, with five or seven leaflets, the leaflets up to 12 cm (5 in) long and 4 cm (2 in) broad and the leaf petiole up to 15 cm (6 in) long. Its maximum crown width ranges from 30 cm (12 in) to 60 cm (24 in). The flowers are purple, pink, or white, with four petals and six long stamens. The fruit is a capsule up to 15 cm long and 3 mm (0.1 in) broad, containing several seeds. Flowering lasts from late spring to early fall.

The scented blooms are sometimes compared to citronella.

Cleome houtteana is commonly cultivated in temperate regions as a half-hardy annual. Numerous cultivars have been selected for flower color and other attributes. The "Queen" series includes the cultivars 'Violet Queen', 'Rose Queen', and 'White Queen'. The cultivar 'Helen Campbell' has gained the Royal Horticultural Society's Award of Garden Merit (confirmed 2017).

== Misidentification ==
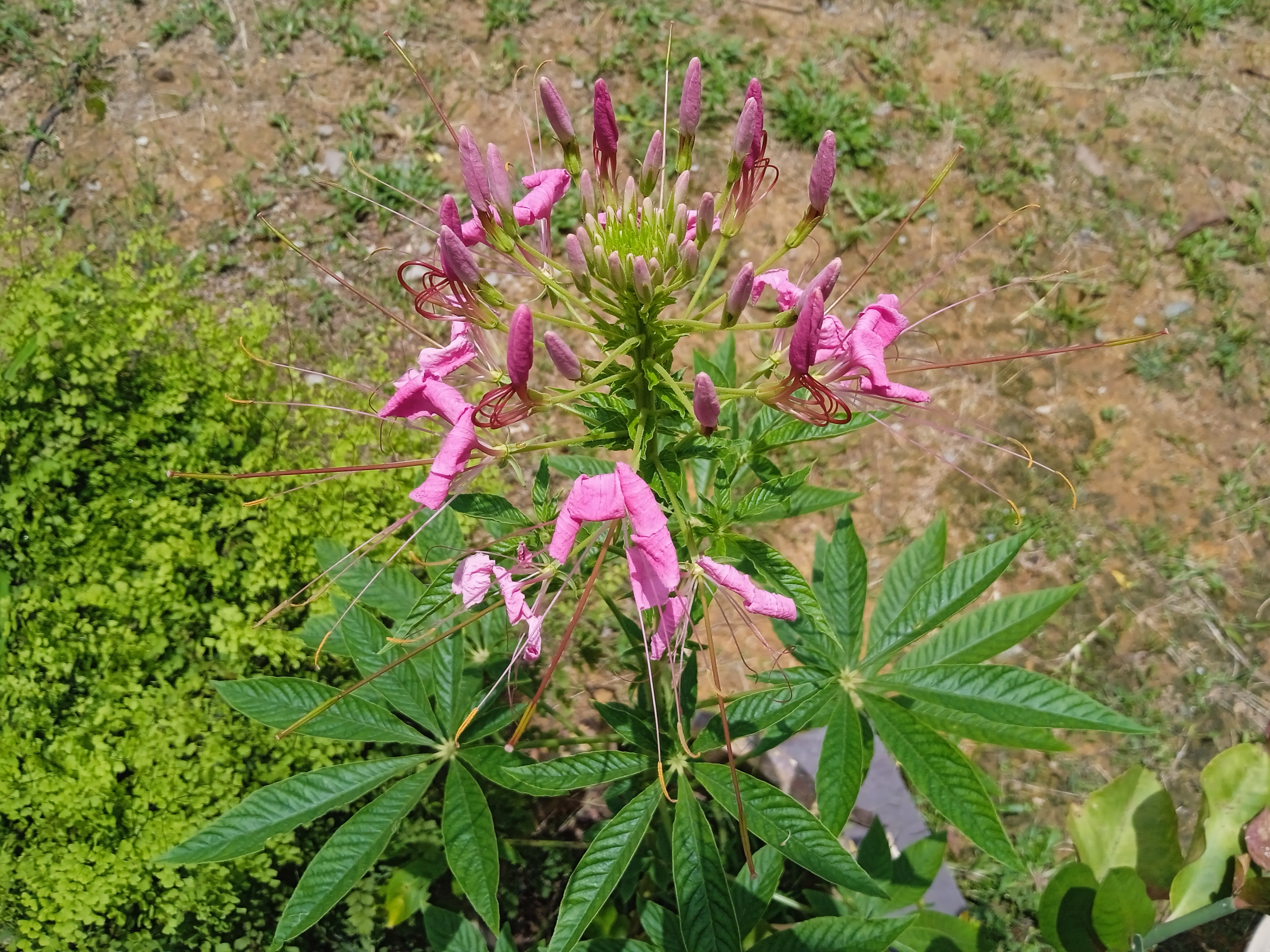
The leaves of this species resemble cannibis

The plant is sometimes mistakenly identified as cannabis due to its leaves and general growth shape. It also shares a similar odor, a foetid or skunky smell produced by the glandular hairs.

Plants in cultivation have also at times been misidentified as Cleome arborea, C. pungens or C. spinosa.

== Gallery ==
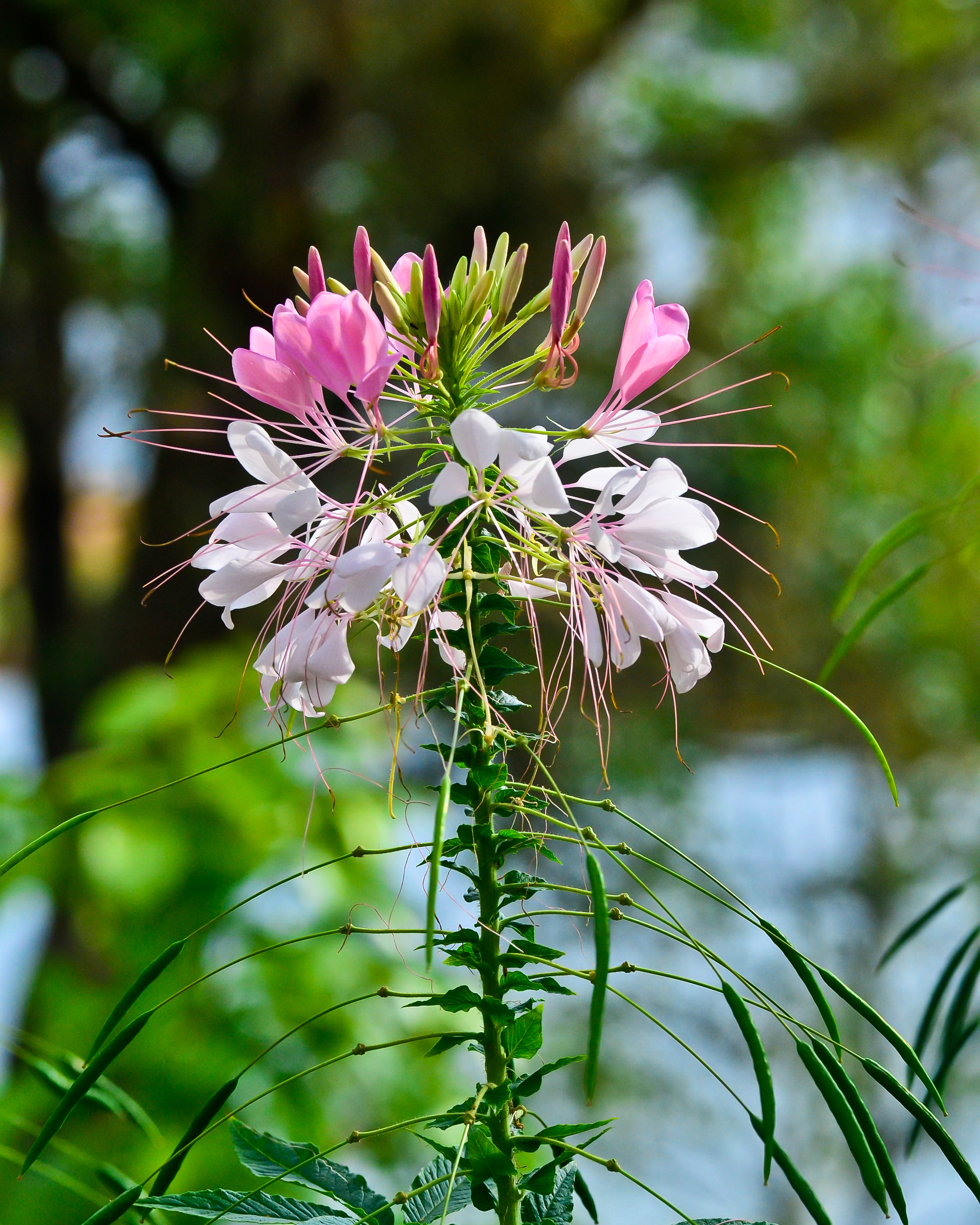

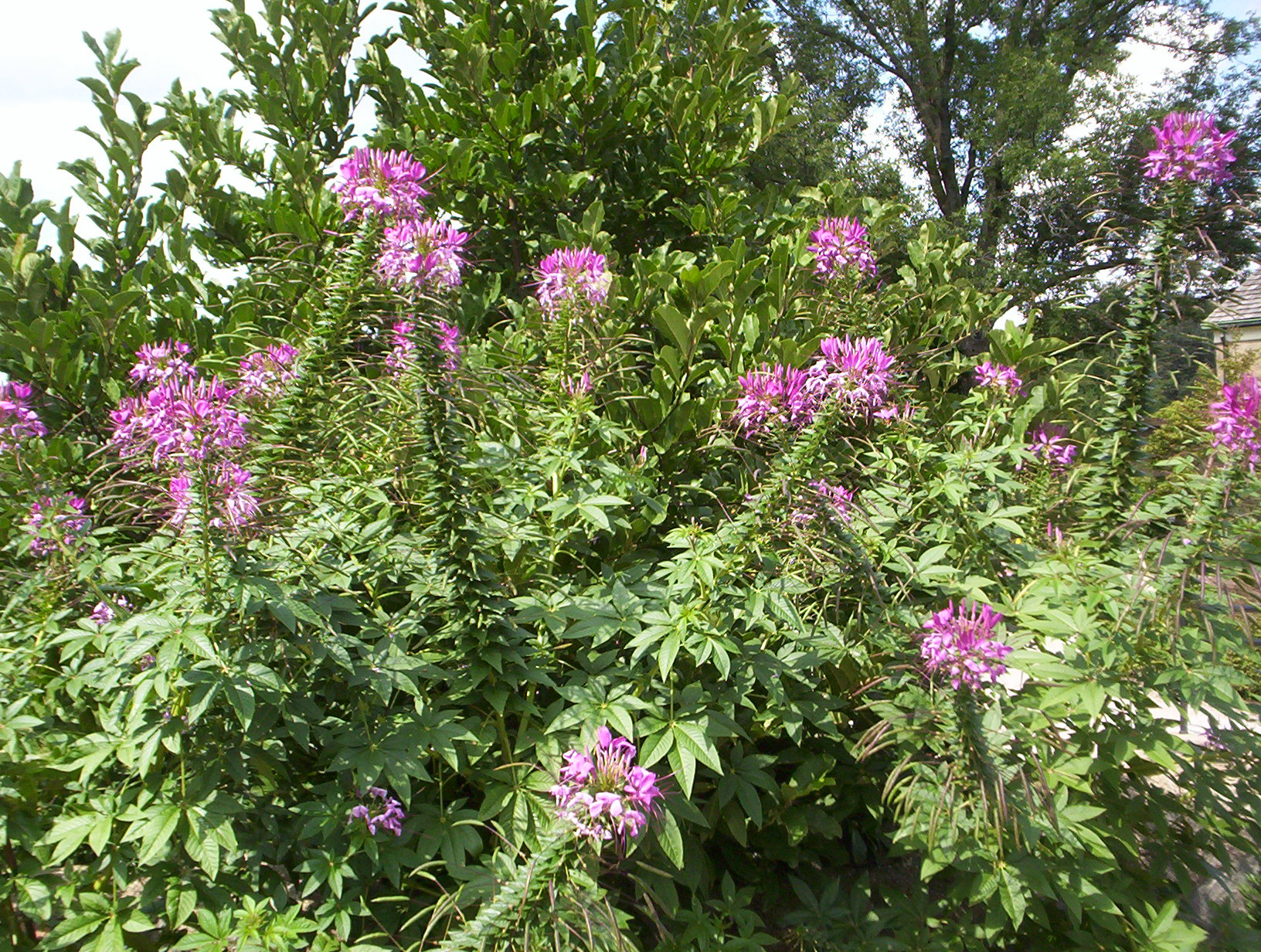

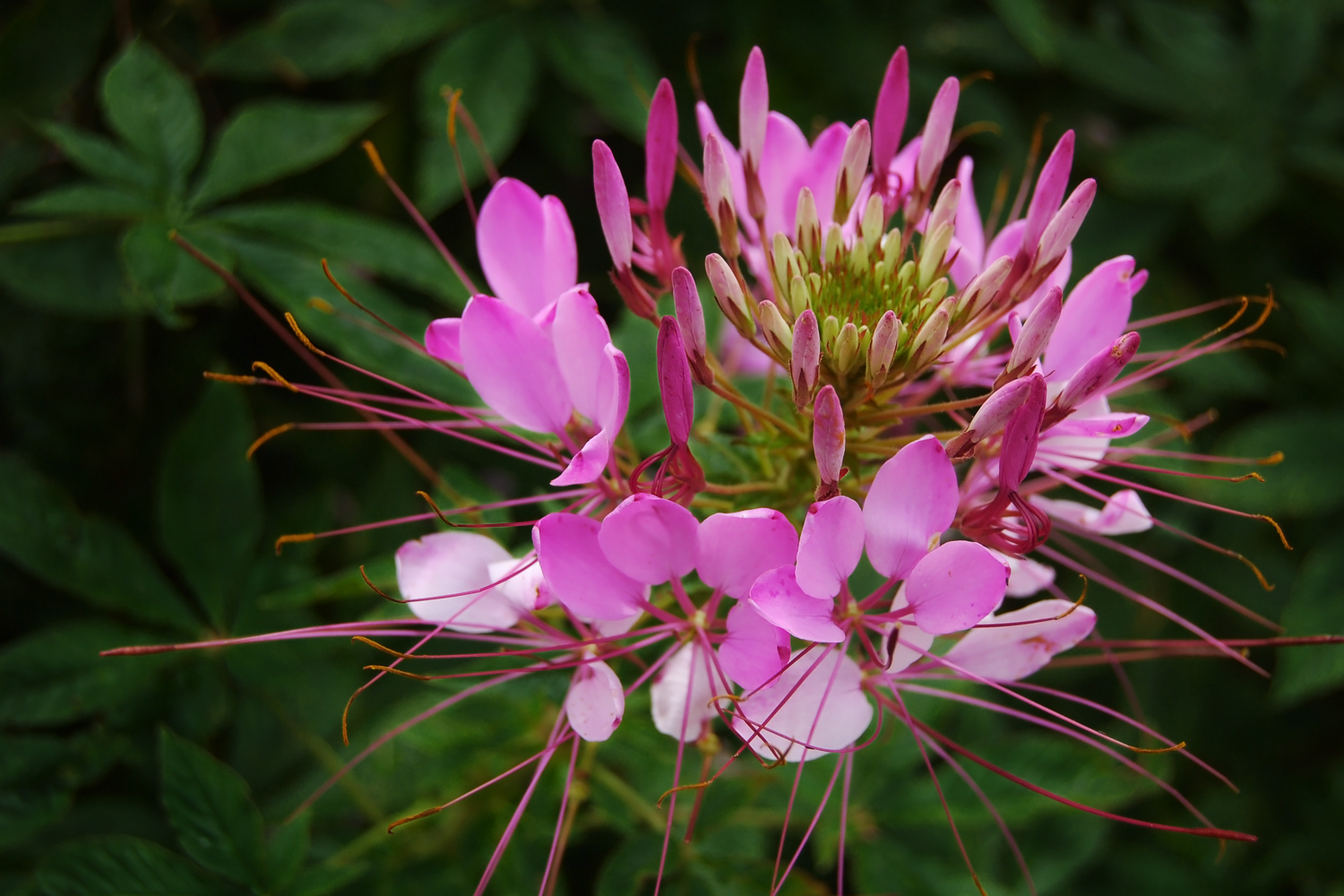
Pink inflorescence

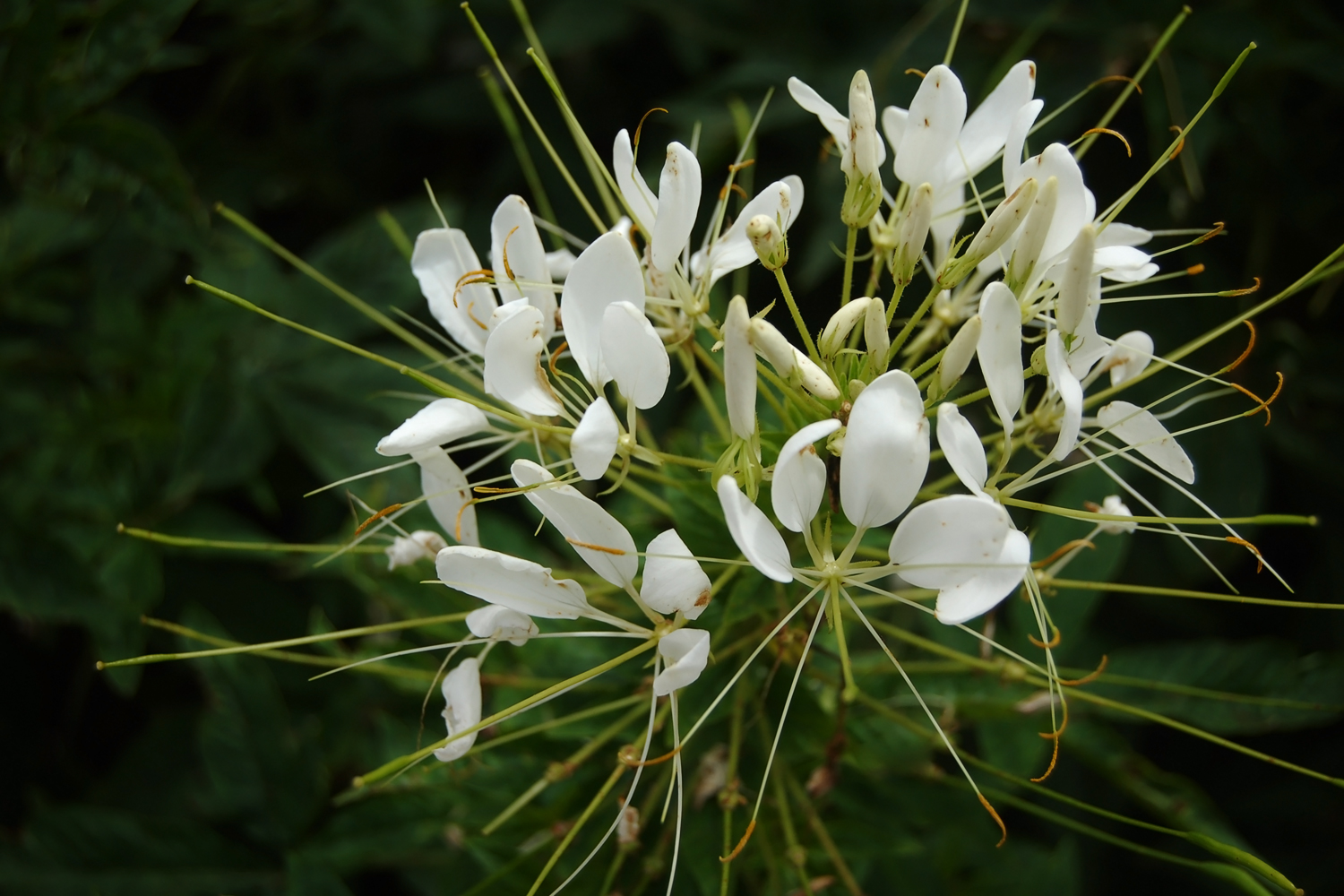
White inflorescence

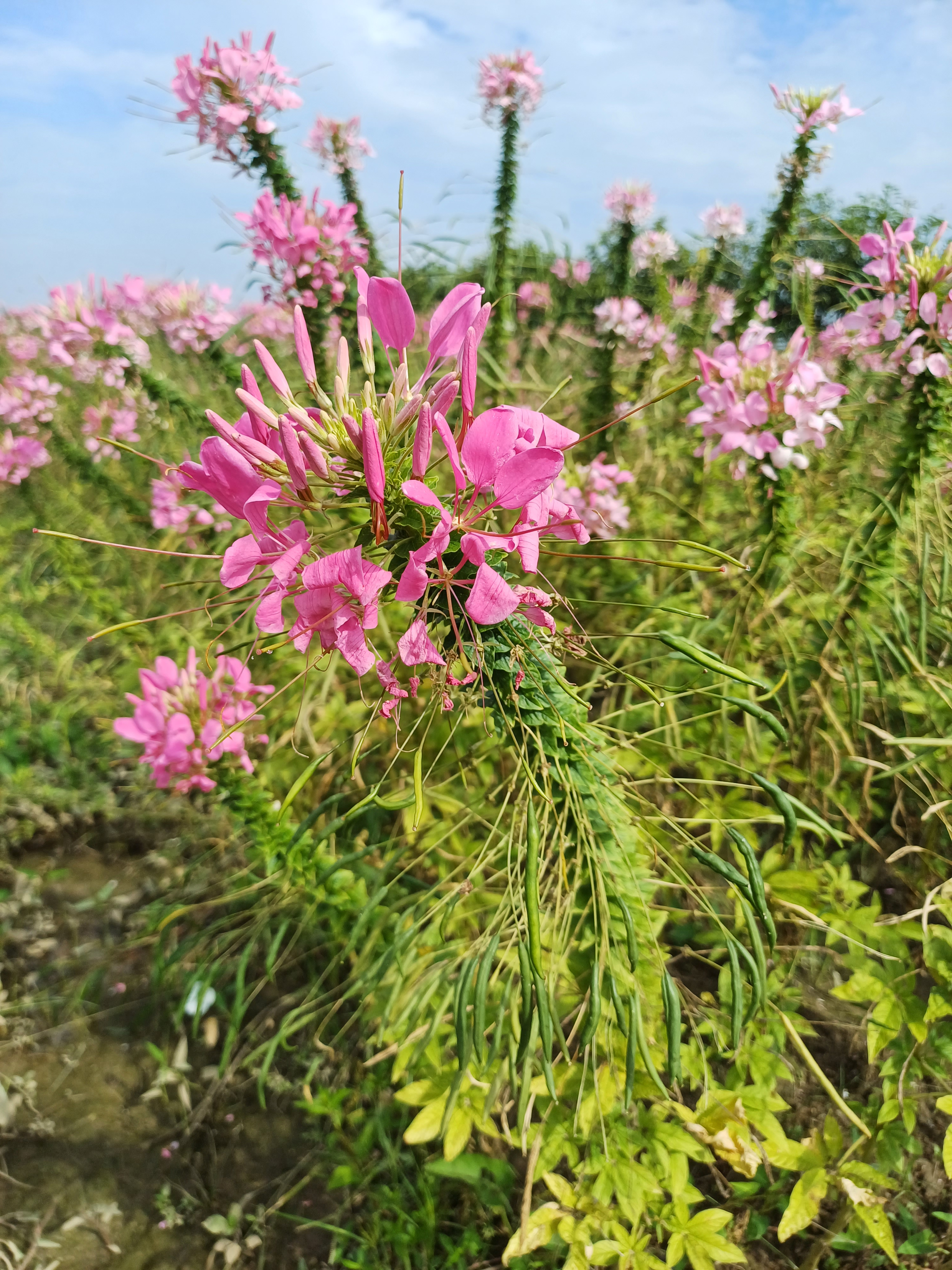
