= Chamira =

Scientific classification
- Kingdom: Plantae
- Clade: Tracheophytes
- Clade: Angiosperms
- Clade: Eudicots
- Clade: Rosids
- Order: Brassicales
- Family: Brassicaceae
- Genus: Chamira; Thunb.
- Species: C. circaeoides

Binomial name
- Chamira circaeoides (L.f.) Zahlbr.

Synonyms
- Bunias paradoxa Banks ex DC.; Chamira cornuta Thunb.; Heliophila chamira Forsyth f.; Heliophila circaeoides L.f. (1782) (basionym)

Genus of flowering plants

Chamira is a genus of flowering plants belonging to the family Brassicaceae. It includes a single species, Chamira circaeoides, an annual native to the western and southwestern Cape Provinces of South Africa.
