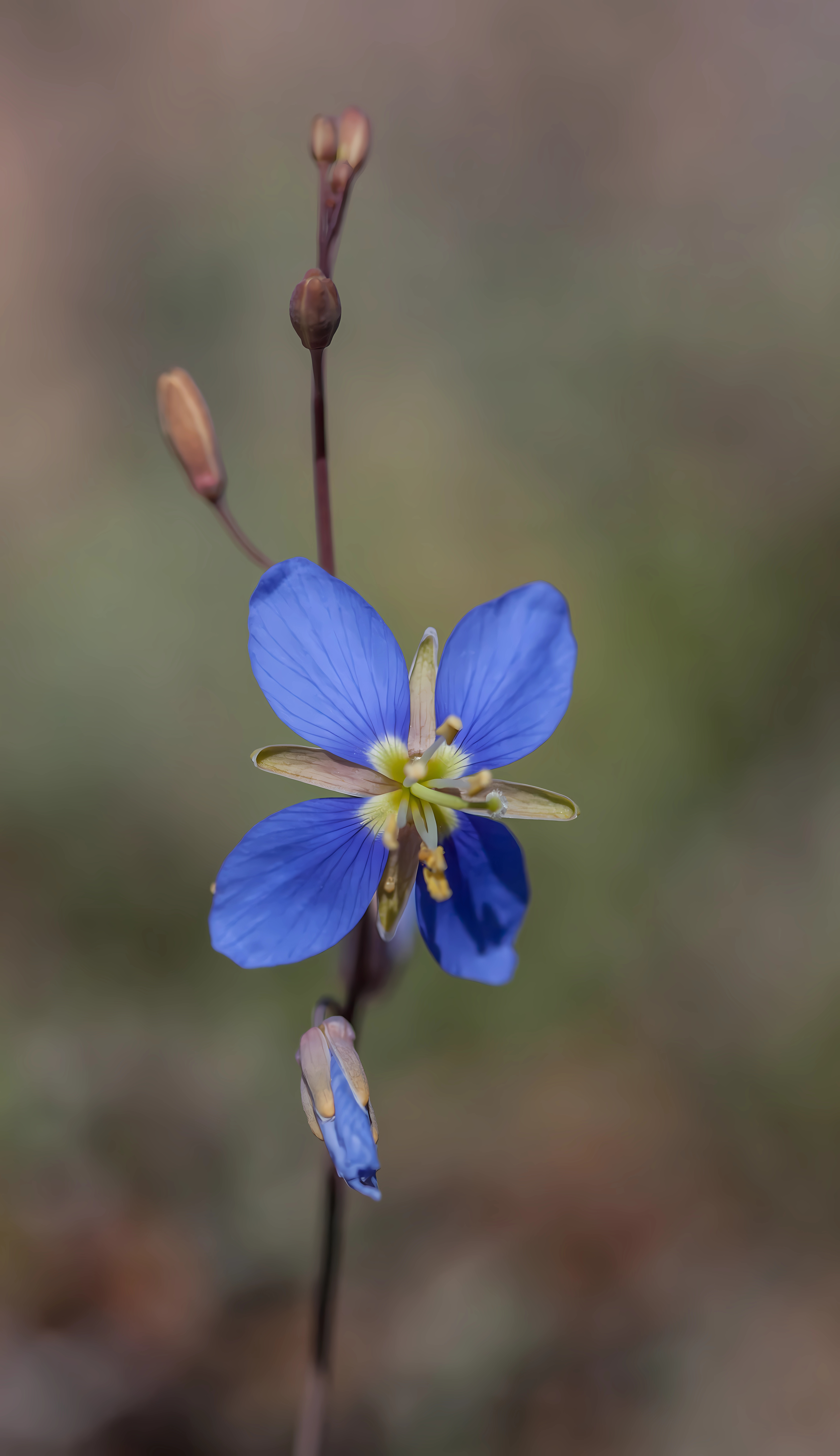

Scientific classification
- Kingdom: Plantae
- Clade: Tracheophytes
- Clade: Angiosperms
- Clade: Eudicots
- Clade: Rosids
- Order: Brassicales
- Family: Brassicaceae
- Genus: Heliophila; Burm.f. ex L.

Species
- See text

= Heliophila =

Genus of flowering plants

Heliophila is a genus of flowering plants in the family Brassicaceae. Members of this genus are either annuals or perennials and some are popular as ornamental plants. Endemic to southern Africa, the majority of the approximately 80 species grow in South Africa, particularly the Cape Floristic Region, while a few extend into the Namib Desert.

== Taxonomic history ==
The first recognised published description of Heliophila appears in the second edition of Species Plantarum by Carl Linnaeus, printed in 1763. He attributes his description, however, to Nicolaas Laurens Burman, a Dutch botanist. The generic name Heliophila is Latin but originally derived from the Ancient Greek words hēlios (ἥλιος), meaning "sun", and phílos (φίλος), meaning "dear" or "beloved", and refers to the blooms opening in sun and closing at night or in overcast conditions, a habit of many of the species within the genus.

In general, contention abounds regarding phylogenetic relationships in the family Brassicaceae. In the past, using morphological characters to establish tribes and genera was misleading and created dissension among systematists. The classification of species within Brassicaceae is gradually resolving through molecular phylogeny investigation, using internal transcribed spacer (ITS) data and other new-found sequencing knowledge.

Previously there were six genera within the tribe Heliophileae, all endemic to southern Africa: Heliophila, Cycloptychis, Schlechteri, Silicularia, Thlaspeocarpa, and Brachycarpaea. The latter five genera contained among them only seven species, having been differentiated from the genus Heliophila mainly on morphological differences in the fruits they bore. Following extensive analysis of molecular evidence (nuclear (ITS) and plastid (trnL-F) DNA sequence data), Heliophileae was found to be monophyletic and the five small genera were reduced to synonymy with Heliophila.

== Distribution ==
Heliophila is one of only two genera of Brassicaceae endemic to southern Africa. The majority of the species grow in the winter-rainfall Cape Floristic Region and the more arid Namaqualand, while a smaller portion extend to the rest of South Africa, Namibia, Eswatini, and Lesotho. None of the members of this genus are listed on the IUCN Red List of Threatened Species.

== Description and habit ==
Heliophila is regarded as one of the most diverse genera in the family Brassicaceae. Flower size, for example, varies greatly, with this genus containing both the largest of petals within the family (H. juncea) to the smallest (H. pectinata). There is a range of flower colour, with blue, white, and pink being the most common. Blue is an unusual colour for Brassicaceae, being known in only one other genus, the unrelated Solms-laubachia from the Himalayas.

Within the genus are mainly herbs and subshrubs, although shrubs and lianas appear as well. They may be annual or perennial and the majority of the fruits produced by species in this genus are dehiscent, not woody, and lack a carpophore. The plants are generally either glabrous or possess simple hairs. Leaves are variable; they are narrow or broad, but usually simple, and may be entire, lobed, or pinnatipartite. The inflorescences are usually the raceme type.

== Species ==
Accepted species:

- Heliophila acuminata (Eckl. & Zeyh.) Steud, 1840
- Heliophila adpressa O.E. Schulz
- Heliophila affinis Sond., 1846
- Heliophila africana (L.) Marais, 1970
- Heliophila alpina Marais
- Heliophila amplexicaulis L.f., 1782
- Heliophila arenaria Sond.
- Heliophila arenosa Schltr., 1899
- Heliophila brachycarpa Meisn., 1842
- Heliophila brassicaefolia Eckl. & Zeyh.
- Heliophila brassicifolia Eckl. & Zeyh.
- Heliophila bulbostyla Barnes
- Heliophila callosa (L.f.) DC., 1821
- Heliophila carnosa (Thunb.) Steud., 1840
- Heliophila cedarbergensis Marais
- Heliophila cinerea Marais, 1970
- Heliophila collina O.E. Schulz
- Heliophila concatenata Sond., 1846
- Heliophila cornellsbergia B.J. Pienaar & Nicholas
- Heliophila cornuta Sond., 1846
- Heliophila carnosa (Thunb.) Steud., 1840
- Heliophila coronopifolia L.
- Heliophila crithmifolia Willd., 1809
- Heliophila cuneata Marais
- Heliophila decurva Schltr., 1913
- Heliophila deserticola Schltr., 1913
- Heliophila diffusa (Thunb.) DC.
- Heliophila digitata L.f., 1782
- Heliophila dissecta Thunb.
- Heliophila dregeana Sond., 1846
- Heliophila elata Sond.
- Heliophila elongata DC.
- Heliophila ephemera P.A.Bean
- Heliophila esterhuyseniae Marais
- Heliophila eximia Marais
- Heliophila filicaulis Marais
- Heliophila formosa Hilliard & B.L.Burtt
- Heliophila gariepina Schltr.
- Heliophila glauca Burch. ex DC.
- Heliophila hurkana Al-Shehbaz & Mumm.
- Heliophila juncea (P.J.Bergius) Druce
- Heliophila katbergensis Marais
- Heliophila laciniata Marais
- Heliophila lactea Schltr.
- Heliophila leptophylla Schltr.
- Heliophila linearis DC.
- Heliophila linoides Schltr.
- Heliophila macowaniana Schltr.
- Heliophila macra Schltr.
- Heliophila macrosperma Burch. ex DC.
- Heliophila maraisiana Al-Shehbaz & Mumm.
- Heliophila meyeri Sond.
- Heliophila minima (Stephens) Marais
- Heliophila monosperma Al-Shehbaz & Mumm.
- Heliophila namaquana Bolus
- Heliophila namaquensis (Marais) Al-Shehbaz & Mumm.
- Heliophila nubigena Schltr.
- Heliophila obibensis Marais
- Heliophila patens Oliv.
- Heliophila pectinata Burch. ex DC.
- Heliophila pendula Willd.
- Heliophila pinnata L.f.
- Heliophila polygaloides Schltr.
- Heliophila promontorii Marais
- Heliophila pubescens Burch. ex Sond.
- Heliophila pusilla L.f.
- Heliophila ramosissima O.E.Schulz
- Heliophila refracta Sond.
- Heliophila remotiflora O.E.Schulz
- Heliophila rigidiuscula Sond.
- Heliophila rimicola Marais
- Heliophila scandens Harv.
- Heliophila schulzii Marais
- Heliophila scoparia Burch. ex DC.
- Heliophila seselifolia Burch. ex DC.
- Heliophila suavissima Burch. ex DC.
- Heliophila suborbicularis Al-Shehbaz & Mumm.
- Heliophila subulata Burch. ex DC.
- Heliophila tabularis Dod
- Heliophila thunbergii Steud.
- Heliophila tricuspidata Schltr.
- Heliophila trifurca Burch. ex DC.
- Heliophila tulbaghensis Schinz
- Heliophila variabilis Burch. ex DC.
