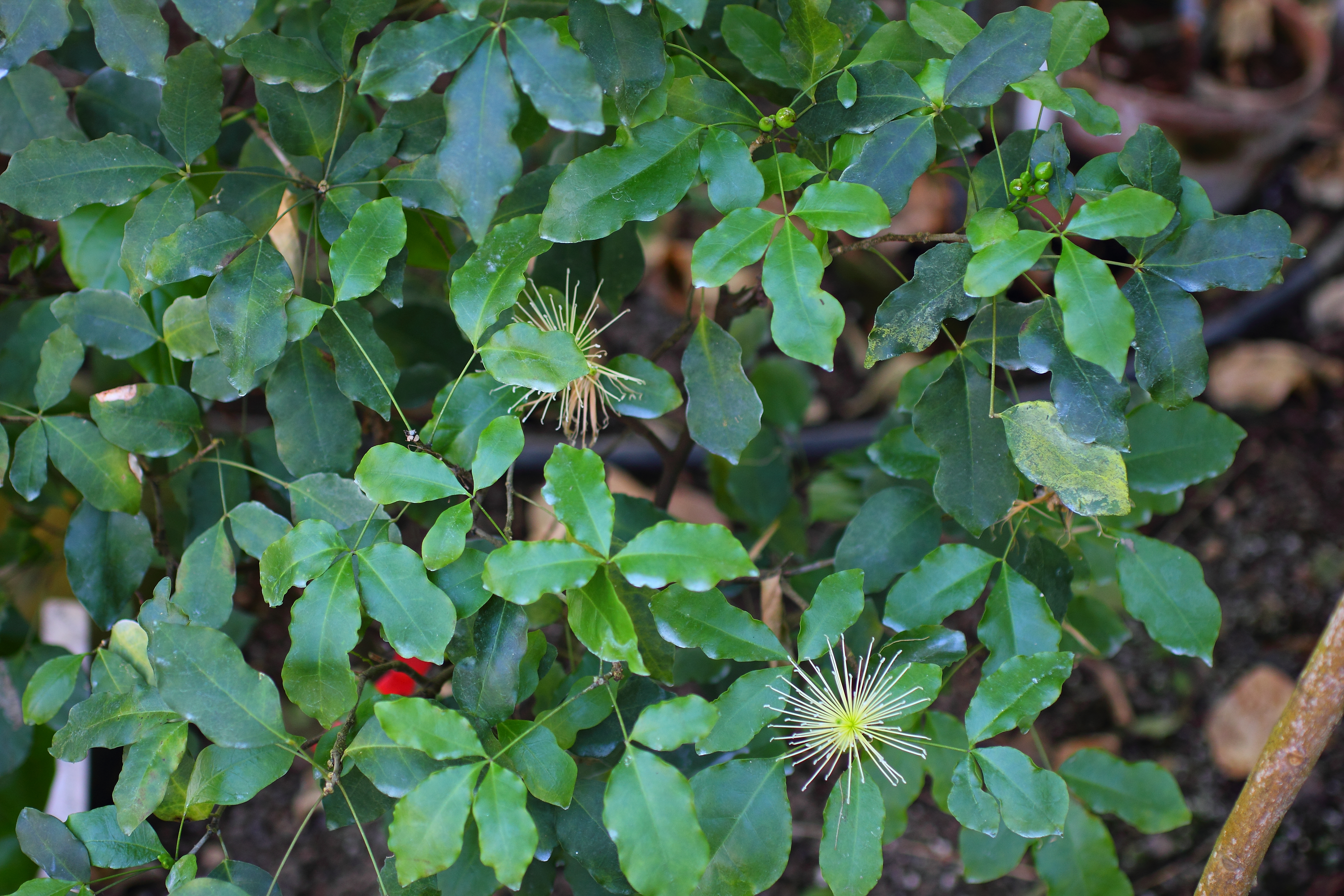
- Tilachium panduriforme

Scientific classification
- Kingdom: Plantae
- Clade: Embryophytes
- Clade: Tracheophytes
- Clade: Spermatophytes
- Clade: Angiosperms
- Clade: Eudicots
- Clade: Rosids
- Order: Brassicales
- Family: Capparaceae
- Genus: Thilachium; Lour.

Synonyms
- Thylachium Lour.

= Thilachium =

Genus of flowering plants

Thilachium is a genus of flowering plants belonging to the family Capparaceae. Its native range is Somalia to Southern Africa, Madagascar, Mauritius.

== Taxonomy ==
The genus was described by João de Loureiro and published in Flora Cochinchinensis 328, 342. 1790. The type species is: Thilachium africanum Lour.

Species:

- Thilachium africanum Lour.
- Thilachium angustifolium Bojer
- Thilachium densiflorum Gilg & Gilg-Ben.
- Thilachium humbertii Hadj-Moust.
- Thilachium laurifolium Baker
- Thilachium macrophyllum Gilg
- Thilachium monophyllum Hadj-Moust.
- Thilachium panduriforme (Lam.) Juss.
- Thilachium paradoxum Gilg
- Thilachium pouponii Aubrév. & Pellegr.
- Thilachium roseomaculatum Y.B.Harv. & Vollesen
- Thilachium seyrigii Hadj-Moust.
- Thilachium sumangui Bojer
- Thilachium thomasii Gilg
