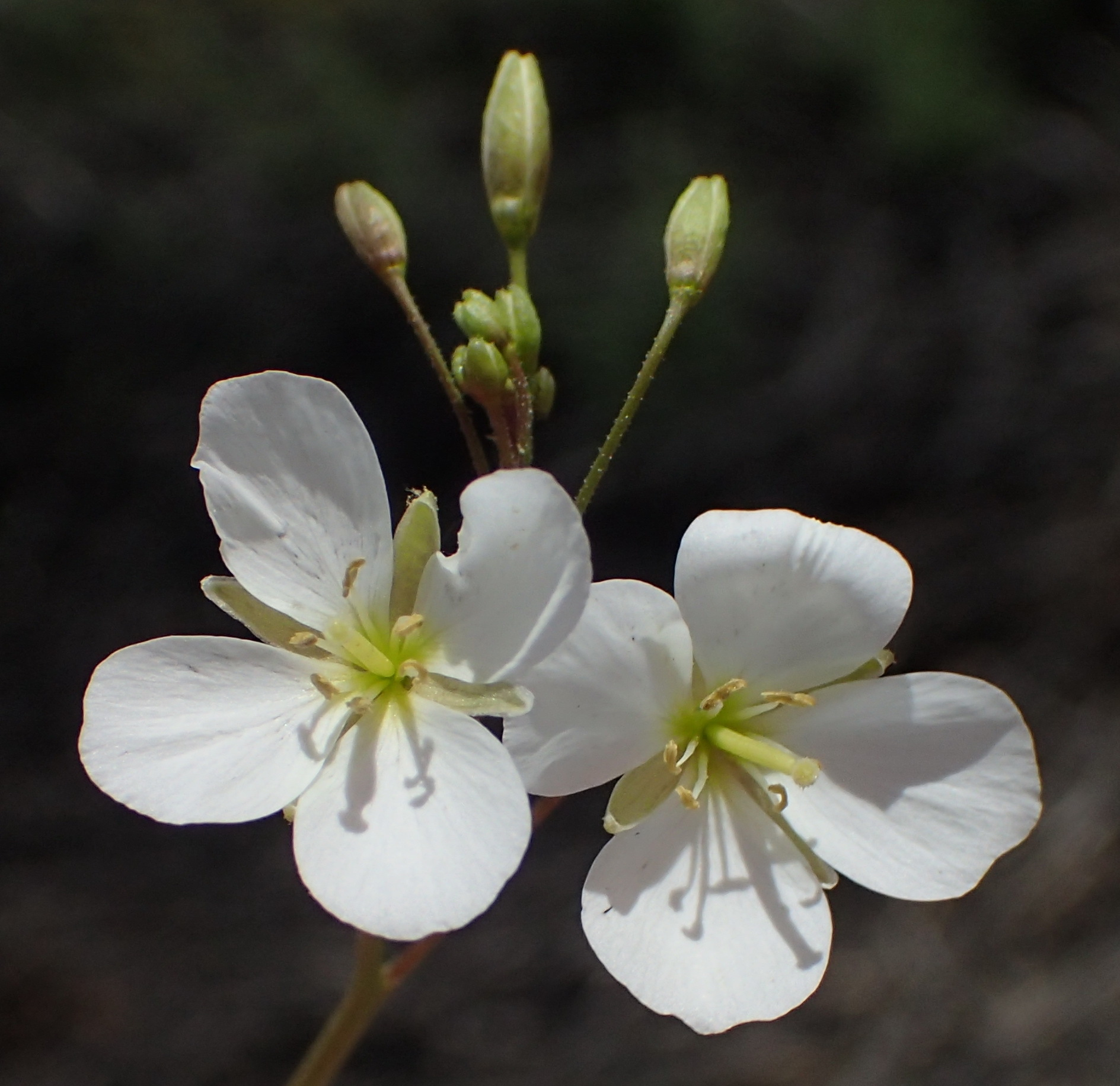

Conservation status
- Least Concern (SANBI Red List)

Scientific classification
- Kingdom: Plantae
- Clade: Tracheophytes
- Clade: Angiosperms
- Clade: Eudicots
- Clade: Rosids
- Order: Brassicales
- Family: Brassicaceae
- Genus: Heliophila
- Species: H. variabilis

Binomial name
- Heliophila variabilis Burch. ex DC.

Synonyms
- Heliophila carifolia Schltr.; Heliophila monticola Sond.

= Heliophila variabilis =

Flowering plant found in the Cape Provinces

Heliophila variabilis is a species of flowering plant in the genus Heliophila.

== Distribution ==
Heliophila variabilis is endemic to the Cape Provinces of South Africa, and is found from the Richtersveld through Namaqualand to the Pakhuis Mountains and Laingsburg.

== Conservation status ==
Heliophila variabilis is classified as Least Concern.
