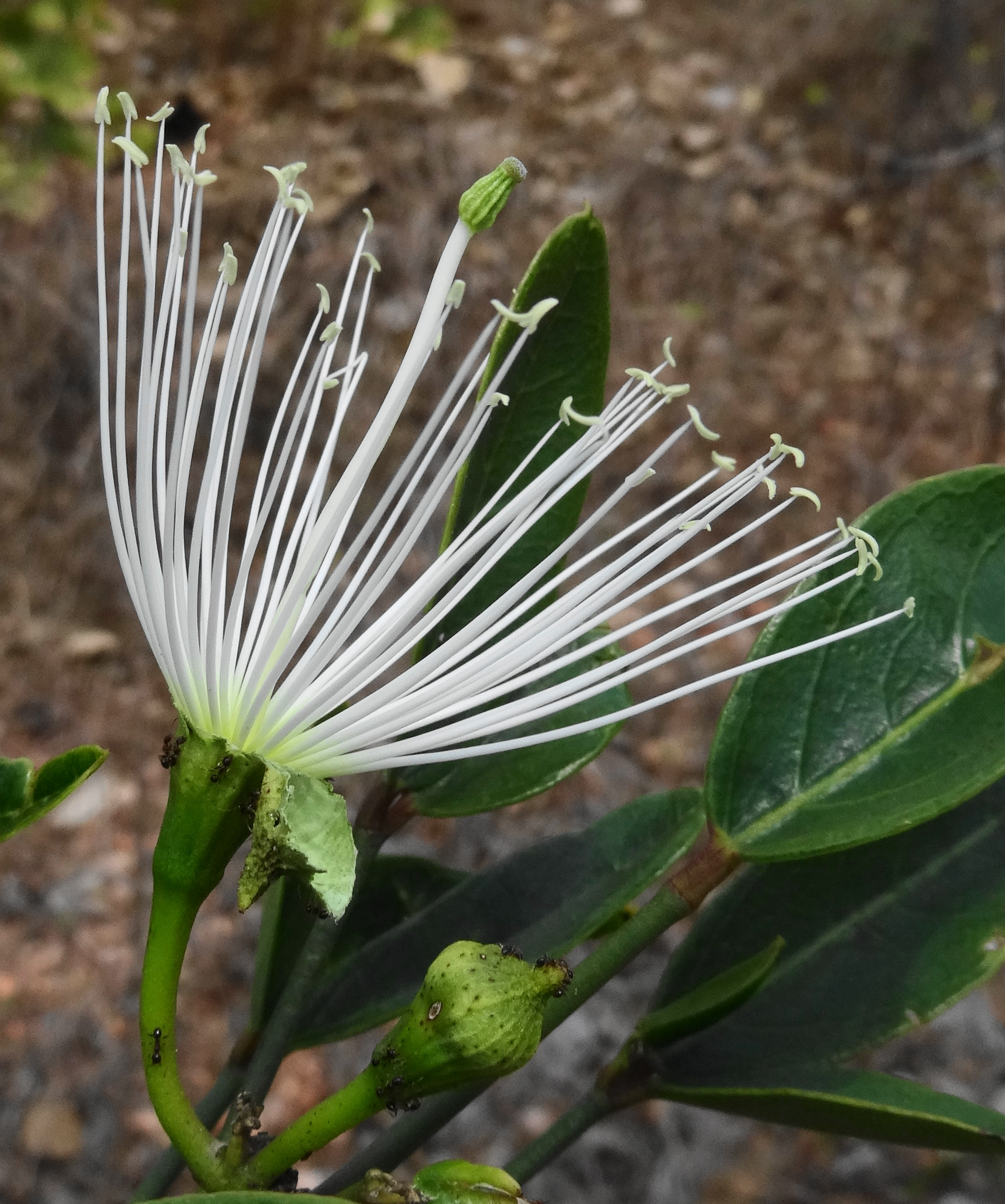

Conservation status
- Least Concern (IUCN 3.1)

Scientific classification
- Kingdom: Plantae
- Clade: Tracheophytes
- Clade: Angiosperms
- Clade: Eudicots
- Clade: Rosids
- Order: Brassicales
- Family: Capparaceae
- Genus: Thilachium
- Species: T. africanum

Binomial name
- Thilachium africanum Lour.

Synonyms
- Thilachium ovalifolium Juss.; Ritchiea langii Oberm.; Thilachium querimbense Klotzsch; Thilachium verrucosum Klotzsch

= Thilachium africanum =

Species of plant

Thilachium africanum is a species of flowering plant in the family Capparaceae. This shrub or small tree is native to Eswatini, Kenya, KwaZulu-Natal, Madagascar, Malawi, Mozambique, the Northern Provinces, Tanzania, and Zimbabwe.

== Description ==
The species grows up to 7 meters tall with tuberous roots; branches are brown or grey and lenticellate. Leaves: simple or 3-foliate; leaflets obovate to elliptic in outline and with a leathery surface, the leaflets are about 3-9 cm long and 1-5 cm wide, apex is obtuse to rounded while base is cuneate to rounded. Inflorescence is terminal or axillary raceme like, white and green with spreading and wavy stamens. Fruit is cucumber like in shape, ellipsoid and up to 6 cm long and contains numerous seeds.

== Distribution ==
Occurs in deciduous forests, opens woodland and riverine forests of Eastern Africa and in thickets.

== Uses ==
Extracts of the species are used in preparations to ease pain, bark extracts are used to treat snake bites and diarrhoea among the Samburu people of Kenya. The tuberous roots are boiled and then drained a few times to reduce toxicity.
