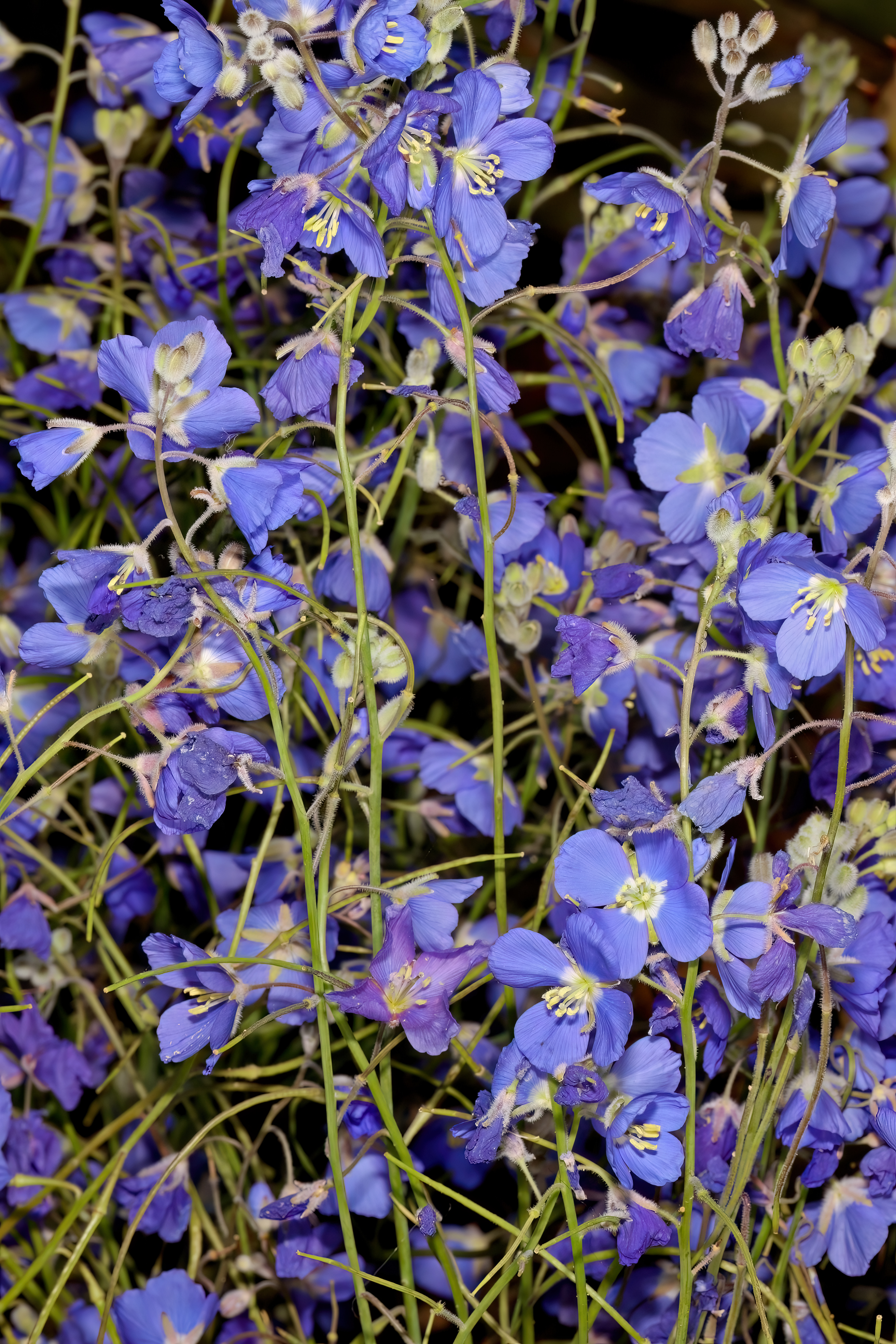

Scientific classification
- Kingdom: Plantae
- Clade: Tracheophytes
- Clade: Angiosperms
- Clade: Eudicots
- Clade: Rosids
- Order: Brassicales
- Family: Brassicaceae
- Genus: Heliophila
- Species: H. africana

Binomial name
- Heliophila africana (L.) Marais

Synonyms
- Cheiranthus africanus L.; Heliophila arabioides Sims; Heliophila coronopifolia Thunb.; Heliophila divaricata Eckl. & Zeyh.; Heliophila divaricata Eckl. & Zeyh. ex Sond.; Heliophila frutescens Lam.; Heliophila incana Thunb.; Heliophila incisa DC.; Heliophila pilosa Lam.; Heliophila pilosa var. digitata Sond.; Heliophila pilosa var. incisa DC.; Heliophila rostrata C.Presl; Heliophila stricta Sims; Heliophila trichincstyla E.Phillips; Heliophila trichinostyla E.Phillips; Orthoselis pilosa (Lam.) Spach; Pachystylum glabrum Eckl. & Zeyh.

= Heliophila africana =

South African plant species

Heliophila africana, the African sunspurge or little blue mouth, is a species of plant from South Africa.

== Description ==
This annual herb grows up to 135 cm (53 in) tall. It is most commonly 60–70 cm (24–28 in) and may be sparely branched. The leaves are lance shaped and are sometimes toothed. They lack stipules. They grow to be up to 13 cm (5.1 in) long and sometimes have lobes. The lower leaves grow on stalks, while the upper leaves are stalkless.

Flowers, which are blue or mauve in colour, are most common between August and October. They have four round petals with basal appendages surrounding a white center and a yellow stamen. While one appendage per petal is most common, they may rarely have two. They contain 20-52 ovules. The flowers are only open when it is warm, and will close when the environment cools.

The fruits are liner. They are 13–100 mm (0.51–3.94 in) long. They are flat or slightly rounded in cross-section with straight margins and 3-nerved valves although rare 5-valved specimens have been found). The seeds are subcircular or a broad oblong in shape and are 1.7–2.3 mm (0.067–0.091 in) long.

== Distribution and habitat ==
This species is endemic to South Africa. It is found between Namaqualand and Swellendam, although it is most common between the Cape Peninsula and Clanwilliam. It prefers sandy flats, where it grows between bushes and rocks.

== Chemistry ==
Fatty acids make up approximately a third of the seed's dry weight for this species. Approximately 41% of this is made up of very-long-chain fatty acids. Linoleic acid makes up around 22% of the seed fatty acids. The relatively high levels of nervonic acid and lower levels of erucic acid may make this species one of commercial interest.
