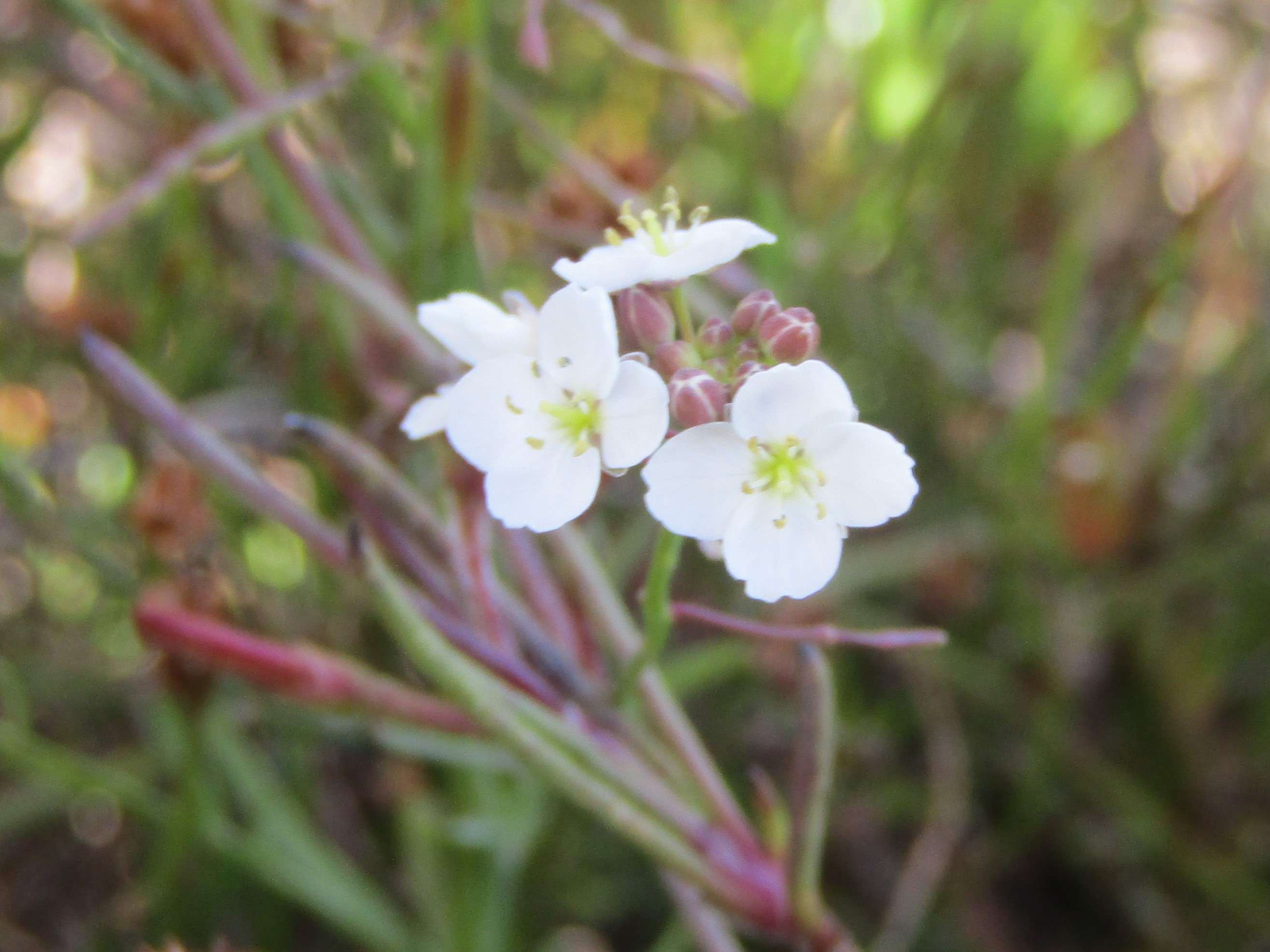

Scientific classification
- Kingdom: Plantae
- Clade: Tracheophytes
- Clade: Angiosperms
- Clade: Eudicots
- Clade: Rosids
- Order: Brassicales
- Family: Brassicaceae
- Genus: Heliophila
- Species: H. pusilla

Binomial name
- Heliophila pusilla L.f.

Synonyms
- Ormiscus pusillus (L.f.) Eckl. & Zeyh. (1835)

= Heliophila pusilla =

South African plant species

Heliophila pusilla, the dainty sunspurge, is a species of plant in family Brassicaceae. It is endemic to the Cape Provinces of South Africa.

== Description ==
This slender annual grows up to 30 cm (12 in) tall. The hairless stems are soft and wiry or flaccid. The leaves are thread-like or lance shaped, with the widest portion near the tip. They are 5–35 mm (0.20–1.38 in) long and 3–15 mm (0.12–0.59 in) wide.

Flowers are present between August and October, forming dense racemes. They range from white to mauve in colour. The petals, which range from 2 to 6 mm (0.079 to 0.236 in) in length, sometimes have basal appendages. They have 3-12 ovules.

The fruits have a submoniliform shape and are 5–18 mm (0.20–0.71 in) long. The bead-like structures are either continuous or joined by narrow waists.

== Subspecies and varieties ==
Four subspecies and varieties are accepted:

- Heliophila pusilla var. lanceolata (Adamson) Marais
- Heliophila pusilla subsp. macrosperma (Marais) Al-Shehbaz
- Heliophila pusilla subsp. pusilla
- Heliophila pusilla var. setacea (Schltr.) Marais

== Distribution and habitat ==
The dainty sunspurge is found growing between the Kouebokkeveld Mountains and De hoop in South Africa. It has also been introduced in Australia. It prefers clay soils.

== Conservation ==
Although the species as a whole is considered to be of least concern, Heliophila pusilla var. lanceolata is considered to be rare. It is found in damp, sheltered areas on south- and west-facing slopes on Karbonkelberg, Chapman's Peak, and the Noordhoek Mountains.
