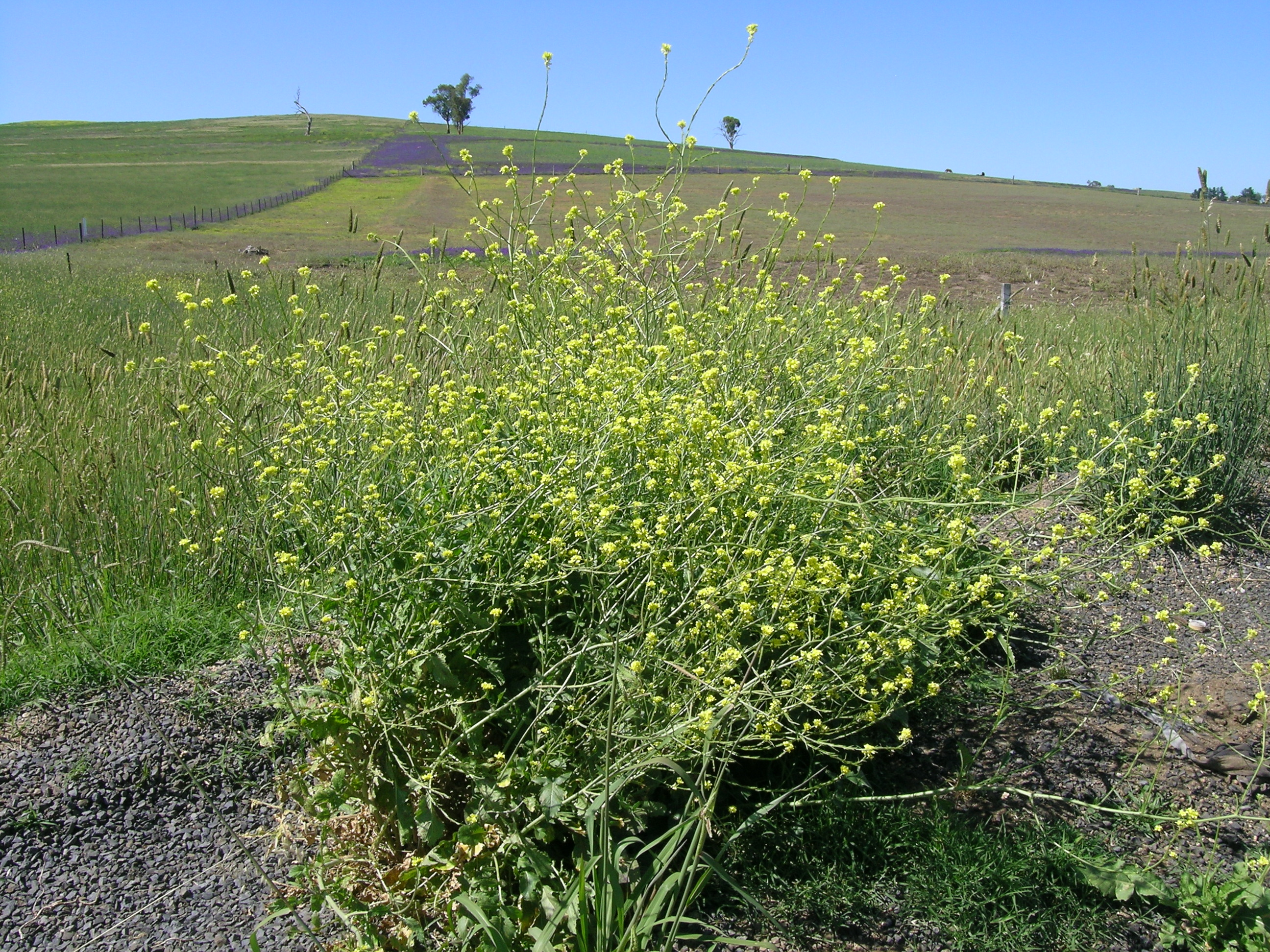

Scientific classification
- Kingdom: Plantae
- Clade: Tracheophytes
- Clade: Angiosperms
- Clade: Eudicots
- Clade: Rosids
- Order: Brassicales
- Family: Brassicaceae
- Genus: Hirschfeldia; Moench
- Species: H. incana

Binomial name
- Hirschfeldia incana (L.) Lagr.-Foss.

Subspecies
- 4, see text

Synonyms
- List: Strangalis Dulac; Brassica adpressa (Moench) Boiss.; Brassica incana (L.) Maly; Brassica nigra var. incana (L.) Dosch & J.Scriba; Erucastrum incanum (L.) W.D.J.Koch; Hirschfeldia adpressa Moench; Raphanus incanus (L.) Crantz; Sinapis adpressa (Moench) Schloss. & Vuk.; Sinapis incana L. (1755) (basionym); Sisymbrium incanum (L.) Prantl; Strangalis adpressa (Moench) Dulac

= Hirschfeldia =

Genus of flowering plants

Hirschfeldia incana (formerly Brassica geniculata) is a species of flowering plant in the mustard family known by many common names, including shortpod mustard, buchanweed, hoary mustard and Mediterranean mustard. It is the only species in the monotypic genus Hirschfeldia, which is closely related to Brassica. The species is native to the Mediterranean Basin but it can be found in many parts of the world as an introduced species and often a very abundant noxious weed. This mustard is very similar in appearance to black mustard, but is generally shorter. It forms a wide basal rosette of lobed leaves which lie flat on the ground, and it keeps its leaves while flowering. Its stem and foliage have soft white hairs. Unlike black mustard, H. incana is a perennial plant.

Its leaves are edible and traditionally were used in some areas as a leaf vegetable.

== Subspecies ==
Four subspecies are accepted.

- Hirschfeldia incana subsp. consobrina (Pomel) Maire
- Hirschfeldia incana subsp. geniculata (Desf.) Tzvelev
- Hirschfeldia incana subsp. incana
- Hirschfeldia incana subsp. incrassata (Thell.) Gómez-Campo
