= Aplanodes (plant) =

Scientific classification
- Kingdom: Plantae
- Clade: Tracheophytes
- Clade: Angiosperms
- Clade: Eudicots
- Clade: Rosids
- Order: Brassicales
- Family: Brassicaceae
- Subfamily: Brassicoideae
- Supertribe: Camelinodae
- Tribe: Cardamineae
- Genus: Aplanodes; Marais

Species
- Aplanodes doidgeana Marais; Aplanodes sisymbrioides (Schltr.) Marais

Genus of flowering plants

Aplanodes is a genus of flowering plants in the family Brassicaceae. It includes two species native to South Africa (the Cape Provinces and KwaZulu-Natal) and Lesotho.

- Aplanodes doidgeana Marais
- Aplanodes sisymbrioides (Schltr.) Marais
