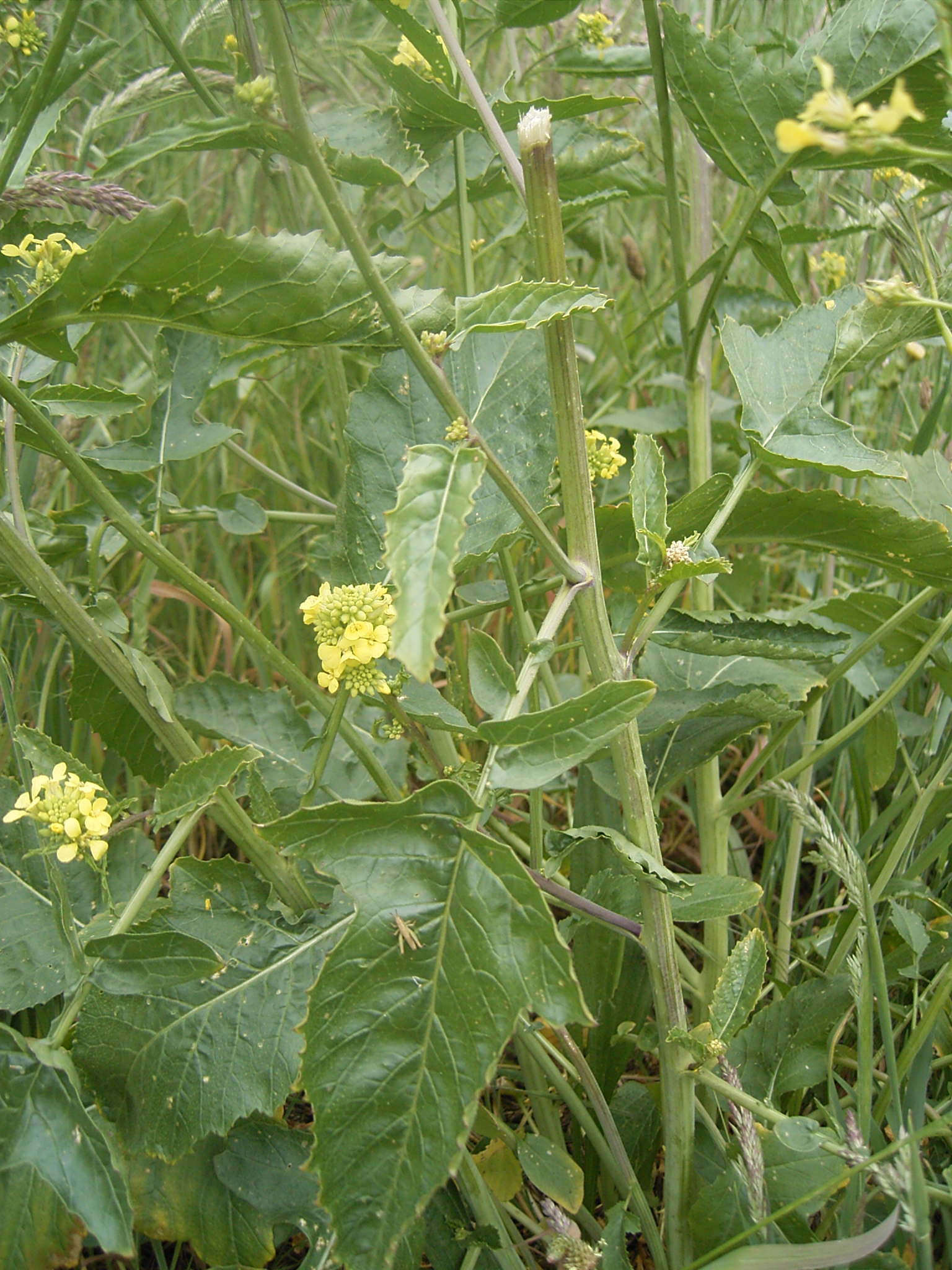

Scientific classification
- Kingdom: Plantae
- Clade: Embryophytes
- Clade: Tracheophytes
- Clade: Spermatophytes
- Clade: Angiosperms
- Clade: Eudicots
- Clade: Rosids
- Order: Brassicales
- Family: Brassicaceae
- Genus: Rapistrum
- Species: R. rugosum

Binomial name
- Rapistrum rugosum (L.) All.

= Rapistrum rugosum =

Species of flowering plant

Rapistrum rugosum is a species of flowering plant in the mustard family commonly known as bastard cabbage or annual bastard cabbage, as well as "common giant mustard", "turnipweed", "ball mustard", "wild turnip", "wild rape", or "tall mustard-weed". It is native to parts of Eurasia and Africa, but is present throughout the world as an introduced species and a common weed. It is an invasive species in many areas. It is an annual herb producing an erect stem reaching up to about a meter tall. The leaves are variable in shape and size and the proximal blades are generally cut into lobes or divided into leaflets. The herbage is coated in rough hairs. The inflorescence is a raceme of flowers with dark-veined yellow petals that are each under a centimeter long. The fruit is a knoblike spherical ribbed silique borne on a long pedicel with a widened area where it joins the fruit. It grows mainly in temperate areas. It is used as animal food, as a poison, for medicine, and for food.

== Gallery ==
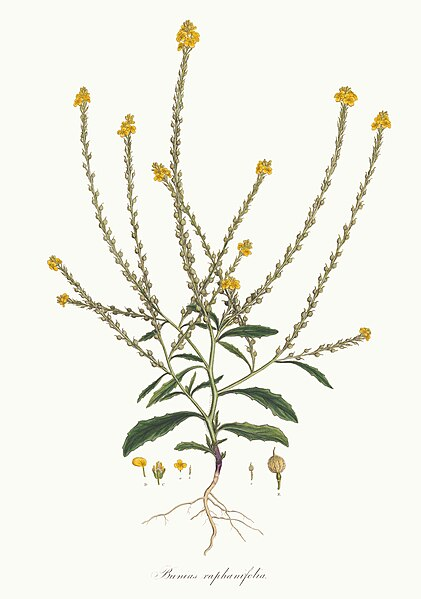
Botanical drawing

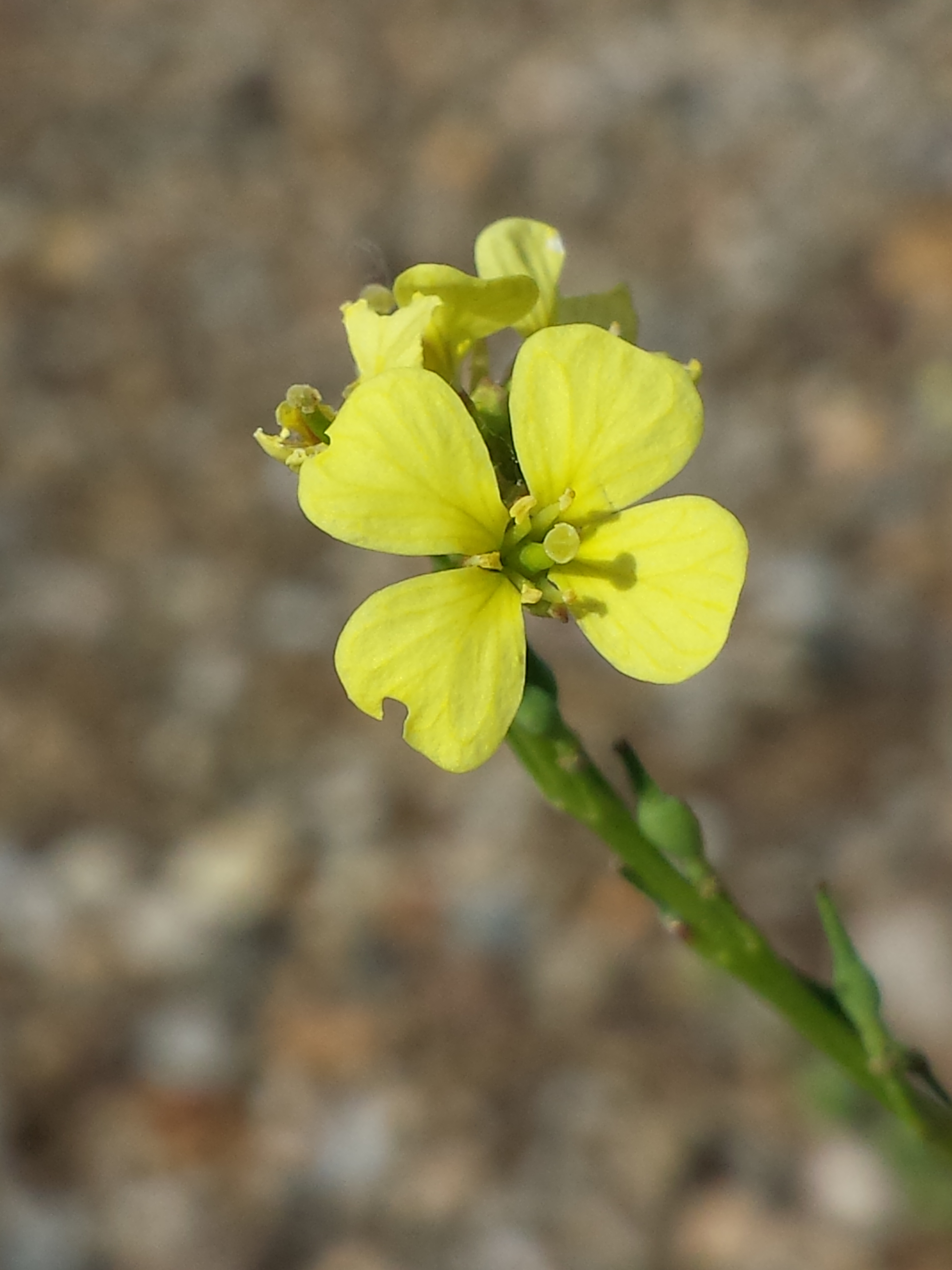
Closeup of a flower

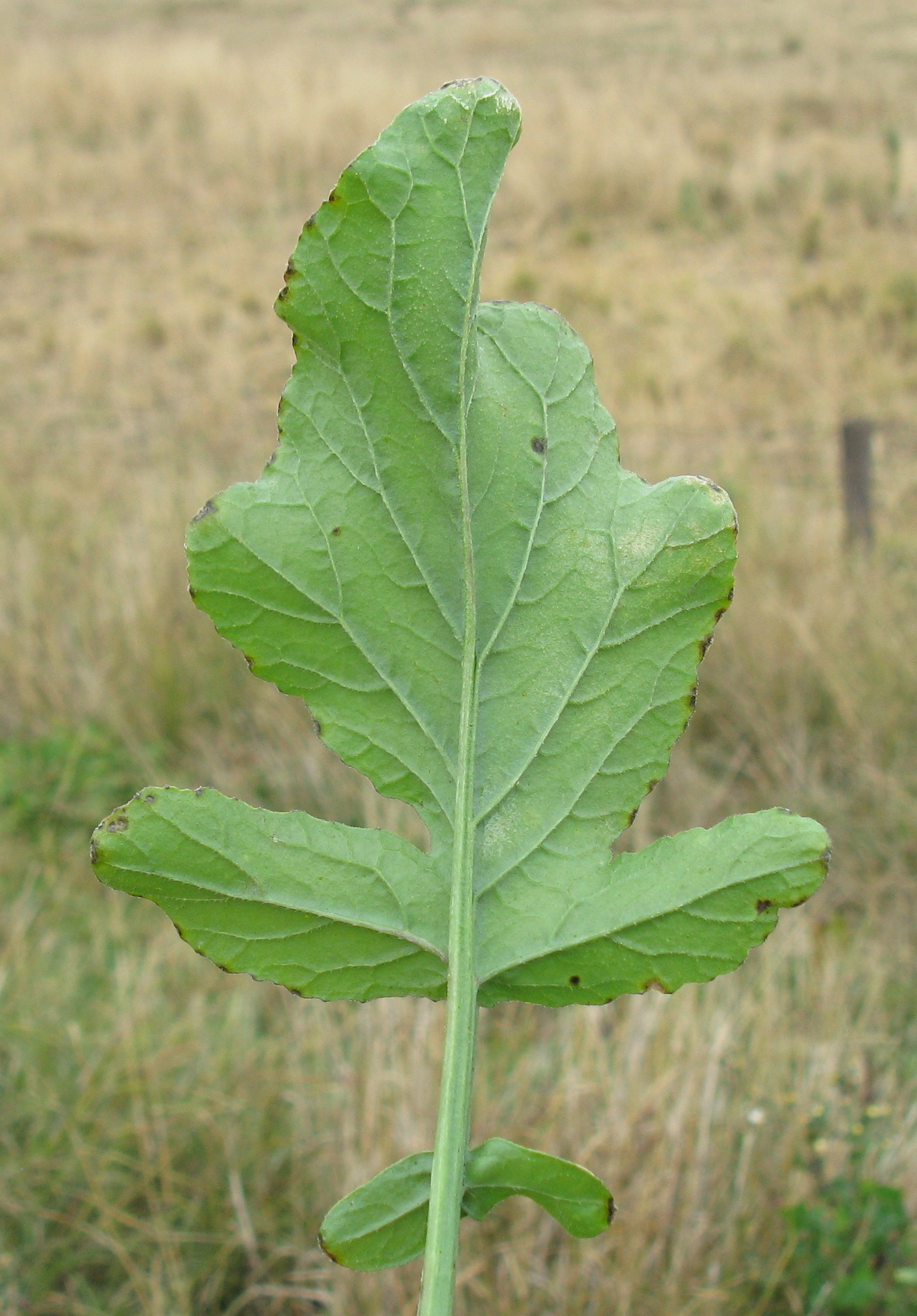
Closeup of a leaf
