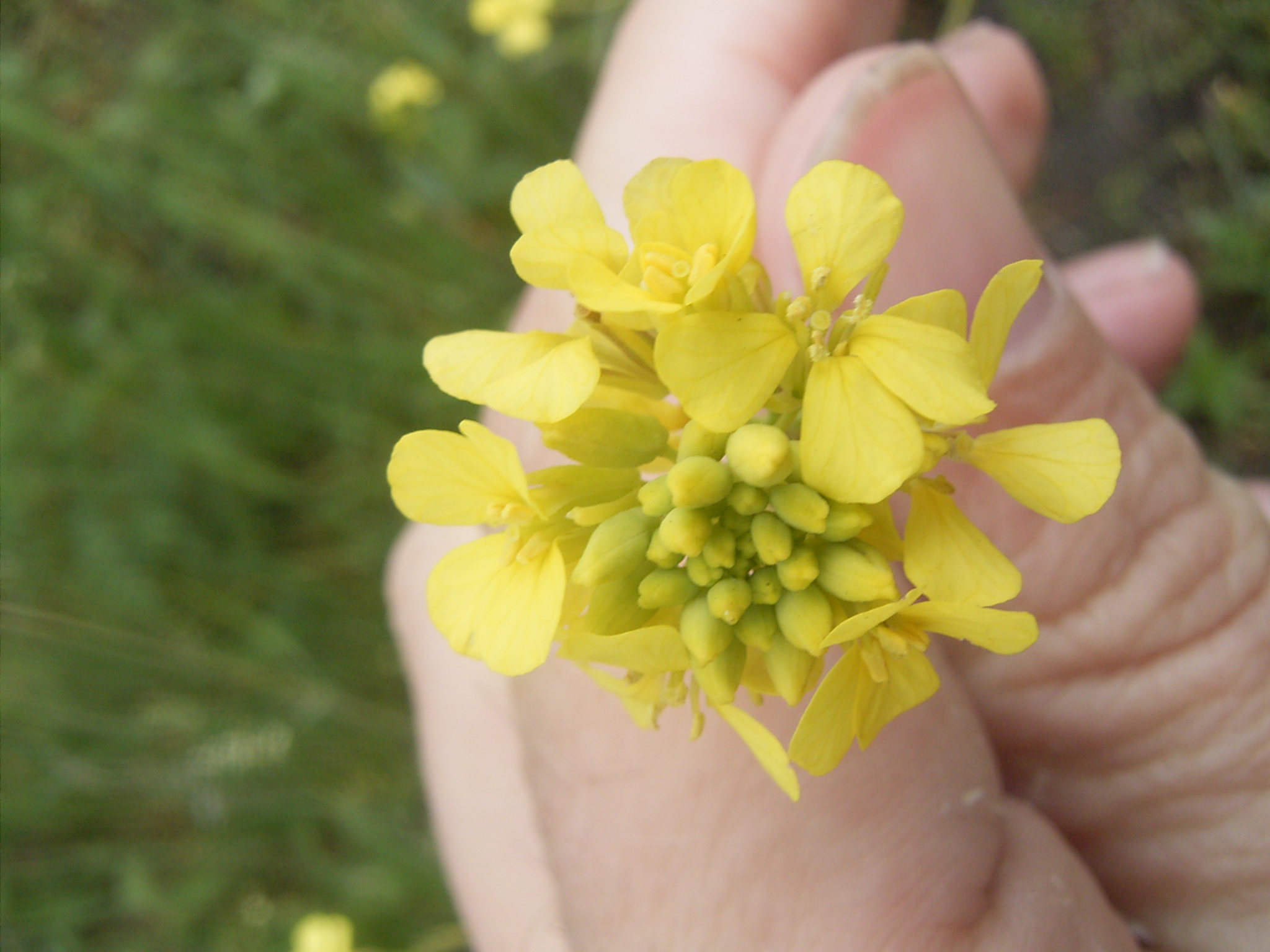
- Rapistrum rugosum

Scientific classification
- Kingdom: Plantae
- Clade: Tracheophytes
- Clade: Angiosperms
- Clade: Eudicots
- Clade: Rosids
- Order: Brassicales
- Family: Brassicaceae
- Genus: Rapistrum; Crantz

Species
- Rapistrum perenne (L.) All; Rapistrum rugosum (L.) All

Synonyms
- Arthrolobus Andrz. ex DC.; Schrankia Medik.

= Rapistrum =

Genus of flowering plants

Rapistrum, the bastard cabbages, is a genus of the family Brassicaceae with a distinctive cross like arrangement of its petals. It is also known as wild-turnip or turnipweed. Species of Rapistrum are annual to perennials (Lifespan from 1 to 2 or more years). The yellow petals are accompanied by sepals that stand vertically at near right angles (erecto-patent). Leaf shape and arrangement varies from rough toothed (dentate) to a configuration of opposingly lobed pairs along the plant stalk, pinnately lobed.

== Etymology ==
The word "Rapistrum" is formed from the Latin rapa ("turnip") and -astrum, ("incomplete resemblance").

== Fruit ==
The genus Rapistrum has a characteristic fruit comprising two segments, one distal and one proximal:

- The distal (upper division) is the part of the fruit farthest away from the point of attachment. The distal is endowed with a ribbed spheroid base (globose) that tapers to form a narrowed projection. It holds a single seed.
- The proximal (lower division) is the part of the fruit nearest to the point of attachment. Possesses a more uniform narrower shape compared to the distal above, giving the fruit a waist. It holds a maximum of three seeds, more commonly none or one.

The fruit varies between species in the genus. The distal of R. rugosum is strongly ribbed and narrows to form a beak whereas R. perenne is comparatively less wrinkled and ends with a style that stubbornly resists detachment, 'a persistent style'.

When ripe the distal breaks away in an across-wise fashion, breaking transversely.

== Bibliography ==
- Stace, C. (1999), Field flora of the British Isles, Cambridge: Cambridge University Press, ISBN 0-521-65315-0.
- Streeter, D. (1983), The wild flowers of the British Isles, London: Midsummer Books Ltd., ISBN 1-900732-03-3.
