= E. maculata =

E. maculata may refer to:

- Ectoedemia maculata, a pigmy moth
- Elachista maculata, a gelechioid moth
- Eloeophila maculata, a crane fly
- Emarginula maculata, a slit limpet
- Empis maculata, a dance fly
- Ephippithyta maculata, a bush cricket
- Ereca maculata, a daddy longlegs
- Eremophila maculata, a shrub native to Australia
- Ethmia maculata, an Asian moth
- Eucalyptus maculata, a tree endemic to Australia
- Eucoila maculata, a tiny wasp
- Euphorbia maculata, a plant native to North America
- Eupoa maculata, a jumping spider
- Eupromerella maculata, a longhorn beetle
- Eurydema maculata, a shield bug
- Eutane maculata, an Australian moth
- Euxesta maculata, a picture-winged fly
- Evarcha maculata, a jumping spider
