= Weeping Myall Woodlands =

Australian endangered ecological community

The Weeping Myall Woodlands is an endangered ecological community, under the EPBC Act of the Commonwealth of Australia. It is found in inland Queensland and inland New South Wales, on alluvial plains west of the Great Dividing Range. It takes its name from Acacia pendula, the weeping myall.

The Weeping Myall woodlands ecological community in New South Wales has been named as the Myall Woodland in the Darling Riverine Plains, Brigalow Belt South, Cobar Peneplain, Murray-Darling Depression, Riverina and NSW South Western Slopes bioregions.

== Conservation status ==
This ecological community has been listed as endangered under the Commonwealth EPBC Act since 7 January 2009. The key threats are clearing and ongoing degradation since this ecological community occurs on highly fertile and arable soils. Other threats are overgrazing and weed invasion.

In New South Wales it is also listed as an endangered ecological community, first under the NSW Threatened Species Conservation Act 1995 and now under the Biodiversity Act of 2016.

== Distribution ==
It occurs in the IBRA regions of Riverina, NSW South Western Slopes, Darling Riverine Plains, Brigalow Belt South, Brigalow Belt North, Murray-Darling Depression, Nandewar and Cobar Peneplain, in small pockets.

== Species listed ==
Species listed as occurring in the NSW EEC Weeping Myall Woodlands

1. Acacia homalophylla
2. Acacia oswaldii
3. Acacia pendula
4. Acacia victoriae
5. Alectryon oleifolius
6. Alternanthera denticulata
7. Amaranthus macrocarpus
8. Amyema quandang
9. Apophyllum anomalum
10. Arthropodium minus
11. Asperula conferta
12. Astrebla lappacea
13. Astrebla pectinata
14. Atalaya hemiglauca
15. Atriplex leptocarpa
16. Atriplex nummularia
17. Atriplex semibaccata
18. Atriplex spinibractea
19. Austrodanthonia caespitosa
20. Austrodanthonia setacea
21. Austrostipa aristiglumis
22. Austrostipa scabra
23. Boerhavia dominii
24. Brachyscome lineariloba
25. Calocephalus sonderi
26. Calotis hispidula
27. Calotis scabiosifolia
28. Capparis lasiantha
29. Capparis mitchellii
30. Casuarina cristata
31. Centipeda cunninghamii
32. Chloris truncata
33. Chrysocephalum apiculatum
34. Convolvulus erubescens
35. Dactyloctenium radulans
36. Daucus glochidiatus
37. Dichanthium sericeum
38. Diplachne fusca
39. Einadia nutans
40. Enchylaena tomentosa
41. Enteropogon acicularis
42. Eragrostis parviflora
43. Eremophila bignoniiflora
44. Eremophila maculata
45. Eriochloa sp.
46. Exocarpos aphyllus
47. Goodenia glauca
48. Goodenia pusilliflora
49. Homopholis proluta
50. Hypoxis pusilla
51. Iseilema membranaceum
52. Isoetopsis graminifolia
53. Ixiolaena leptolepis
54. Maireana aphylla
55. Maireana ciliata
56. Maireana decalvans
57. Maireana excavata
58. Maireana pentagona
59. Marsilea drummondii
60. Myoporum montanum
61. Myriocephalus rhizocephalus
62. Nitraria billardierei
63. Oxalis perennans
64. Panicum decompositum
65. Plantago varia (complex)
66. Poa fordeana
67. Portulaca oleracea
68. Rhagodia spinescens
69. Rhodanthe corymbiflora
70. Rhodanthe floribunda
71. Rhodanthe pygmaea
72. Salsola kali
73. Scerolaena brachyptera
74. Sclerolaena muricata
75. Sclerolaena stelligera
76. Sida corrugata
77. Sida trichopoda
78. Solanum esuriale
79. Sporobolus caroli
80. Swainsona procumbens
81. Teucrium racemosum
82. Tribulus terrestris
83. Triptilodiscus pygmaeus
84. Vittadinia cuneata

Plants found and photographed NSW Weeping Myall Woodlands

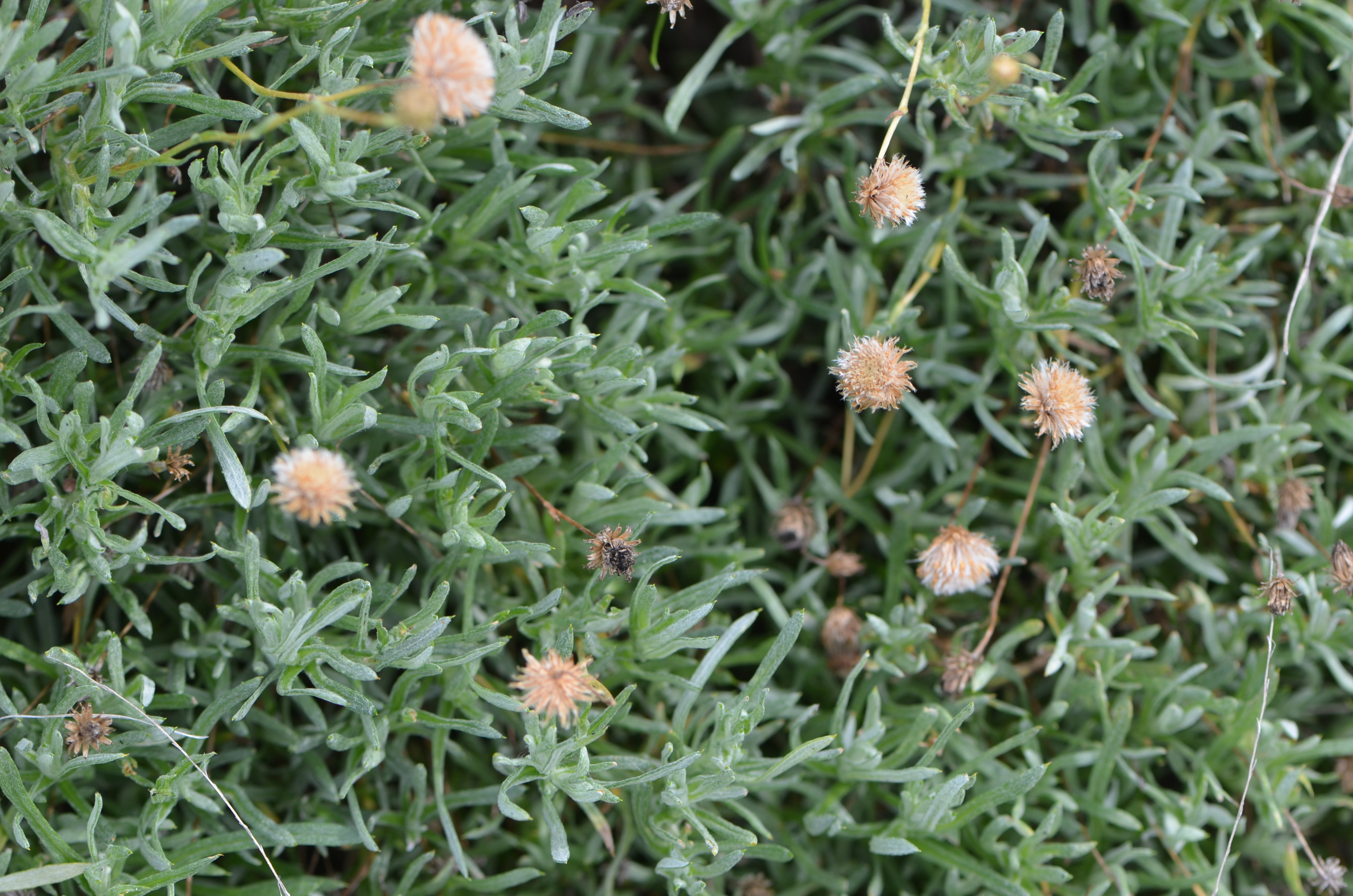
Leiocarpa panaetioides

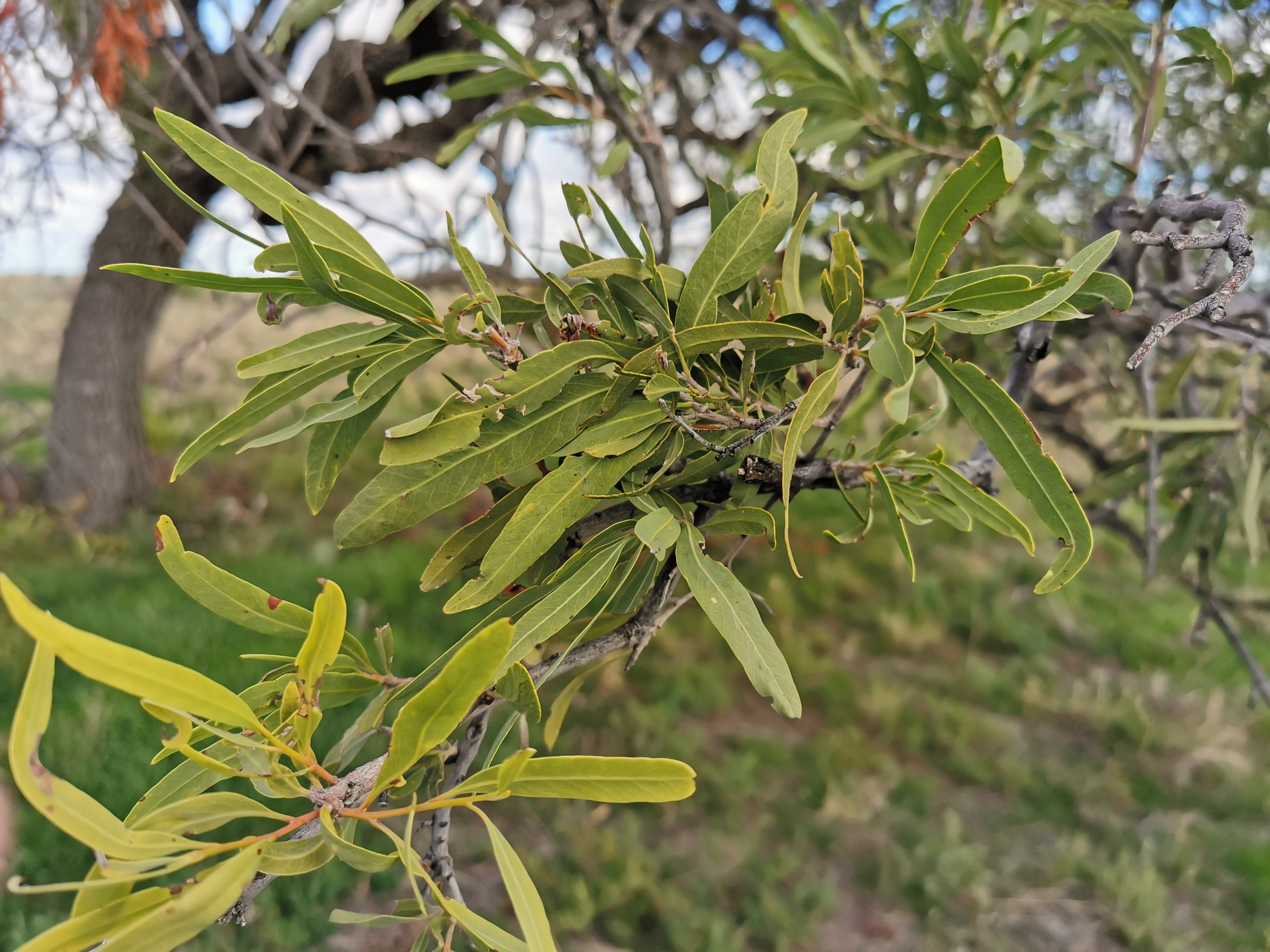
Alectryon oleifolius

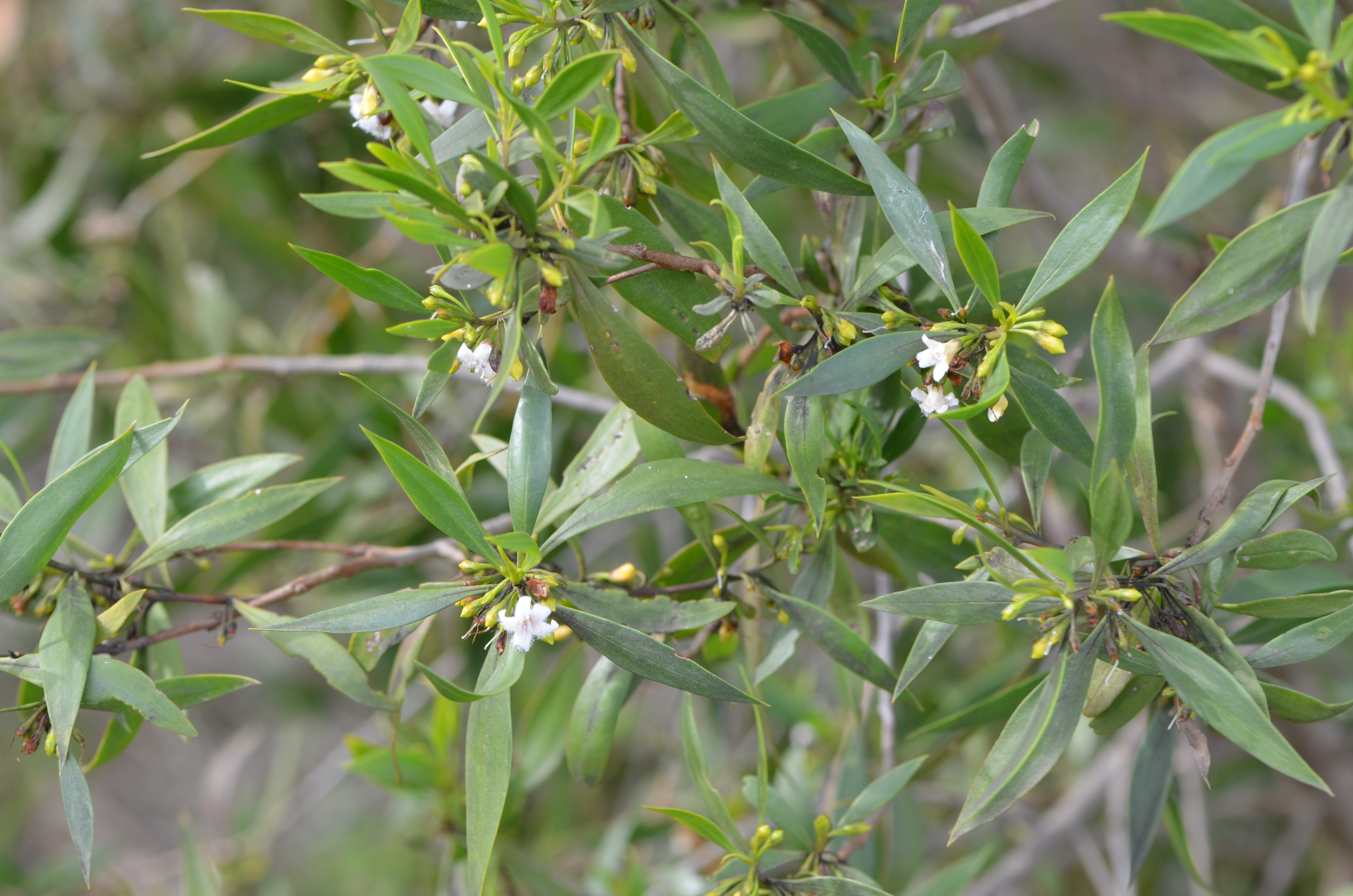
Myoporum montanum

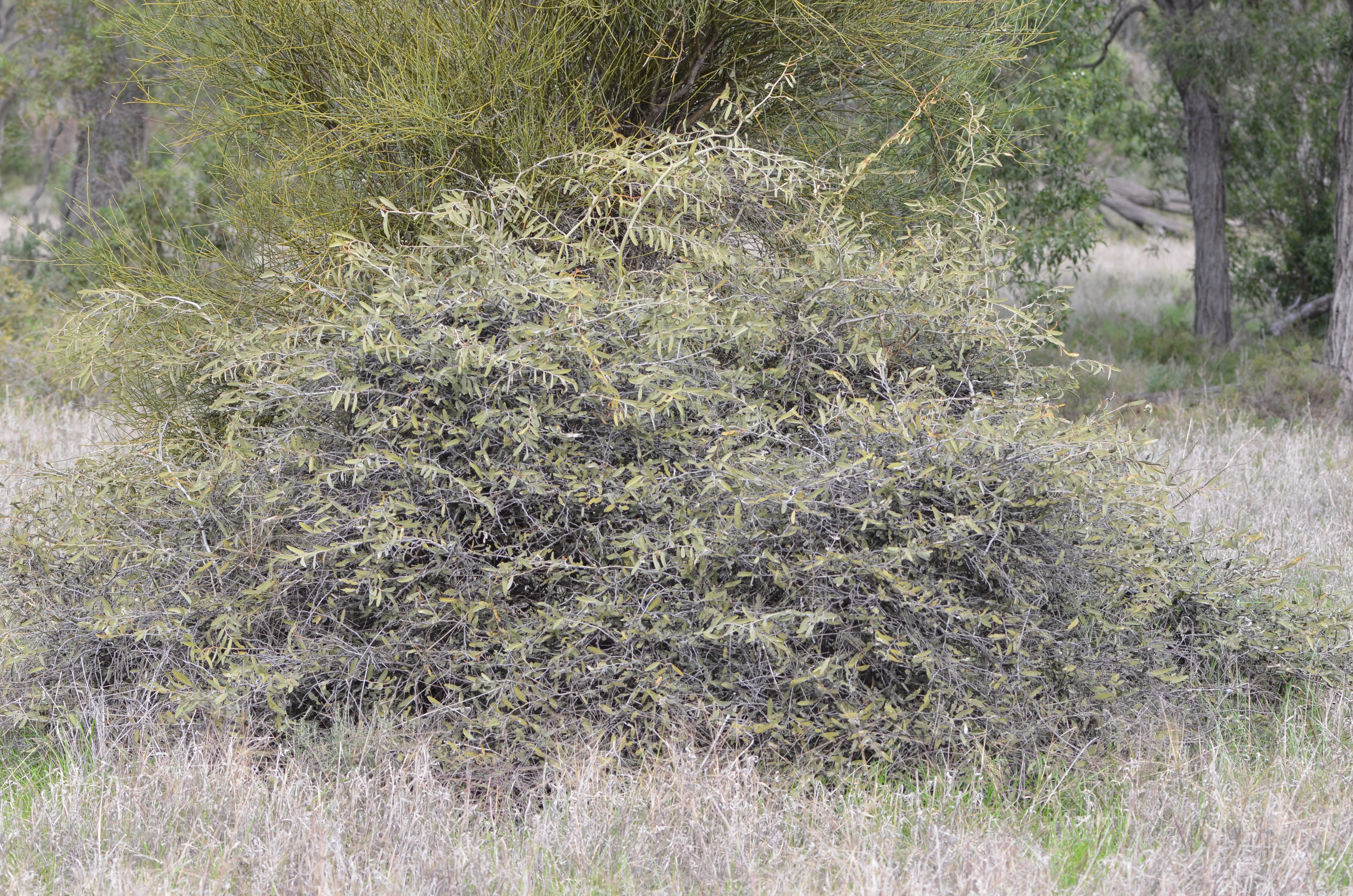
Capparis lasiantha in front of Warrior Bush, Apophylla anomalum, and both under a weeping myall, Acacia pendula.

== Cases in NSW involving Weeping Myall Woodlands ==
1. Plath v Hunter Valley Property Management Pty Limited - NSW Caselaw (concerned the destruction of a Weeping Myall community in the Hunter Valley)
2. Chief Executive, Office of Environment and Heritage v Traikaero Pty Ltd; Chief Executive, Office of Environment and Heritage v Woods - NSW Caselaw
