= List of endangered ecological communities in New South Wales =

This list of endangered ecological communities in New South Wales (or EECs in NSW) has been compiled from the indices of final determinations (made by the NSW Scientific Committee, under the TSC Act and Biodiversity Acts), and available at the NSW Office of Environment and Heritage's website. Determinations prior to 25 August 2017 refer to the Threatened Species Conservation Act of 1995 now replaced by the Biodiversity Conservation Act of 2016.

Note that:

- This list may be incomplete.
- Where a link has not been supplied to a final (FD) or preliminary (PD) determination, the link given was broken (or alternatively, if the community was relisted at a later time, no link may have been given).
- CEEC indicates a critically endangered ecological community.
- VEC indicates a vulnerable ecological community.
- ma after the ecological community designation indicates that the determination is a minor amendment.

== 2016 ==
Final determinations: ecological communities
Ecological community	FD/PD	Date gazetted
Snowpatch Feldmark in the Australian Alps Bioregion	CEEC	27 April 2018
Eastern Suburbs Banksia Scrub in the Sydney Basin Bioregion	CEEC	1 December 2017
Robertson Basalt Tall Open-forest in the Sydney Basin and South Eastern Highlands Bioregions	CEEC	16 December 2016

== 2013-2015 ==
Final determinations: ecological communities
Ecological community	FD/PD	Date gazetted
Agnes Banks Woodland in the Sydney Basin Bioregion	CEEC	22 May 2015
Artesian Springs Ecological Community in the Great Artesian Basin	CEEC	22 May 2015
Blue Mountains Basalt Forest in the Sydney Basin Bioregion	EEC	20 March 2015
Coolac-Tumut Serpentinite Shrubby Woodland in the NSW South Western Slopes and South Eastern Highlands Bioregions	EEC	22 May 2015
Elderslie Banksia Scrub Forest in the Sydney Basin Bioregion	CEEC	20 March 2015
Hygrocybeae community of Lane Cove Bushland Park in the Sydney Basin Bioregion	CEEC	21 February 2014
Mount Kaputar high elevation and dry rainforest land snail and slug community in the Nandewar and Brigalow Belt South Bioregions	EEC	20 December 2013
New England Peppermint (Eucalyptus nova-anglica) Woodland on Basalts and Sediments in the New England Tableland Bioregion	CEEC	27 September 2013
Pittwater and Wagstaffe Spotted Gum Forest in the Sydney Basin Bioregion pdf	EEC	22 February 2013
Shale Sandstone Transition Forest in the Sydney Basin Bioregion	CEEC	28 November 2014
Windswept Feldmark in the Australian Alps Bioregion	CEEC	2 October 2015

== 2011-2012 ==
Final determinations: ecological communities
Ecological community	FD/PD	Date gazetted
Agnes Banks Woodland in the Sydney Basin Bioregion	CEEC(ma)	14 October 2011
Araluen Scarp Grassy Forest in the South East Corner Bioregion	EEC(ma)	14 October 2011
Artesian Springs Ecological Community	EEC(ma)	2 December 2011
Allocasuarina luehmannii Woodland in the Riverina and Murray-Darling Depression Bioregions	EEC(ma)	2 December 2011
Bangalay Sand Forest of the Sydney Basin and South East Corner Bioregions	EEC(ma)	8 July 2011
Blue Gum High Forest in the Sydney Basin Bioregion	EEC(ma)	14 October 2011
Blue Mountains Shale Cap Forest in the Sydney Basin Bioregion	EEC(ma)	14 October 2011
Blue Mountains Swamps in the Sydney Basin Bioregion	VEC(ma)	14 October 2011
Brigalow within the Brigalow Belt South, Nandewar and Darling Riverine Plains Bioregions	EEC(ma)	2 December 2011
Brigalow-Gidgee woodland/shrubland in the Mulga Lands and Darling Riverine Plains Bioregions	EEC(ma)	2 December 2011
Brogo Wet Vine Forest in the South East Corner Bioregion	EEC(ma)	14 October 2011
Cadellia pentastylis (Ooline) community in the Nandewar and Brigalow Belt South Bioregions	EEC(ma)	2 December 2011
Carbeen Open Forest community in the Darling Riverine Plains and Brigalow Belt South Bioregions	EEC(ma)	2 December 2011
Carex Sedgeland of the New England Tableland, Nandewar, Brigalow Belt South and NSW North Coast Bioregions	EEC	15 April 2011
Coastal Cypress Pine Forest in the NSW North Coast Bioregion	EEC(ma)	2 December 2011
Coastal Saltmarsh in the NSW North Coast, Sydney Basin and South East Corner Bioregions	EEC(ma)	2 December 2011
Coastal Upland Swamp in the Sydney Basin Bioregion	EEC	9 March 2012
Cooks River/Castlereagh Ironbark Forest in the Sydney Basin Bioregion	EEC(ma)	4 October 2011
Coolibah-Black Box Woodland in the Darling Riverine Plains, Brigalow Belt South, Cobar Peneplain and Mulga Lands Bioregions	EEC	5 October 2012
Dry Rainforest of the South East Forests in the South East Corner Bioregion	EEC(ma)	14 October 2011
Duffys Forest Ecological Community in the Sydney Basin Bioregion	EEC(ma)	14 October 2011
Eastern Suburbs Banksia Scrub in the Sydney Basin Bioregion	EEC(ma)	14 October 2011
Fuzzy Box Woodland on alluvial soils of the South Western Slopes, Darling Riverine Plains and Brigalow Belt South Bioregions	EEC(ma)	2 December 2011
Grey Box-Grey Gum Wet Sclerophyll Forest in the NSW North Coast Bioregion	EEC(ma)	8 July 2011
Gnarled Mossy Cloud Forest on Lord Howe Island	EEC	28 October 2011
Halosarcia lylei low open-shrubland in the Murray Darling Depression Bioregion	EEC(ma)	2 December 2011
Howell Shrublands in the New England Tableland and Nandewar Bioregions	EEC(ma)	2 December 2011
Hunter Floodplain Red Gum Woodland in the NSW North Coast and Sydney Basin Bioregions	EEC(ma)	8 July 2011
Hunter Lowland Redgum Forest in the Sydney Basin and NSW North Coast Bioregions	EEC(ma)	2 December 2011
Hunter Valley Vine Thicket in the NSW North Coast and Sydney Basin Bioregions	EEC(ma)	8 July 2011
Hunter Valley Weeping Myall Woodland of the Sydney Basin Bioregion	EEC(ma)	8 July 2011
Illawarra Lowlands Grassy Woodland in the Sydney Basin Bioregion	EEC(ma)	4 October 2011
Illawarra Subtropical Rainforest in the Sydney Basin Bioregion	EEC(ma)	14 October 2011
Inland Grey Box Woodland in the Riverina, NSW South Western Slopes, Cobar Peneplain, Nandewar and Brigalow Belt South Bioregions	EEC(ma)	8 July 2011
Littoral Rainforest in the New South Wales North Coast, Sydney Basin and South East Corner Bioregions	EEC(ma)	2 December 2011
Lower Hunter Valley Dry Rainforest in the Sydney Basin and NSW North Coast Bioregions	VEC(ma)	14 October 2011
Lowland Grassy Woodland in the South East Corner Bioregion	EEC(ma)	2 December 2011
Lowland Rainforest in the NSW North Coast and Sydney Basin Bioregions	EEC(ma)	2 December 2011
Lowland Rainforest on Floodplain in the NSW North Coast Bioregion	EEC(ma)	2 December 2011
Marsh Club-rush Sedgeland in the Darling Riverine Plains Bioregion	EEC(ma)	2 December 2011
McKies Stringybark/Blackbutt Open Forest in the Nandewar and New England Tableland Bioregions	EEC(ma)	2 December 2011
Melaleuca armillaris Tall Shrubland in the Sydney Basin Bioregion	EEC(ma)	14 October 2011
Milton Ulladulla Subtropical Rainforest in the Sydney Basin Bioregion	EEC(ma)	14 October 2011
Moist Shale Woodland in the Sydney Basin Bioregion	EEC(ma)	14 October 2011
Mount Gibraltar Forest in the Sydney Basin Bioregion	EEC(ma)	14 October 2011
Myall Woodland in the Darling Riverine Plains, Brigalow Belt South, Cobar Peneplain, Murray-Darling Depression, Riverina and NSW South Western Slopes Bioregions	EEC(ma)	8 July 2011
Native Vegetation on Cracking Clay Soils of the Liverpool Plains	EEC(ma)	2 December 2011
New England Peppermint (Eucalyptus nova-anglica) Woodland on Basalts and Sediments in the New England Tableland Bioregion	EEC(ma)	2 December 2011
Newnes Plateau Shrub Swamp in the Sydney Basin Bioregion	EEC(ma)	14 October 2011
Quorrobolong Scribbly Gum Woodland in the Sydney Basin Bioregion	EEC(ma)	14 October 2011
Ribbon Gum-Mountain Gum-Snow Gum Grassy Forest/Woodland of the New England Tableland Bioregion	EEC(ma)	8 July 2011
River-Flat Eucalypt Forest on Coastal floodplains of the NSW North Coast, Sydney Basin and South East Corner Bioregions	EEC(ma)	8 July 2011
Robertson Basalt Tall Open-forest in the Sydney Basin Bioregion	EEC(ma)	14 October 2011
Robertson Rainforest in the Sydney Basin Bioregion	EEC(ma)	14 October 2011
Sandhill Pine Woodland in the Riverina, Murray-Darling Depression and NSW South Western Slopes Bioregions	EEC(ma)	8 July 2011
Semi-evergreen Vine Thicket in the Brigalow Belt South and Nandewar Bioregions	EEC(ma)	2 December 2011
Shale Gravel Transition Forest in the Sydney Basin Bioregion	EEC(ma)	14 October 2011
Southern Highlands Shale Woodlands in the Sydney Basin Bioregion	EEC(ma)	14 October 2011
Southern Sydney sheltered forest on transitional sandstone soils in the Sydney Basin Bioregion	EEC(ma)	8 July 2011
Sun Valley Cabbage Gum Forest in the Sydney Basin Bioregion	CEEC	15 April 2011
Swamp Oak Floodplain Forest of the NSW North Coast, Sydney Basin and South East Corner Bioregions	EEC(ma)	8 July 2011
Swamp Sclerophyll Forest on Coastal Floodplains of the NSW North Coast, Sydney Basin and South East Corner Bioregions	EEC(ma)	8 July 2011
Sydney Freshwater Wetlands in the Sydney Basin Bioregion	EEC(ma)	14 October 2011
Sydney Turpentine-Ironbark Forest	EEC(ma)	2 December 2011
Tableland Basalt Forest in the Sydney Basin and Southern Highlands Bioregions	EEC(ma)	14 October 2011
Tablelands Snow Gum, Black Sallee, Candlebark and Ribbon Gum Grassy Woodland in the South Eastern Highlands, Sydney Basin, South East Corner and NSW South Western Slopes Bioregions	EEC	15 April 2011
Themeda grassland on seacliffs and coastal headlands in the NSW North Coast, Sydney Basin and South East Corner Bioregions	EEC(ma)	2 December 2011
Umina Coastal Sandplain Woodland in the Sydney Basin Bioregion	EEC(ma)	14 October 2011
Upland Wetlands of the Drainage Divide of the New England Tableland Bioregion	EEC(ma)	2 December 2011
Warkworth Sands Woodland in the Sydney Basin Bioregion	EEC(ma)	14 October 2011
Western Sydney Dry Rainforest in the Sydney Basin Bioregion	EEC(ma)	14 October 2011
White Box Yellow Box Blakely's Red Gum Woodland	EEC(ma)	2 December 2011
White Gum Moist Forest in the NSW North Coast Bioregion	EEC(ma)	2 December 2011

== 2008-2010 ==
Final determinations: ecological communities
Ecological community	FD/PD	Date gazetted
Acacia melvillei Shrubland in the Riverina and Murray-Darling Depression bioregions	EEC	04 July 2008
Castlereagh Scribbly Gum Woodland in the Sydney Basin Bioregion	VEC	3 December 2010
Central Hunter Grey Box-Ironbark Woodland in the NSW North Coast and Sydney Basin Bioregions	EEC	12 February 2010
Central Hunter Ironbark-Spotted Gum-Grey Box Forest in the NSW North Coast and Sydney Basin Bioregions	EEC	12 February 2010
Cumberland Plain Woodland in the Sydney Basin Bioregion	CEEC	18 December 2009
Freshwater Wetlands on Coastal Floodplains of the NSW North Coast, Sydney Basin and South East Corner bioregions	EEC(ma)	17 December 2010
Hunter Valley Footslopes Slaty Gum Woodland in the Sydney Basin Bioregion	VEC	12 February 2010
Kincumber Scribbly Gum Forest in the Sydney Basin Bioregion	CEEC	04 July 2008
Lagunaria Swamp Forest on Lord Howe Island	CEEC	13 August 2010
Lower Hunter Spotted Gum-Ironbark Forest in the Sydney Basin Bioregion	EEC(ma)	5 November 2010
Mallee and Mallee-Broombush dominated woodland and shrubland, lacking Triodia, in the NSW South Western Slopes Bioregion	CEEC	24 September 2010
Montane Peatlands and Swamps of the New England Tableland, NSW North Coast, Sydney Basin, South East Corner, South Eastern Highlands and Australian Alps bioregions	CEEC(ma)	17 December 2010
Porcupine Grass-Red Mallee-Gum Coolabah hummock grassland/low sparse woodland in the Broken Hill Complex Bioregion	CEEC	24 September 2010
Porcupine Grass-Red Mallee-Gum Subtropical Coastal Floodplain Forest of the NSW North Coast bioregion	EEC(ma)	17 December 2010

== 2004-2007 ==
The website covering these years lists final determinations for threatened species, populations and processes, but none for endangered ecological communities.

== 2000-2003 ==
Final determinations: ecological communities
Ecological community	FD/PD	Date gazetted
Byron Bay Dwarf Graminoid Clay Heath Community	EEC	February 11, 2000
Candelo Dry Grass Forest in the South East Corner Bioregion	EEC	November 17, 2000
Hygrocybeae Community of Lane Cove Bushland Park	EEC	March 03, 2000
Lagunaria Swamp Forest on Lord Howe Island	EEC	December 05, 2003
Mount Canobolas Xanthoparmelia Lichen Community	EEC	October 05, 2001
Sun Valley Cabbage Gum Forest in the Sydney Basin Bioregion	EEC	November 30, 2001

== 1996-1999 ==
Final determinations: ecological communities
Ecological community	FD/PD	Date gazetted
Ben Halls Gap National Park Sphagnum Moss Cool Temperate Rainforest Community	EEC	July 24, 1998
Castlereagh Swamp Woodland Community	EEC	December 24, 1999
Genowlan Point Allocasuarina nana heathland	EEC	December 18, 1998
Low Woodland with Heathland on indurated sand at Norah Head	EEC	July 24, 1998
Maroota Sands Swamp Forest	EEC	October 17, 1997
O'Hares Creek Shale Forest Community	EEC	December 18, 1998
Pittwater Spotted Gum Forest	EEC	December 18, 1998
Shale/sandstone Transition Forest	EEC	September 11, 1998
The shorebird community occurring on the relict tidal delta sands at Taren Point	EEC	September 29, 1998

== See also ==
- Threatened Species Conservation Act of 1995
- Cumberland Plain Woodland in the Sydney Basin Bioregion
