= Eupromerella fuscicollis =

Scientific classification
- Kingdom: Animalia
- Phylum: Arthropoda
- Class: Insecta
- Order: Coleoptera
- Suborder: Polyphaga
- Infraorder: Cucujiformia
- Family: Cerambycidae
- Genus: Eupromerella
- Species: E. fuscicollis

Binomial name
- Eupromerella fuscicollis (Bates, 1861)

Synonyms
- Acanthoderes fuscicollis Bates, 1861; Psapharochrus fuscicollis Bates, 1861

Species of beetle

Eupromerella fuscicollis is a species of beetle in the family Cerambycidae. It was described by Henry Walter Bates in 1861.
