= Eupromerella pseudopropinqua =

Scientific classification
- Kingdom: Animalia
- Phylum: Arthropoda
- Class: Insecta
- Order: Coleoptera
- Suborder: Polyphaga
- Infraorder: Cucujiformia
- Family: Cerambycidae
- Genus: Eupromerella
- Species: E. pseudopropinqua

Binomial name
- Eupromerella pseudopropinqua (Fuchs, 1959)

Synonyms
- Acanthoderes pseudopropinqua Fuchs, 1959; Psapharochrus pseudopropinquus (Fuchs, 1959)

Species of beetle

Eupromerella pseudopropinqua is a species of beetle in the family Cerambycidae. It was described by Ernst Fuchs in 1959.
