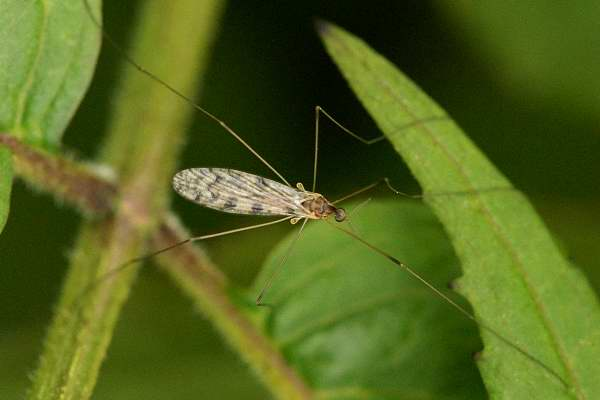
- Eloeophila maculata

Scientific classification
- Domain: Eukaryota
- Kingdom: Animalia
- Phylum: Arthropoda
- Class: Insecta
- Order: Diptera
- Family: Limoniidae
- Subfamily: Limnophilinae
- Genus: Eloeophila; Rondani, 1856

Type species
- Limnobia marmorata [= maculata (Meigen, 1804)] Meigen, 1818

Species
- See text

Synonyms
- Ephelia Schiner, 1863; Trichephelia Alexander, 1938; Elaeophila authors

= Eloeophila =

Genus of flies

Eloeophila is a genus of crane fly in the family Limoniidae.

== Species ==
- E. aldrichi (Alexander, 1927)
- E. aleator (Alexander, 1945)
- E. amamiana (Alexander, 1956)
- E. angolensis (Alexander, 1963)
- E. angustior (Alexander, 1919)
- E. apicata (Loew, 1871)
- E. apicisetula Kato, 2021
- E. apiculata (Alexander, 1919)
- E. aprilina (Osten Sacken, 1860)
- E. bicolorata (Alexander, 1958)
- E. bifida (Alexander, 1921)
- E. bipartita Stary, 2009
- E. canidorsalis Kato, 2021
- E. concreta (Edwards, 1933)
- E. czernyi (Strobl, 1909)
- E. delicola (Alexander, 1962)
- E. delmastroi Stary, 2009
- E. diacis (Alexander, 1972)
- E. dietziana (Alexander, 1925)
- E. dravidiana (Alexander, 1971)
- E. dubiosa (Alexander, 1917)
- E. dulitensis (Edwards, 1926)
- E. edentata (Alexander, 1919)
- E. enischnophallus Kato, 2021
- E. fascipennis (Brunetti, 1912)
- E. fumigata (Alexander, 1966)
- E. fuscoanalis (Alexander, 1971)
- E. granulata (Edwards, 1926)
- E. hadrophallus Kato, 2021
- E. igorota (Alexander, 1931)
- E. irene (Alexander, 1927)
- E. johnsoni (Alexander, 1914)
- E. kintaro (Alexander, 1957)
- E. laciniata (Edwards, 1928)
- E. latinigra (Alexander, 1941)
- E. lilliputina (Alexander, 1936)
- E. lucasi Stary, 2009
- E. maculata (Meigen, 1804)
- E. marmorataeformis (Riedel, 1914)
- E. marmorea (Alexander, 1934)
- E. maroccana Stary, 2009
- E. martinovskyi Stary, 2009
- E. miliaria (Egger, 1863)
- E. minor Stary, 2009
- E. modoc (Alexander, 1946)
- E. mundata (Loew, 1871)
- E. nupta (Alexander, 1947)
- E. ornata (Brunetti, 1912)
- E. oxyacantha (Alexander, 1971)
- E. paraprilina (Alexander, 1937)
- E. pectinistylus Stary, 2009
- E. perdilata (Alexander, 1966)
- E. persalsa (Alexander, 1940)
- E. pluriguttula (Alexander, 1966)
- E. prolongata (Alexander, 1956)
- E. punctulata Stary, 2009
- E. pusilla (Kuntze, 1920)
- E. sabrina (Alexander, 1929)
- E. serenensis (Alexander, 1940)
- E. serotinella (Alexander, 1926)
- E. serrulata (Alexander, 1932)
- E. seticellula (Alexander, 1938)
- E. shannoni (Alexander, 1921)
- E. similissima (Alexander, 1941)
- E. smithersi (Alexander, 1958)
- E. solstitialis (Alexander, 1926)
- E. sparsipunctum Stary, 2009
- E. subannulata (Alexander, 1946)
- E. subaprilina (Alexander, 1919)
- E. subdilata (Alexander, 1972)
- E. submarmorata (Verrall, 1887)
- E. suensoni (Alexander, 1926)
- E. superlineata (Doane, 1900)
- E. tergilobellus Kato, 2021
- E. tigricosta Stary, 2009
- E. trimaculata (Zetterstedt, 1838)
- E. urania (Speiser, 1923)
- E. ussuriana (Alexander, 1933)
- E. venaguttula (Alexander, 1934)
- E. vernata (Alexander, 1927)
- E. verralli (Bergroth, 1912)
- E. verrucosa Savchenko, 1976
- E. villiersi (Alexander, 1958)
- E. woodgatei (Alexander, 1946)
