= Eupromerella semigrisea =

Scientific classification
- Kingdom: Animalia
- Phylum: Arthropoda
- Clade: Pancrustacea
- Class: Insecta
- Order: Coleoptera
- Suborder: Polyphaga
- Infraorder: Cucujiformia
- Family: Cerambycidae
- Genus: Eupromerella
- Species: E. semigrisea

Binomial name
- Eupromerella semigrisea (Bates, 1861)

Species of beetle

Eupromerella semigrisea is a species of beetle in the family Cerambycidae. It was described by Bates in 1861. It is found in Brazil (Minas Gerais, Espírito Santo, Rio de Janeiro, São Paulo, Paraná, Santa Catarina) and Paraguay.
