= Eupromerella orbifera =

Scientific classification
- Kingdom: Animalia
- Phylum: Arthropoda
- Class: Insecta
- Order: Coleoptera
- Suborder: Polyphaga
- Infraorder: Cucujiformia
- Family: Cerambycidae
- Genus: Eupromerella
- Species: E. orbifera

Binomial name
- Eupromerella orbifera (Aurivillius, 1908)

Species of beetle

Eupromerella orbifera is a species of beetle in the family Cerambycidae. It was described by Per Olof Christopher Aurivillius in 1908.
