= Eupromerella leucogaea =

Scientific classification
- Kingdom: Animalia
- Phylum: Arthropoda
- Class: Insecta
- Order: Coleoptera
- Suborder: Polyphaga
- Infraorder: Cucujiformia
- Family: Cerambycidae
- Genus: Eupromerella
- Species: E. leucogaea

Binomial name
- Eupromerella leucogaea (Erichson, 1847)

Synonyms
- Acanthoderes leucogaeus Erichson, 1847; Acanthoderes virescens E. Fuchs, 1962

Species of beetle

Eupromerella leucogaea is a species of beetle in the family Cerambycidae. It was described by Wilhelm Ferdinand Erichson in 1847.
