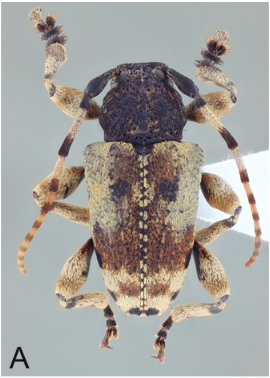

Scientific classification
- Kingdom: Animalia
- Phylum: Arthropoda
- Clade: Pancrustacea
- Class: Insecta
- Order: Coleoptera
- Suborder: Polyphaga
- Infraorder: Cucujiformia
- Family: Cerambycidae
- Genus: Eupromerella
- Species: E. nigroapicalis

Binomial name
- Eupromerella nigroapicalis (Aurivillius, 1916)

Synonyms
- Scleronotus nigroapicalis Aurivillius, 1916

= Eupromerella nigroapicalis =

Species of beetle

Eupromerella nigroapicalis is a species of beetle in the family Cerambycidae. It was described by Per Olof Christopher Aurivillius in 1916. It is found in Brazil (Bahia, Minas Gerais, Espirito Santo, Rio de Janeiro, São Paulo, Paraná, Santa Catarina).
