= Eupromerella propinqua =

Scientific classification
- Kingdom: Animalia
- Phylum: Arthropoda
- Clade: Pancrustacea
- Class: Insecta
- Order: Coleoptera
- Suborder: Polyphaga
- Infraorder: Cucujiformia
- Family: Cerambycidae
- Genus: Eupromerella
- Species: E. propinqua

Binomial name
- Eupromerella propinqua (Melzer, 1931)

Species of beetle

Eupromerella propinqua is a species of beetle in the family Cerambycidae. It was described by Melzer in 1931. It is found in Brazil (Bahia, Mato Grosso do Sul, Minas Gerais, Espírito Santo, Rio de Janeiro, São Paulo, Paraná, Santa Catarina), Bolivia (Santa Cruz), Paraguay and Argentina.
