= Eupromerella =

Scientific classification
- Kingdom: Animalia
- Phylum: Arthropoda
- Class: Insecta
- Order: Coleoptera
- Suborder: Polyphaga
- Infraorder: Cucujiformia
- Family: Cerambycidae
- Subfamily: Lamiinae
- Tribe: Acanthoderini
- Genus: Eupromerella; Fisher, 1938

Genus of beetles

Eupromerella is a genus of beetles in the family Cerambycidae, containing the following species:

- Eupromerella boliviana Santos-Silva, Botero & Wappes 2020
- Eupromerella clavator (Fabricius, 1801)
- Eupromerella fuscicollis (Bates, 1861)
- Eupromerella gallardi Tavakilian & Neouze 2013
- Eupromerella griseofasciata (Fuchs, 1959)
- Eupromerella inaequalis (Galileo & Martins, 2011)
- Eupromerella leucogaea (Erichson, 1847)
- Eupromerella maculata Martins, Galileo & de-Oliveira, 2009
- Eupromerella minima (Bates, 1861)
- Eupromerella nigroapicalis (Aurivillius, 1916)
- Eupromerella nigroocellata (Tippmann, 1960)
- Eupromerella orbifera (Aurivillius, 1908)
- Eupromerella picturata Martins, Galileo & de-Oliveira, 2009
- Eupromerella plaumanni (Fuchs, 1959)
- Eupromerella propinqua (Melzer, 1931)
- Eupromerella pseudopropinqua (Fuchs, 1959)
- Eupromerella quadrituberculata (Zajciw, 1964)
- Eupromerella semigrisea (Bates, 1861)
- Eupromerella travassosi (Melzer, 1935)
- Eupromerella versicolor (Melzer, 1935)
