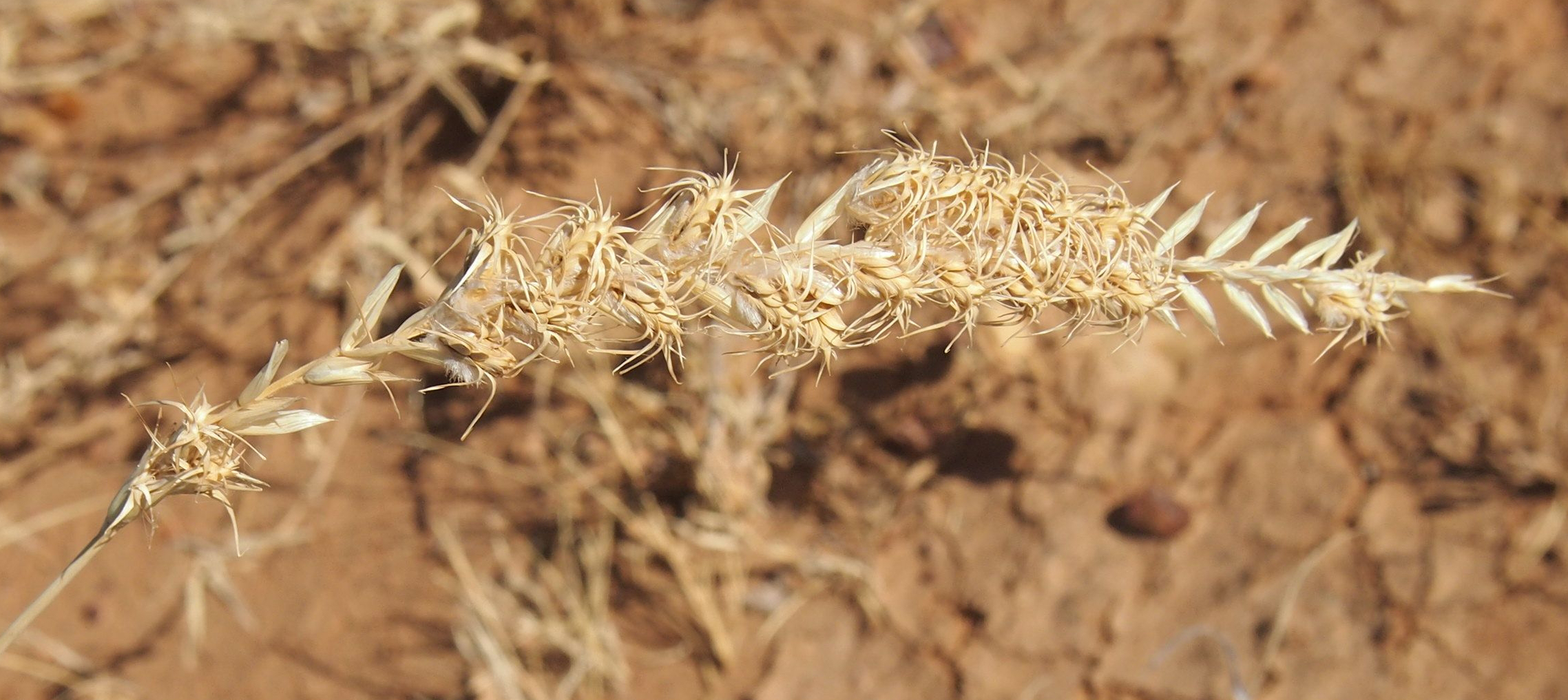

Scientific classification
- Kingdom: Plantae
- Clade: Tracheophytes
- Clade: Angiosperms
- Clade: Monocots
- Clade: Commelinids
- Order: Poales
- Family: Poaceae
- Subfamily: Chloridoideae
- Genus: Astrebla
- Species: A. squarrosa

Binomial name
- Astrebla squarrosa C.E.Hubb.

= Astrebla squarrosa =

Species of grass

Astrebla squarrosa, commonly known as bull Mitchell grass, is a long lived herb of the family Poaceae. It is often seen growing to 1.5 metres (5 ft) tall. Its common name is one bestowed in honour of Thomas Mitchell. The plant can be found on floodplains and heavy dark clay soils in arid to semi-arid Australia, being regarded as the most flood tolerant of the Astrebla grasses. Flowering occurs in response to rain. The coarse stems and difficult digestibility make it a less desirable Mitchell grass for livestock.
