= Eupromerella clavator =

Scientific classification
- Kingdom: Animalia
- Phylum: Arthropoda
- Class: Insecta
- Order: Coleoptera
- Suborder: Polyphaga
- Infraorder: Cucujiformia
- Family: Cerambycidae
- Genus: Eupromerella
- Species: E. clavator

Binomial name
- Eupromerella clavator (Fabricius, 1801)

Species of beetle

Eupromerella clavator is a species of beetle in the family Cerambycidae. It was described by Johan Christian Fabricius in 1801.
