= Eupromerella versicolor =

Scientific classification
- Kingdom: Animalia
- Phylum: Arthropoda
- Class: Insecta
- Order: Coleoptera
- Suborder: Polyphaga
- Infraorder: Cucujiformia
- Family: Cerambycidae
- Genus: Eupromerella
- Species: E. versicolor

Binomial name
- Eupromerella versicolor (Melzer, 1935)

Species of beetle

Eupromerella versicolor is a species of beetle in the family Cerambycidae. It was described by Melzer in 1935.
