= Eupromerella picturata =

Scientific classification
- Kingdom: Animalia
- Phylum: Arthropoda
- Class: Insecta
- Order: Coleoptera
- Suborder: Polyphaga
- Infraorder: Cucujiformia
- Family: Cerambycidae
- Genus: Eupromerella
- Species: E. picturata

Binomial name
- Eupromerella picturata Martins, Galileo & de-Oliveira, 2009

Species of beetle

Eupromerella picturata is a species of beetle in the family Cerambycidae. It was described by Martins, Galileo and de-Oliveira in 2009.
