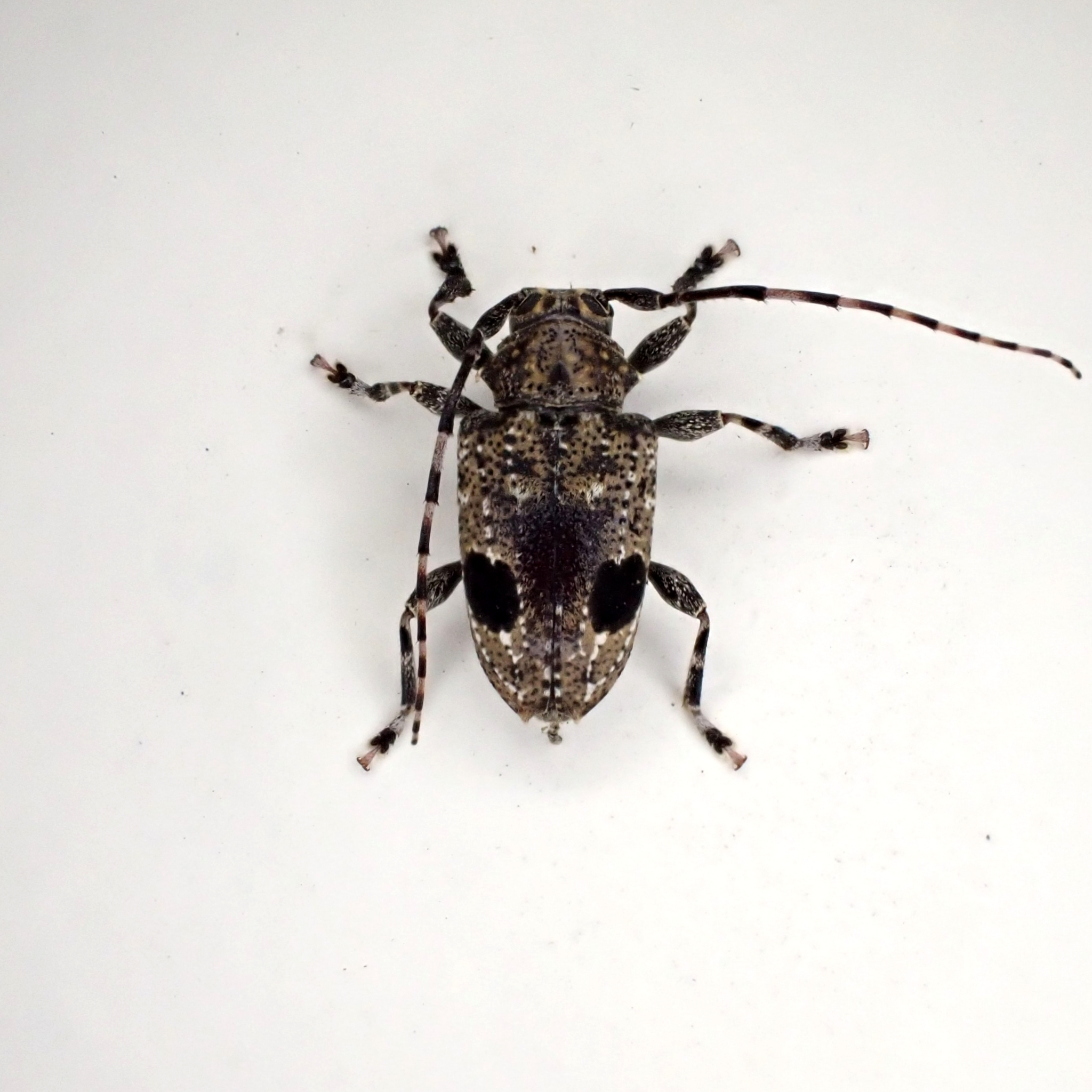

Scientific classification
- Kingdom: Animalia
- Phylum: Arthropoda
- Class: Insecta
- Order: Coleoptera
- Suborder: Polyphaga
- Infraorder: Cucujiformia
- Family: Cerambycidae
- Genus: Eupromerella
- Species: E. nigroocellata

Binomial name
- Eupromerella nigroocellata (Tippmann, 1960)

Synonyms
- Acanthoderes nigroocellata Tippmann, 1960; Psapharochrus nigroocellatus (Tippmann, 1960)

= Eupromerella nigroocellata =

Species of beetle

Eupromerella nigroocellata is a species of beetle in the family Cerambycidae. It was described by Tippmann in 1960.
