= Eupromerella quadrituberculata =

Scientific classification
- Kingdom: Animalia
- Phylum: Arthropoda
- Class: Insecta
- Order: Coleoptera
- Suborder: Polyphaga
- Infraorder: Cucujiformia
- Family: Cerambycidae
- Genus: Eupromerella
- Species: E. quadrituberculata

Binomial name
- Eupromerella quadrituberculata (Zajciw, 1964)

Synonyms
- Acanthoderes quadrituberculata Zajciw, 1964; Psapharochrus quadrituberculatus (Zajciw, 1964)

Species of beetle

Eupromerella quadrituberculata is a species of beetle in the family Cerambycidae. It was described by Zajciw in 1964.
