= Eupromerella plaumanni =

Scientific classification
- Kingdom: Animalia
- Phylum: Arthropoda
- Class: Insecta
- Order: Coleoptera
- Suborder: Polyphaga
- Infraorder: Cucujiformia
- Family: Cerambycidae
- Genus: Eupromerella
- Species: E. plaumanni

Binomial name
- Eupromerella plaumanni (Fuchs, 1959)

Synonyms
- Acanthoderes Plaumanni Fuchs, 1959; Psapharochrus plaumanni (Fuchs, 1959)

Species of beetle

Eupromerella plaumanni is a species of beetle in the family Cerambycidae. It was described by Ernst Fuchs in 1959.
