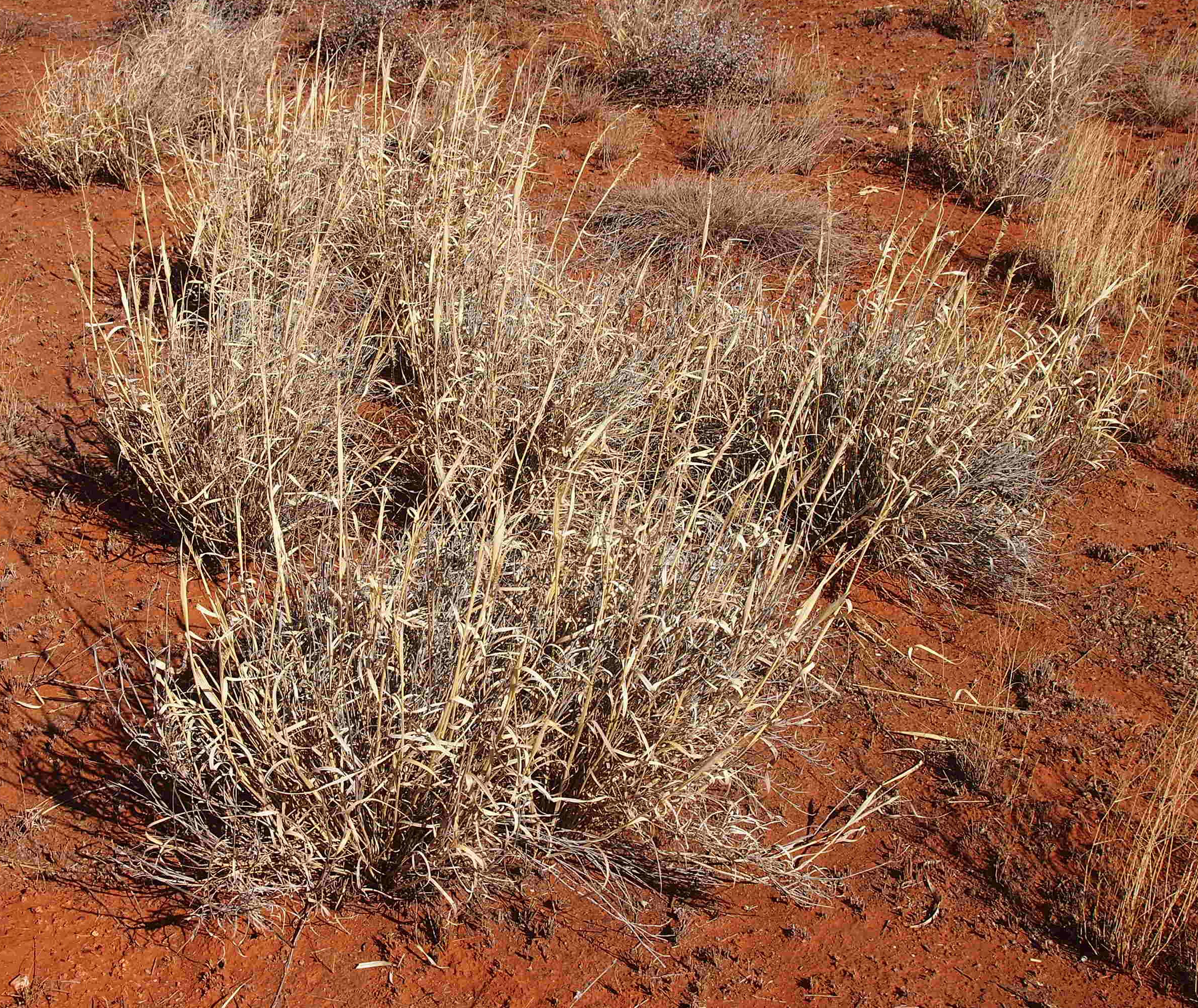
- Astrebla pectinata

Scientific classification
- Kingdom: Plantae
- Clade: Tracheophytes
- Clade: Angiosperms
- Clade: Monocots
- Clade: Commelinids
- Order: Poales
- Family: Poaceae
- Subfamily: Chloridoideae
- Tribe: Cynodonteae
- Subtribe: Eleusininae
- Genus: Astrebla; F.Muell.

Type species
- Astrebla pectinata (Lindl.) F.Muell. ex Benth.

= Astrebla =

Mitchell grass

Genus of grasses

Astrebla is a small genus of xerophytic (adapted to survive in an environment with little liquid water) grasses found only in Australia. They are the dominant grass across much of the continent. They are commonly known as Mitchell grass after Scottish explorer Thomas Mitchell (1792-1855), who first collected a specimen near Bourke in New South Wales.

Mitchell grasses grow on clay soils, mainly between an upper limit of 600 millimetres or 24 inches and a lower limit of 200 millimetres or 8 inches average annual rainfall, and at even lower rainfall in depressions where the water concentrates following rains, for example in Sturt's Stony Desert. Mitchell grasses are deep-rooted and become dormant during drought, allowing them to survive extended periods without rainfall.

They are commonly found clumped together and reaching one metre high, providing habitat for organisms such as mammals.

Species

Scientific name	Common name	Characteristics
Astrebla elymoides	hoop Mitchell grass	the second most common species
Astrebla lappacea	curly Mitchell grass	the most common species
Astrebla pectinata	barley Mitchell grass	the most drought-tolerant species
Astrebla squarrosa	bull Mitchell grass	the most flood-tolerant species

== See also ==
- List of Poaceae genera
