= Eupromerella griseofasciata =

Scientific classification
- Kingdom: Animalia
- Phylum: Arthropoda
- Clade: Pancrustacea
- Class: Insecta
- Order: Coleoptera
- Suborder: Polyphaga
- Infraorder: Cucujiformia
- Family: Cerambycidae
- Genus: Eupromerella
- Species: E. griseofasciata

Binomial name
- Eupromerella griseofasciata (E. Fuchs, 1959)

Species of beetle

Eupromerella griseofasciata is a species of beetle in the family Cerambycidae. It was described by Ernst Fuchs in 1959. It is found in Brazil (Minas Gerais, São Paulo, Paraná, Santa Catarina, Rio Grande do Sul), Paraguay and Argentina (Misiones).
