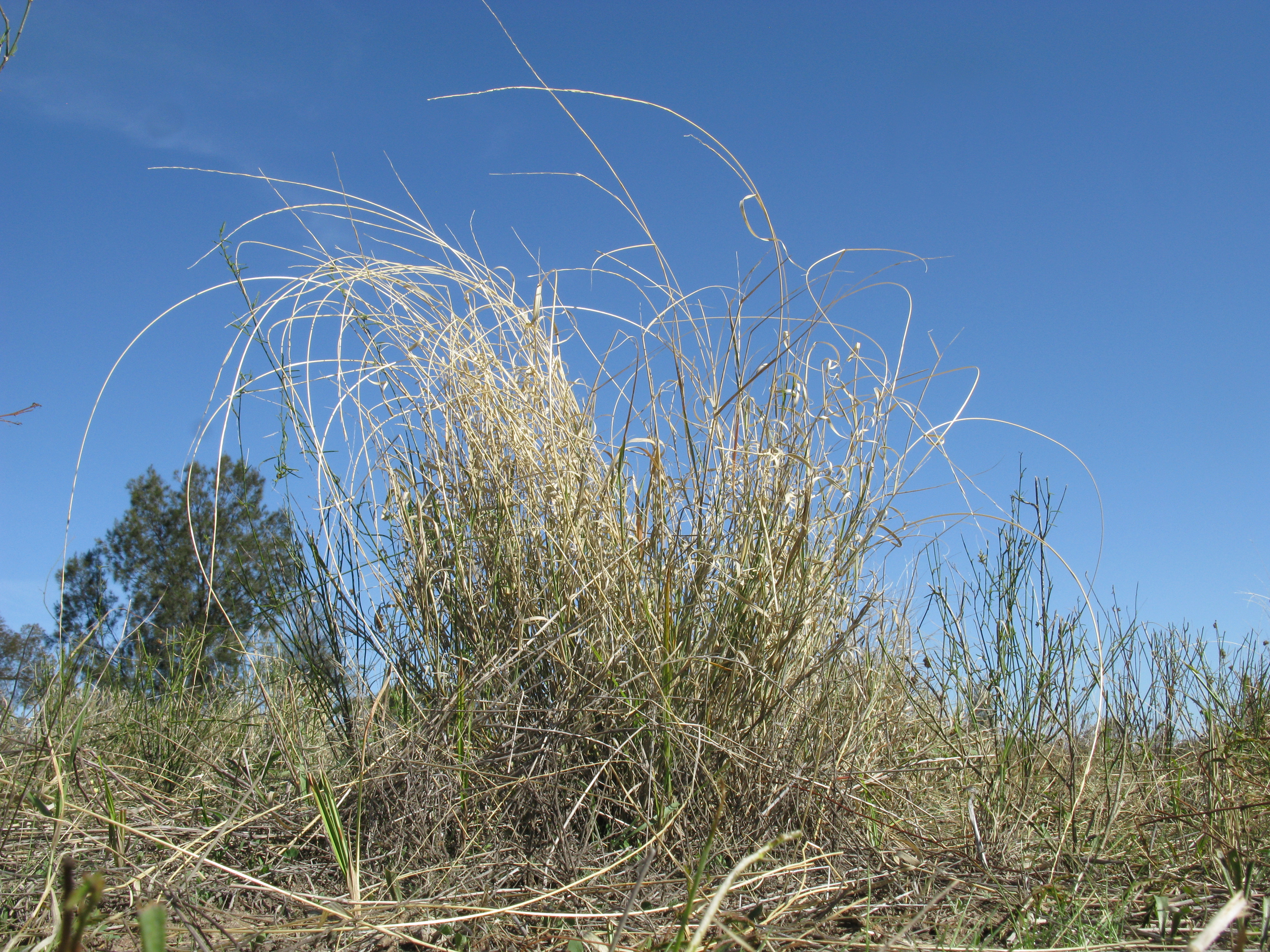
- Near Baradine, Australia

Scientific classification
- Kingdom: Plantae
- Clade: Tracheophytes
- Clade: Angiosperms
- Clade: Monocots
- Clade: Commelinids
- Order: Poales
- Family: Poaceae
- Subfamily: Chloridoideae
- Genus: Astrebla
- Species: A. elymoides

Binomial name
- Astrebla elymoides F.Muell. ex F.M.Bailey

= Astrebla elymoides =

Species of grass

Astrebla elymoides, commonly known as hoop Mitchell grass, is a herb of the family Poaceae that grows to 1 metre (3 1/2 ft) tall. It was named in honour of Thomas Mitchell. It is found on floodplains and heavy self-mulching clay soils in arid to semi-arid Australia, and flowers in response to rain or flooding. It is regarded as the best of the Astrebla grasses for grazing, particularly for cattle.
