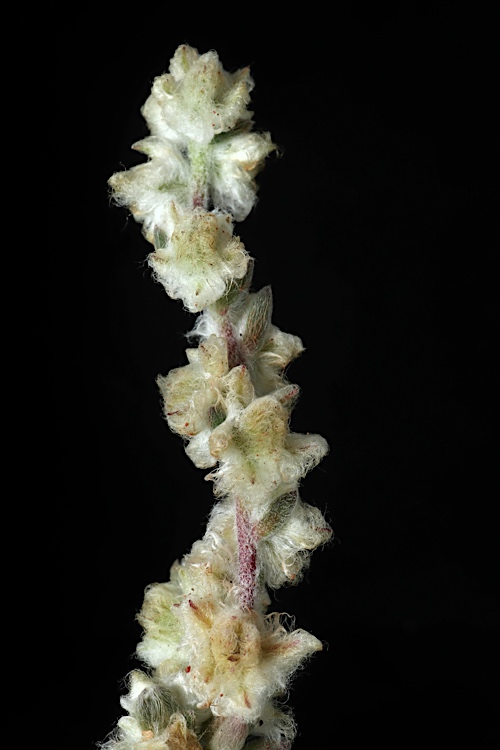

Scientific classification
- Kingdom: Plantae
- Clade: Tracheophytes
- Clade: Angiosperms
- Clade: Eudicots
- Order: Caryophyllales
- Family: Amaranthaceae
- Genus: Maireana
- Species: M. pentagona

Binomial name
- Maireana pentagona (R.H.Anderson) Paul G.Wilson

Synonyms
- Kochia pentagona R.H.Anderson; Chenolea pentagona (R.H.Anderson) Ewart

= Maireana pentagona =

Species of plant in the amaranth family

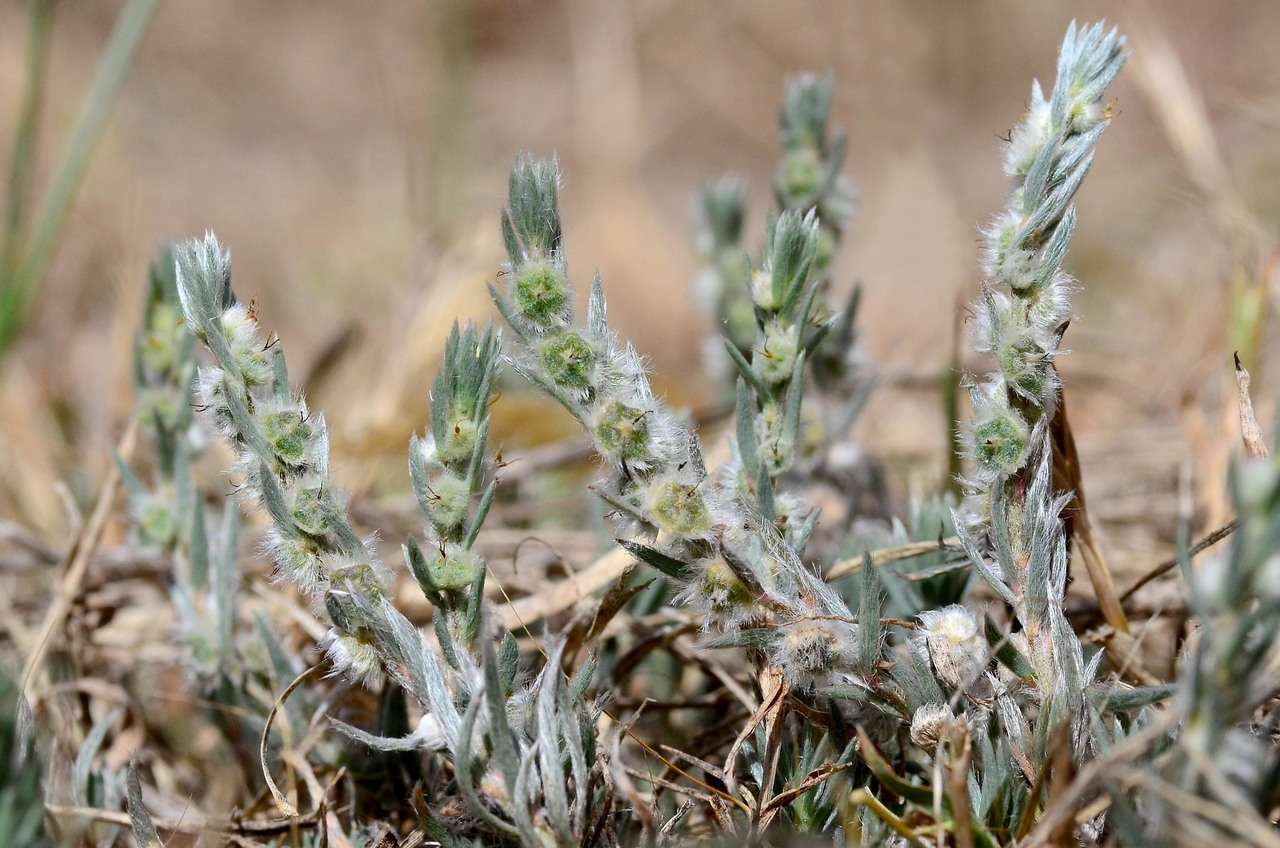
Habit near Dimboola

Maireana pentagona, commonly known as hairy bluebush or slender fissure-weed, is a species of flowering plant in the family Amaranthaceae, and is endemic to Australia. It is a prostrate to low-lying perennial with woolly branches, densely hairy linear leaves, flowers arranged singly and a woolly fruiting perianth, the upper surface with a thick, hard ridge.

== Description ==
Maireana pentagona is prostrate to low-lying or ascending perennial shrub that typically grows to a height of about 10 cm (3.9 in), its branches covered with woolly hairs. Its leaves are linear, mostly 7–12 mm (0.28–0.47 in) long and densely covered with shaggy hairs but often becoming glabrous with age. The flowers are densely hairy and arranged singly, sometimes in leafy spikes or scattered along branches. The fruiting perianth is covered with shaggy hairs, pentagonal in outline, 2.5–4 mm (0.098–0.157 in) in diameter, the lower surface convex with a narrow wing, and the upper surface with a thick, hard ridge.

== Taxonomy ==
This species was first formally described in 1926 by Robert Henry Anderson, who gave it the name Kochia pentagona in Proceedings of the Linnean Society of New South Wales from specimens collected by Albert Morris near Trangie in 1924. In 1975, Paul G. Wilson transferred the species to Maireana as M. pentagona in the journal Nuytsia. The specific epithet (pentagona) means 'five-angled', referring to the fruiting perianth.

== Distribution and habitat ==
Maireana pentagona usually grows in heavy soil and is found on the western slopes and plains of New South Wales, north-western Victoria, south-eastern South Australia, often in large numbers on the Murray River floodplain, and less commonly in Queensland and north of Carnarvon in Western Australia.
