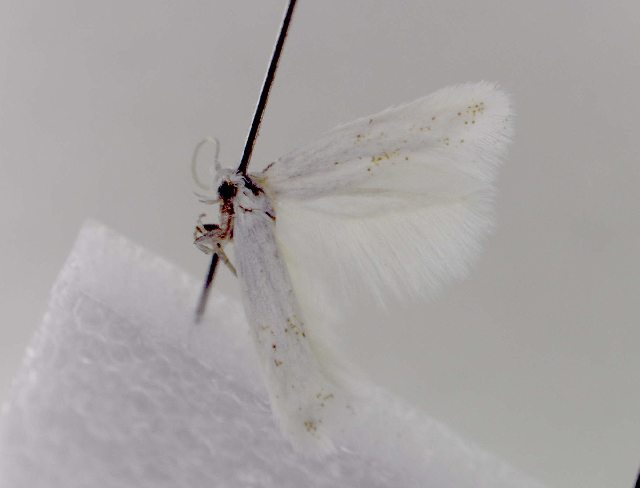

Scientific classification
- Domain: Eukaryota
- Kingdom: Animalia
- Phylum: Arthropoda
- Class: Insecta
- Order: Lepidoptera
- Family: Elachistidae
- Genus: Elachista
- Species: E. maculata

Binomial name
- Elachista maculata Parenti, 1978

= Elachista maculata =

Species of moth

Elachista maculata is a moth of the family Elachistidae that is found in North Macedonia, Bulgaria and Turkey.
