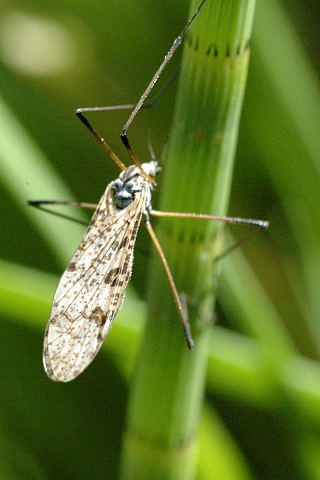

Scientific classification
- Domain: Eukaryota
- Kingdom: Animalia
- Phylum: Arthropoda
- Class: Insecta
- Order: Diptera
- Family: Limoniidae
- Genus: Eloeophila
- Species: E. maculata

Binomial name
- Eloeophila maculata (Meigen, 1804)

Synonyms
- Limonia maculata Meigen, 1804

= Eloeophila maculata =

Species of fly

Eloeophila maculata is a species of fly in the family Limoniidae. It is a Palearctic species with a limited distribution in Europe. It is found in a wide range of habitats and micro habitats: in earth rich in humus, in swamps and marshes, in leaf litter and in wet spots in woods.
