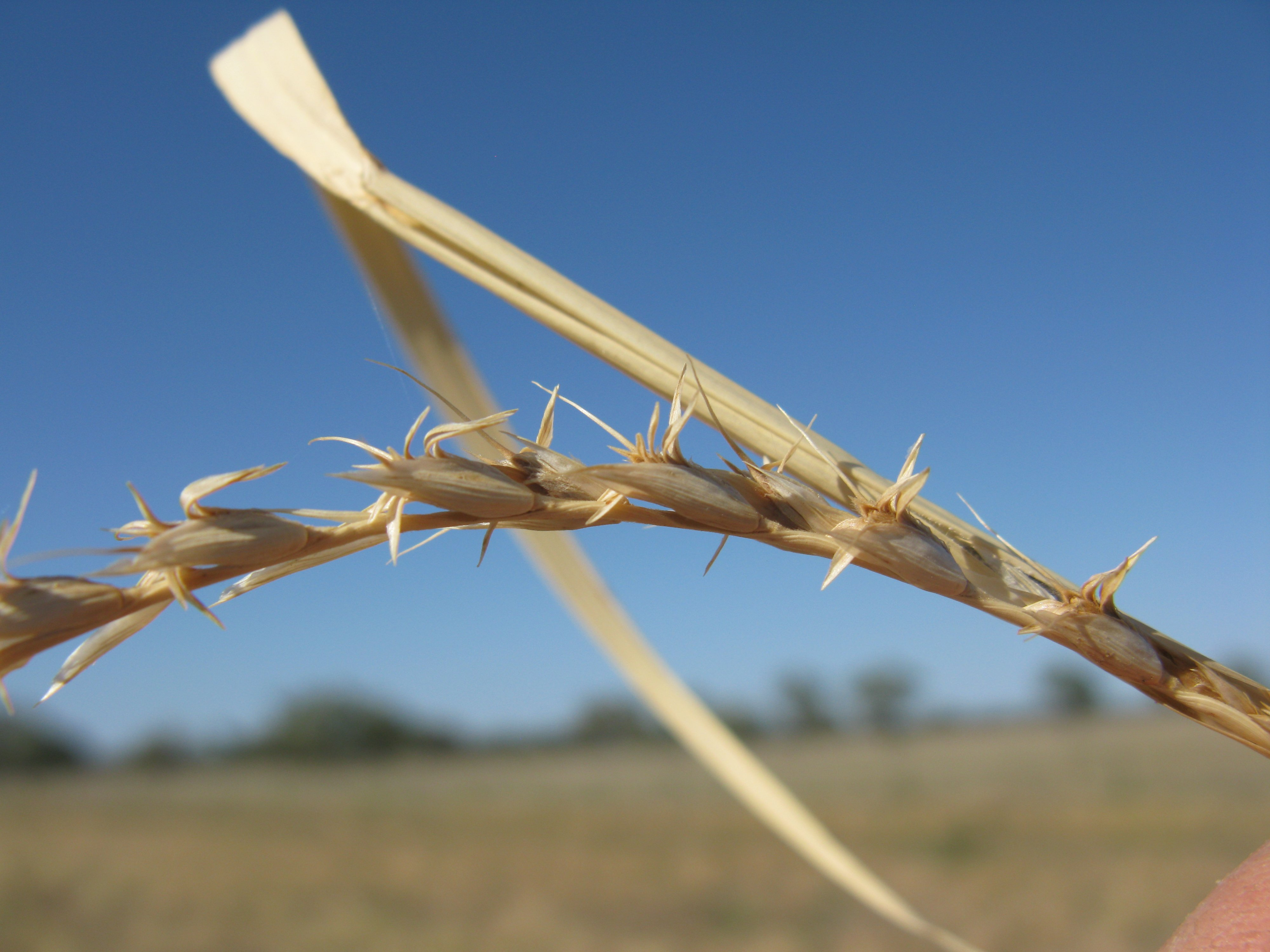
- near Moree, Australia

Scientific classification
- Kingdom: Plantae
- Clade: Embryophytes
- Clade: Tracheophytes
- Clade: Spermatophytes
- Clade: Angiosperms
- Clade: Monocots
- Clade: Commelinids
- Order: Poales
- Family: Poaceae
- Subfamily: Chloridoideae
- Genus: Astrebla
- Species: A. lappacea

Binomial name
- Astrebla lappacea (Lindl.) Domin
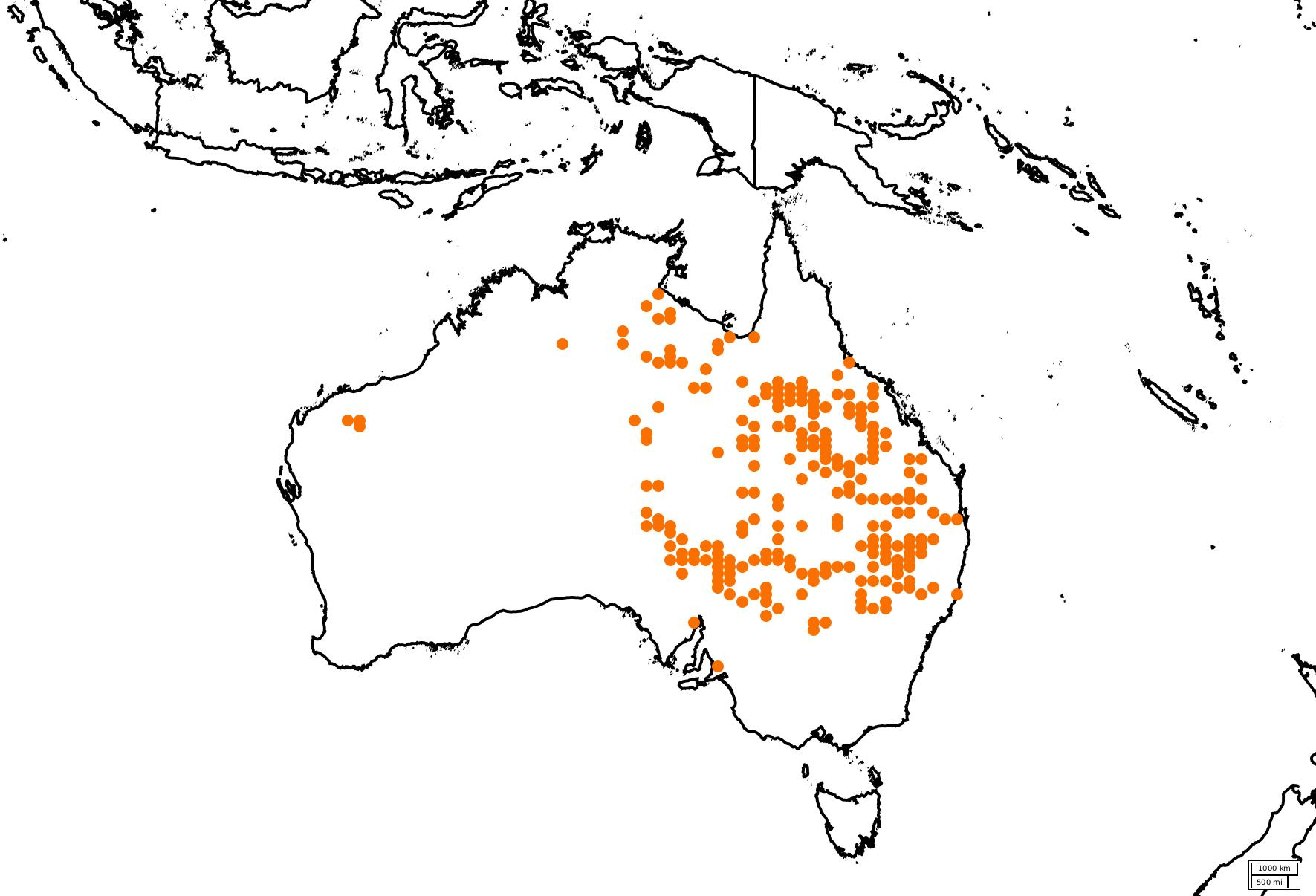
- Occurrence data from AVH

= Astrebla lappacea =

Species of grass

Astrebla lappacea, commonly known as curly Mitchell grass, is a herb of the family Poaceae from the order Poales. It grows to 0.9 metres (3 ft) tall. Named in honour of Thomas Mitchell, the Latin specific epithet of lappacea is derived from lappa meaning with burrs. The most common of the Astrebla species, it is a widespread Australian inland plant. It is often seen on floodplains and heavy self-mulching clay soils, and flowers in response to rain or flooding. This grass is palatable to livestock, even when dry.

== Description ==
Astrebla lappacea is a densely tufted tussock grass, growing up to 0.9 metres tall (3 ft) and with a base approximately 60 cm in diameter when fully grown. As a perennial grass, it can live up to 30 years. A. lappacea is classified as a hermaphrodite, containing both male and female reproductive organs. The root system of Astrebla lappacea is adapted to a hot dry climate, with shallow widespread roots which make the most of light rainfall, and deep tap roots which draw moisture from the subsoil.

The culm (grass stem) has a variety of lengths (ranging up to over a metre). This is a thin, hairless, and smooth stem. Often the culm is branched at the nodes.

The leaf blades range from 8-30 centimetres long and 3-7 millimetres wide, are glabrous or tuberculate-scabrous, and curl when hayed. The size of the seedhead depends on growing conditions, but it bears an open spike, and the inflorescence (approximately 5–30 cm long) contains 2 rows of regularly occurring spikelets (7-13mm long) of which there are typically 2-6 fertile florets. Glumes protect the spikelets by covering them.

== Taxonomy ==
A. lappacea belongs to the genus Astrebla. This is a small genus of xerophytic grasses, commonly known as Mitchell grass, and contains 4 grass species endemic to Australia. Common traits include resistance to drought, including deep roots and an ability to become dormant during drought.

The taxonomical synonym for A. lappacea is Astrebla triticoides.

== Distribution and habitat ==
The most widespread of the Astrebla genus, A. lappacea is found predominantly in northwestern NSW and central west QLD. Typically, these grasses occur in floodplains and areas of self-mulching clay.

Mitchell grasses are often the most common species within these grasslands due to their longevity (30 years). They are however usually restricted to alkaline, clay soils.

== Ecology ==
A. lappacea is the most commonly occurring species within the Astrebla genus, however it has a Conservation status of Priority 3: Poorly known species. It provides important grassland pastures in semi-arid and arid areas of Australia. Mitchell grasslands provide an ideal environment for ephemeral plants to grow when conditions are favourable.

A. lappacea provides an important component of grazing animals diet, specifically cattle and sheep. This is in addition to other Australian native wildlife which rely on it for grazing and shelter.

This grass can thrive in cracking clay soils (a result of irregular rainfall and drought conditions), and dry areas consisting of rainfall <500 mm annually. This is due to the specialised root system which allows for survival in drought conditions. A. lappacea is also very adept at recovering after heavy grazing, making it ideal pasture.

However, A. lappacea has limited tolerance for flooding (1-month maximum inundation) and frost.

== Reproduction and dispersal ==
A. lappacea flowers from September through till May, however this is often dependent on weather conditions of the region. Typically, flowering occurs as a result of rainfall and flooding.

Diaspore dispersal methods vary, however the most common is through wind (anemochory) and animal dispersion (epizoochory). This is suggested through the Latin name lappacea meaning ‘with burrs’, as these burrs stick to livestock walking through the grasslands and thus the seeds are carried across large distances.

== Uses ==
The main use of A. lappacea is for grazing. While it supports growth of ephemeral grasses which are preferred by livestock, Curly Mitchell grass provides sufficient fodder to bulk out the rest of livestock’s diet.

== Gallery ==
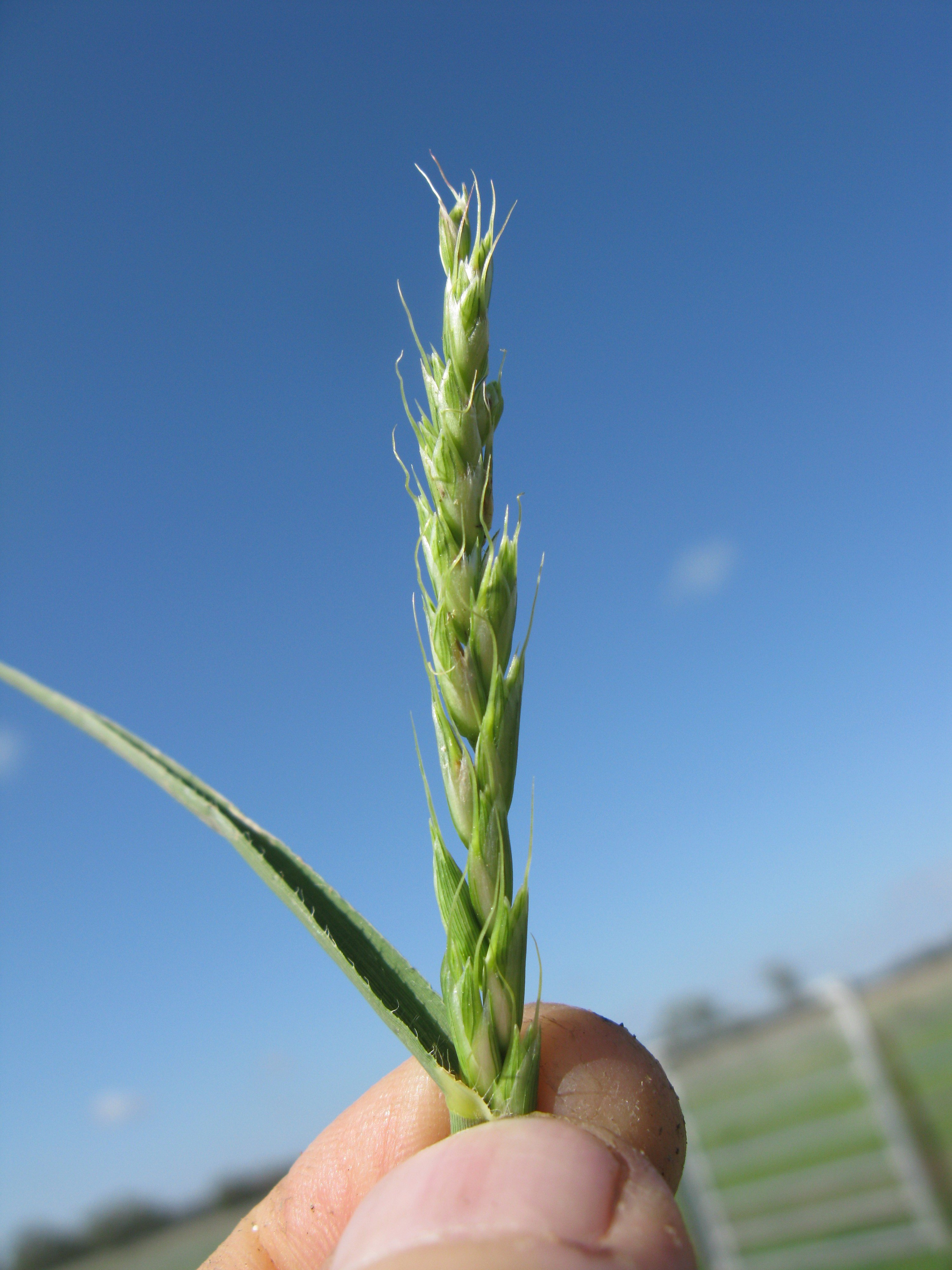
A. lappacea seedhead.

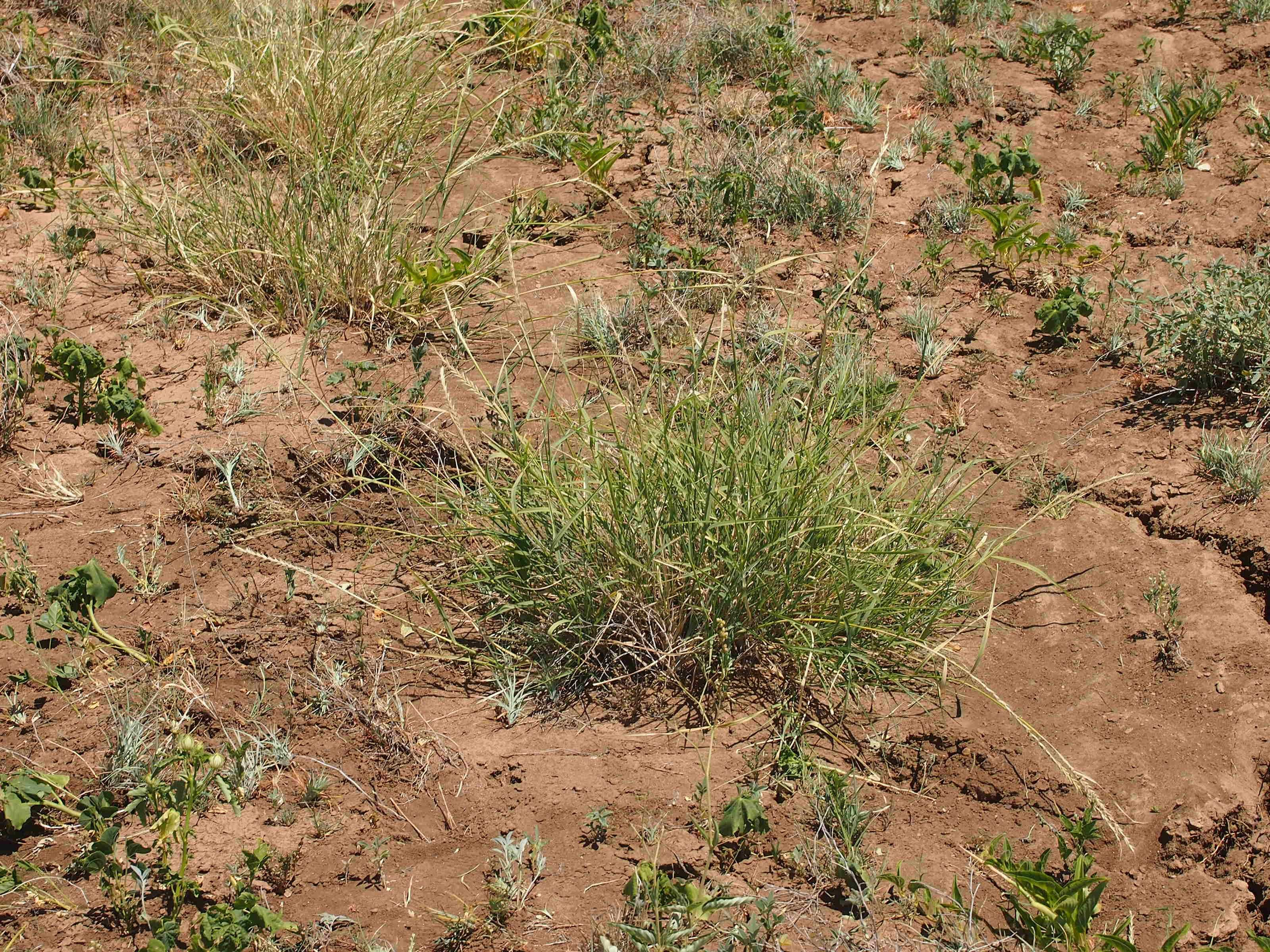
A. lappacea habitat
