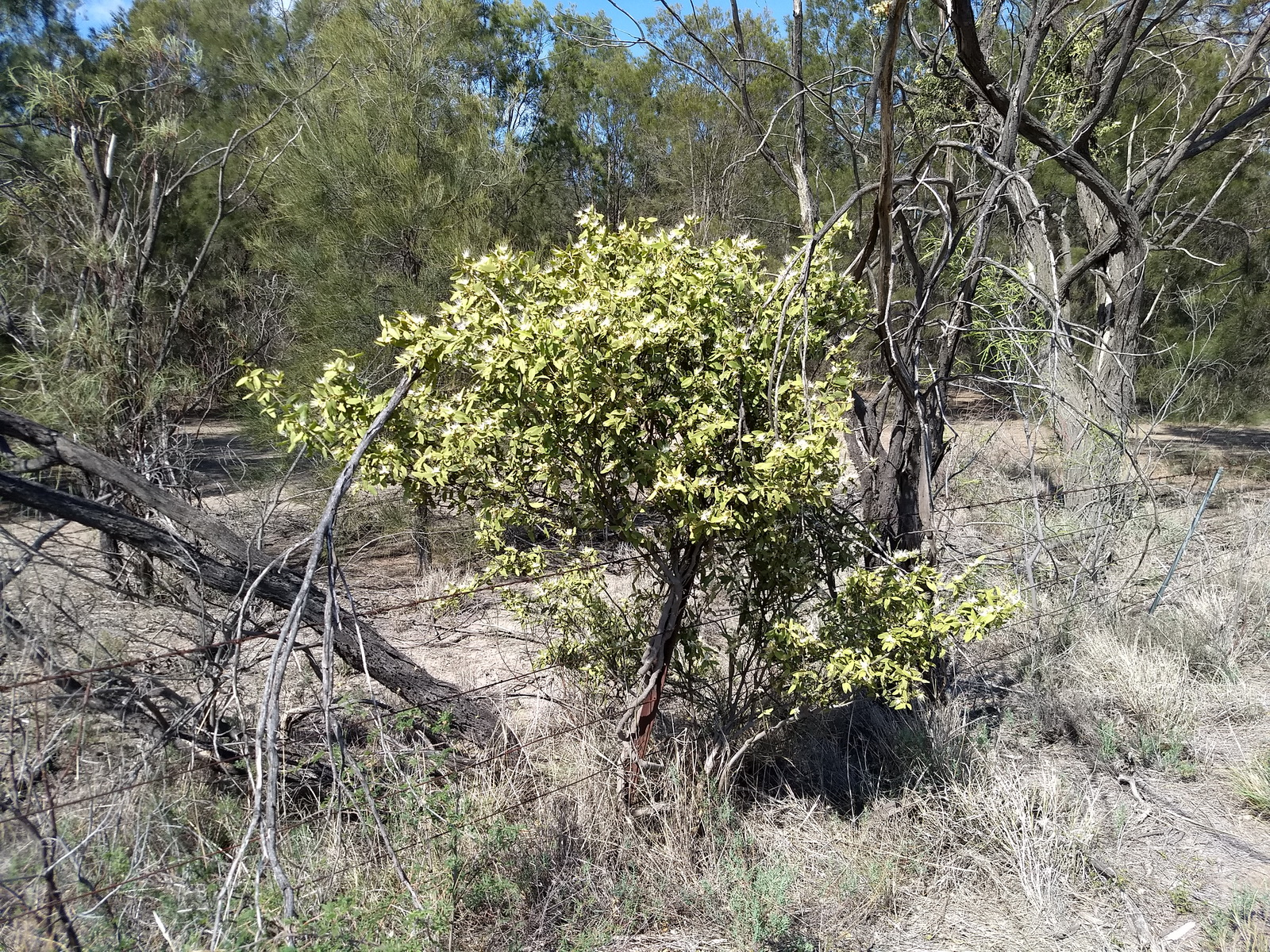

Scientific classification
- Kingdom: Plantae
- Clade: Tracheophytes
- Clade: Angiosperms
- Clade: Eudicots
- Clade: Rosids
- Order: Brassicales
- Family: Capparaceae
- Genus: Capparis
- Species: C. lasiantha

Binomial name
- Capparis lasiantha R.Br. ex DC.
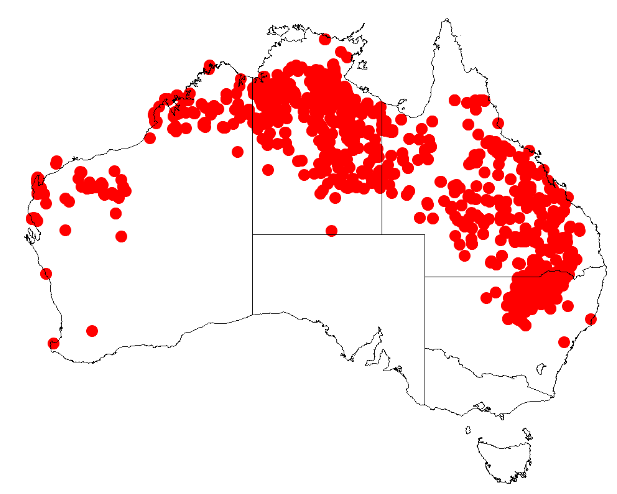
- Occurrence data from GBIF

= Capparis lasiantha =

Species of plant endemic to Australia

Capparis lasiantha is an endemic Australian plant with a range that extends from the Kimberley region through the Northern Territory and Queensland to northern New South Wales, primarily in drier inland areas although the species extends to the coast in Central Queensland. Common names are numerous and include wyjeelah, nepine, split jack, nipang creeper, nipan, native orange and bush caper.

== Description ==
The seedlings and young plants begin life as climbing vines that cling to the host plants by means sharp spines on the stems. Some plants may retain this climbing form into maturity, while others go on to develop into a scrambling shrub up to 3 m (10 ft) in height.

Mature plants produce large, white perfumed flowers which are followed by hard, ellipsoidal fruit up to 4 cm (1.6 in) long. Upon ripening the fruit becomes soft and fragrant, eventually splitting to reveal a sweet, edible pulp surrounding the seed.

== Taxonomy ==
Swiss botanist Augustin Pyramus de Candolle described Capparis lasiantha in his 1824 work Prodromus Systematis Naturalis Regni Vegetabilis, and it still bears its original name. It was originally published by Robert Brown who did not give enough detail in his description to distinguish it from other species. This was later done by de Candolle, and hence the correct name is Capparis lasiantha R.Br. ex DC. with both botanists treated as authors.

== Ecology and uses ==
Caterpillars of the caper white (Belenois java) feed on its leaves. Capparis lasiantha has been recorded as a host for the mistletoe species Lysiana subfalcata.

The fruit was used as food by Aboriginal people throughout its range. A concoction from the bark was used as a treatment for animal bites and stings in the Broome region. Farmers could use the leaves as fodder for livestock in periods of drought.

== Cultivation ==
A drought tolerant plant, Capparis lasiantha can be grown in arid or subtropical gardens, its heavy flowering and edible fruit give it horticultural potential. It can be propagated by seed.

== Gallery ==
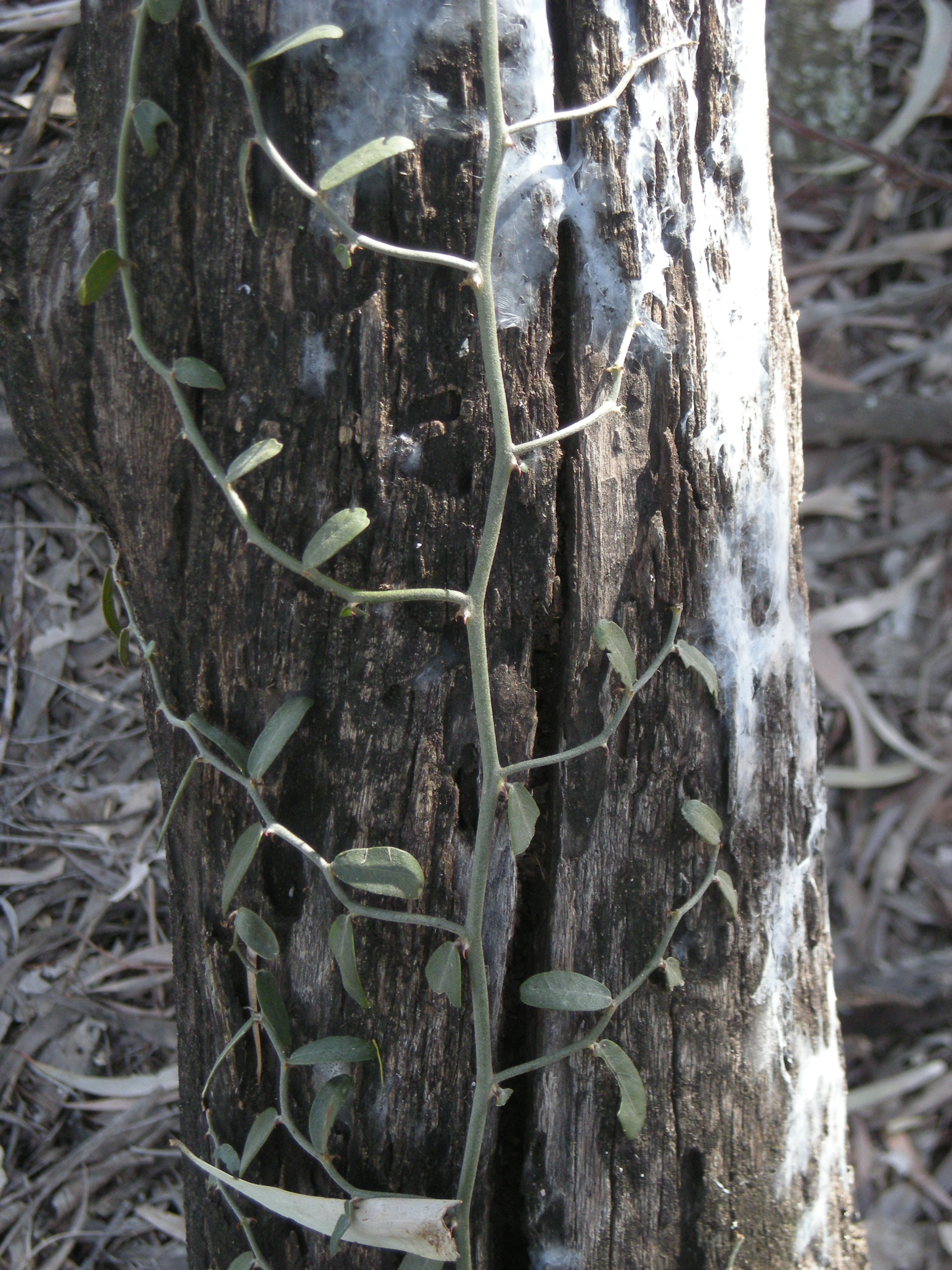
Juvenile vine form attached to host with hooks

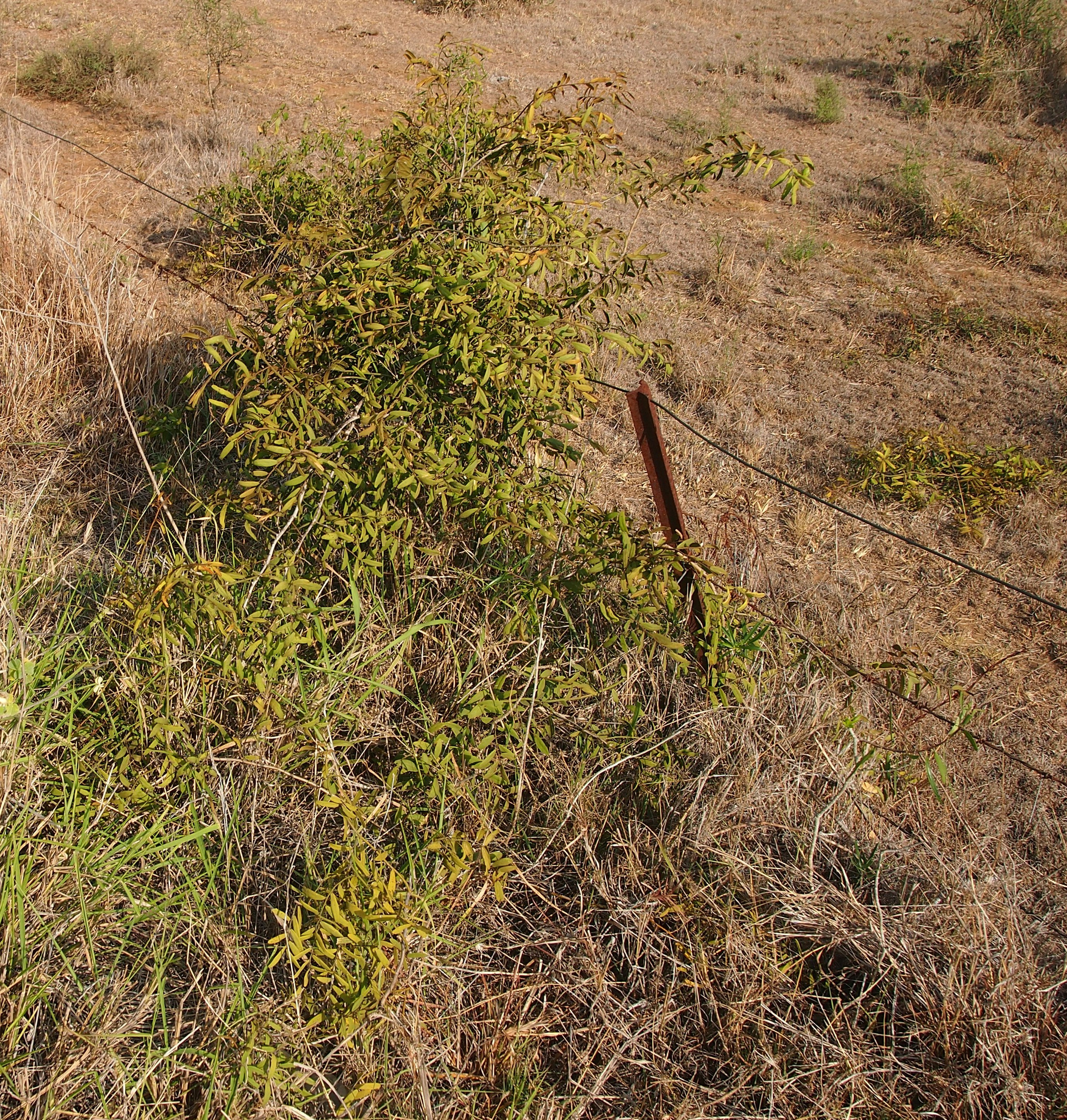
Intermediate form scrambling over fence

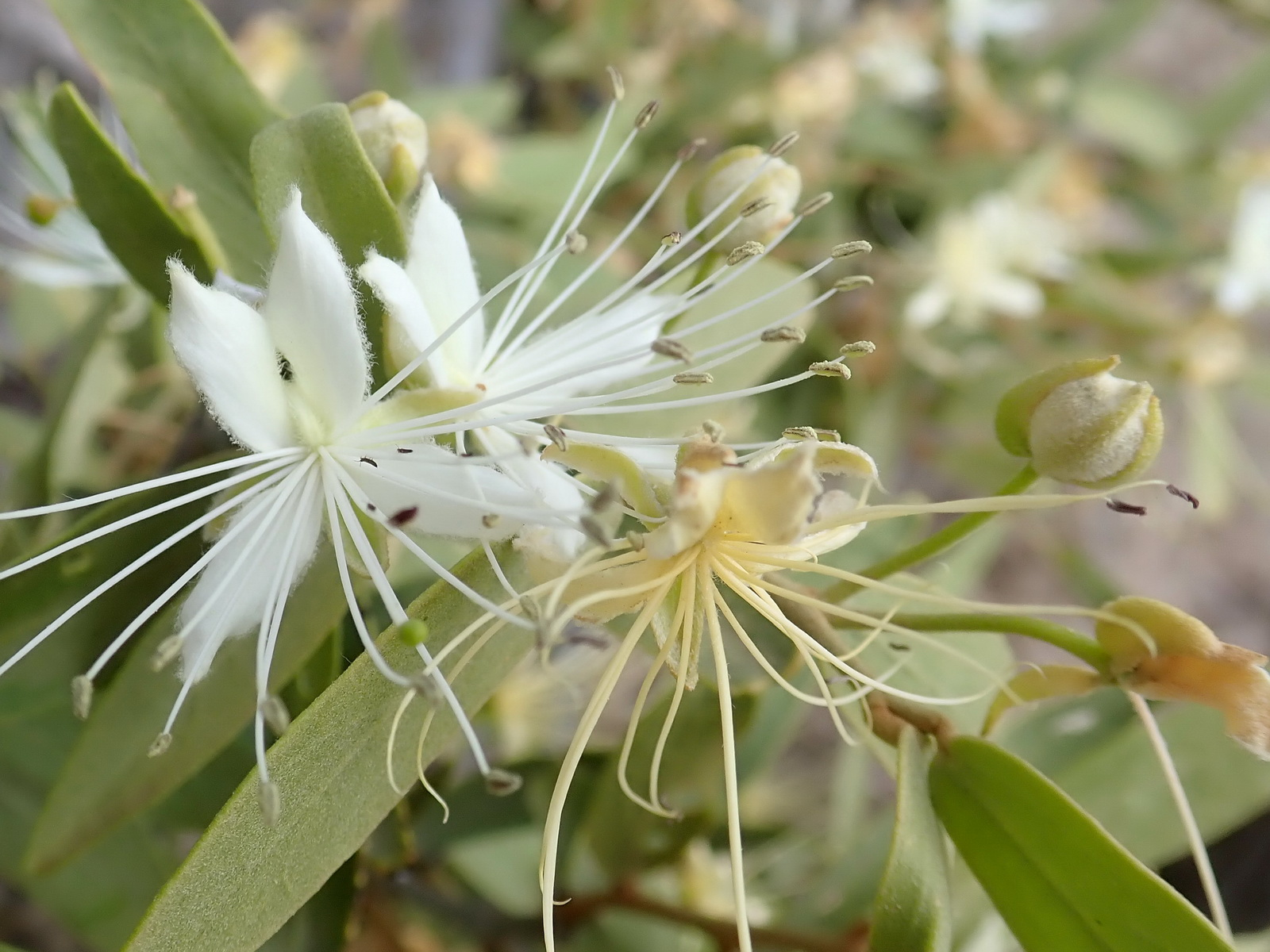
Flower

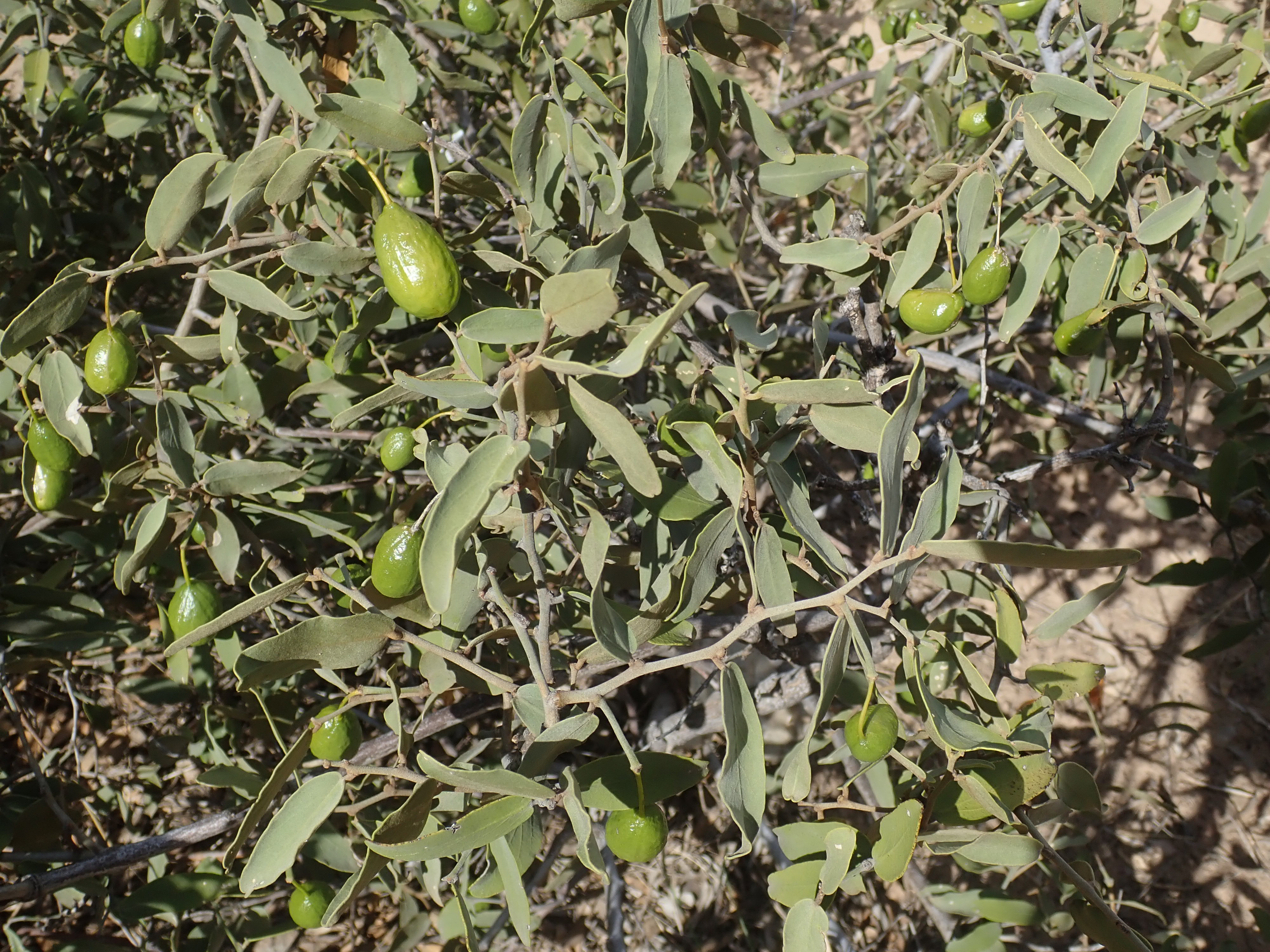
Fruit - typical elongated ovoid

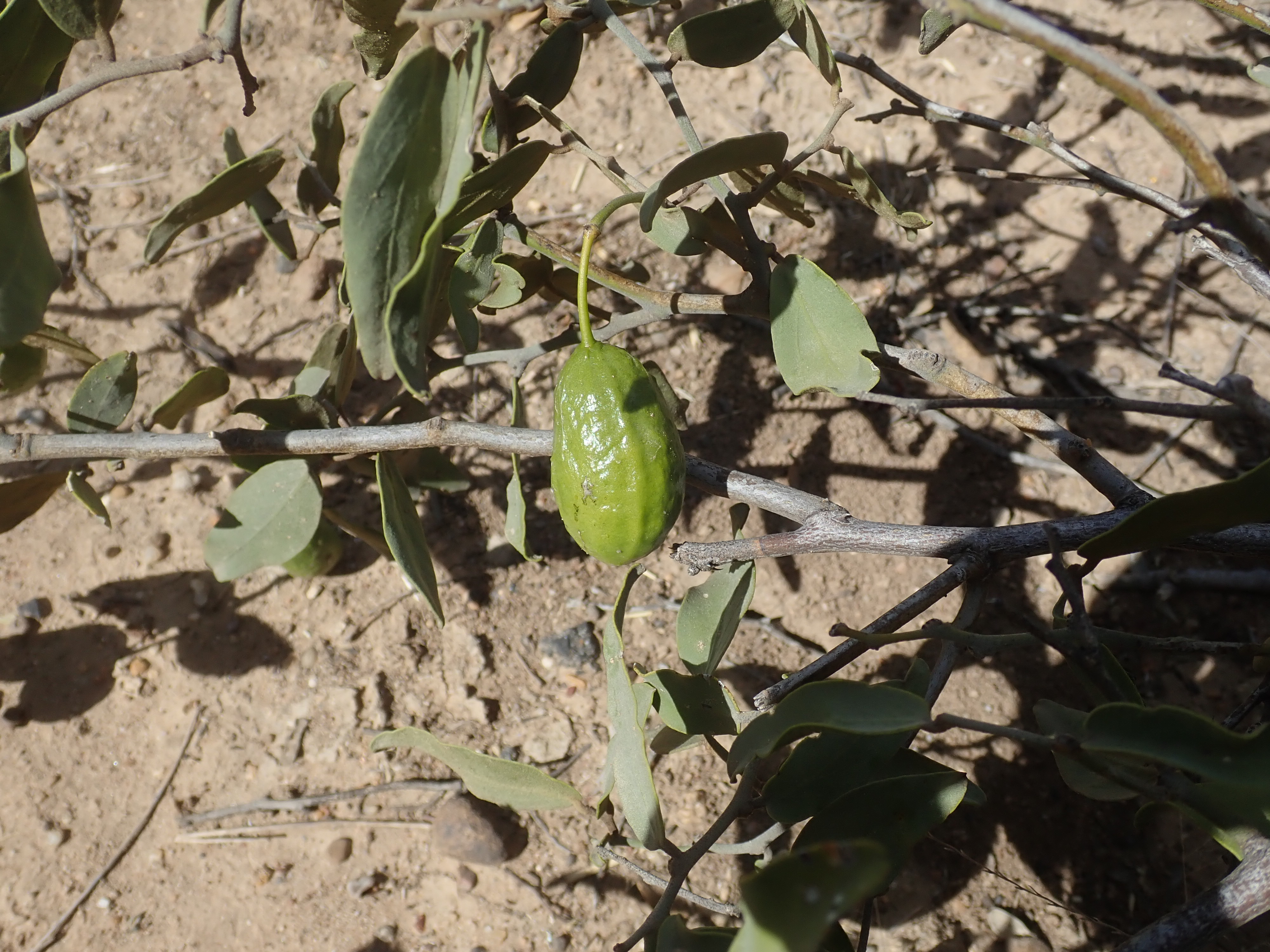
Fruit - typical elongated ovoid

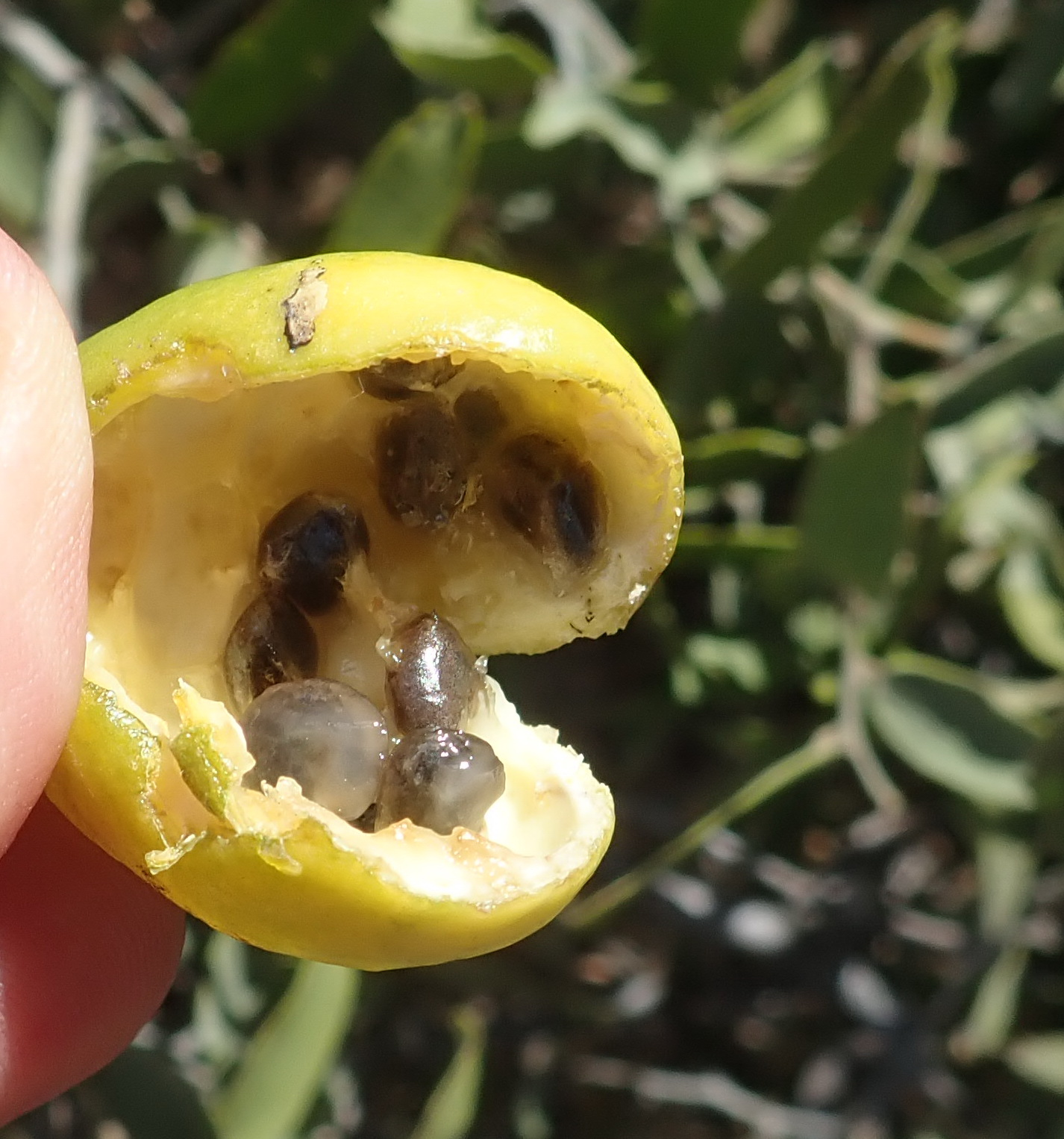
Fruit that has split open
