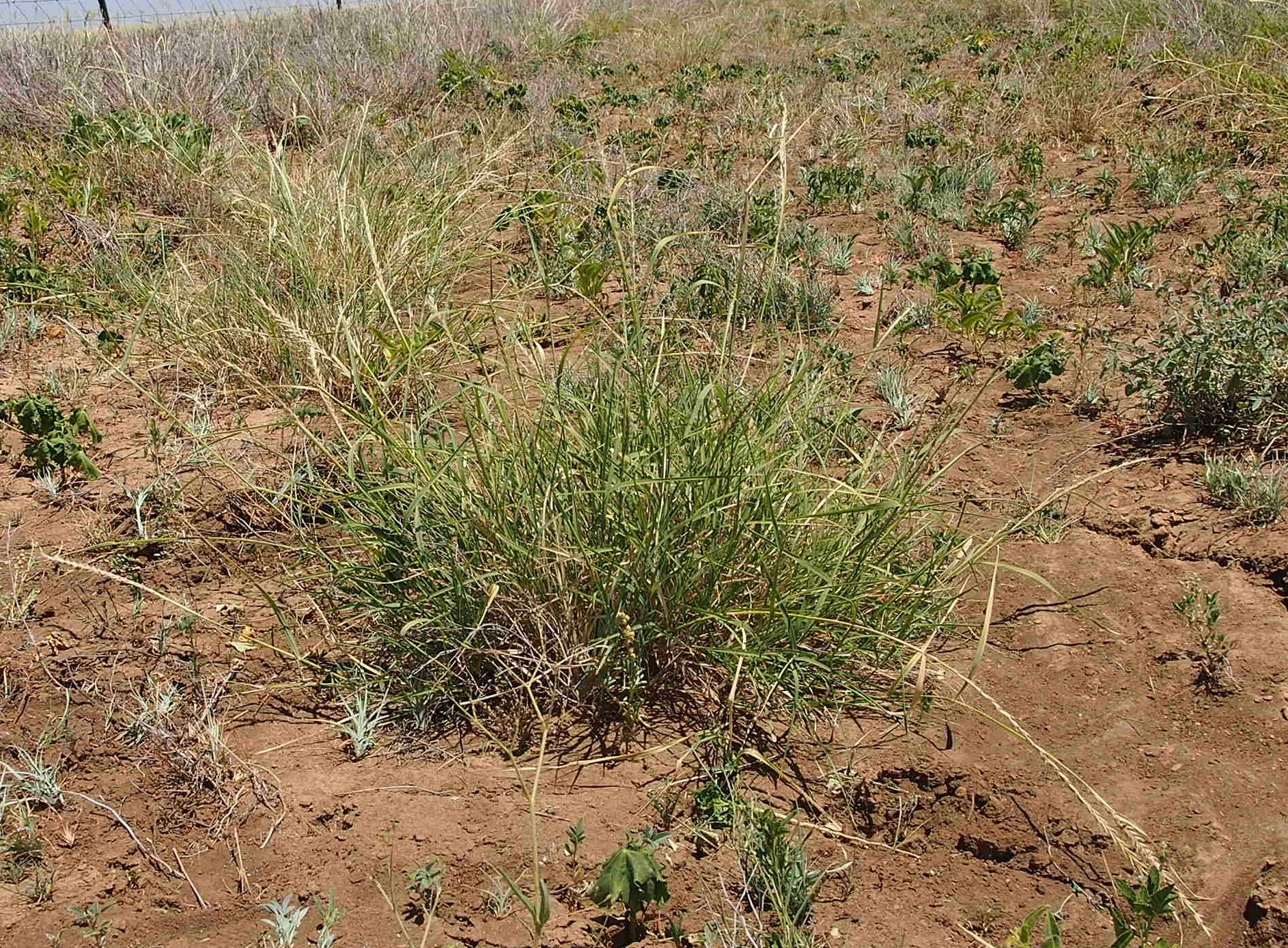

Scientific classification
- Kingdom: Plantae
- Clade: Tracheophytes
- Clade: Angiosperms
- Clade: Monocots
- Clade: Commelinids
- Order: Poales
- Family: Poaceae
- Subfamily: Chloridoideae
- Genus: Astrebla
- Species: A. pectinata

Binomial name
- Astrebla pectinata (Lindl.) F. Muell. ex Benth.

= Astrebla pectinata =

Species of grass

Astrebla pectinata, commonly known as barley Mitchell grass, is a herb of the family Poaceae from the order Poales.

== Description ==
Astrebla pectinata grows to 1 metre (3 1/2 ft). The flowers are pollinated by wind and are hermaphrodites, having both male and female organs.

== Distribution and habitat ==
It mostly prefers moist soil and also can grow in partial shade. The species is considered to be the most balanced and economically important herbage in the semiarid areas of eastern Australia. It is a warm-season perennial grass. It is palatable to livestock even when it is dry.

== Ecology ==
It is palatable to livestock even when it is dry.
