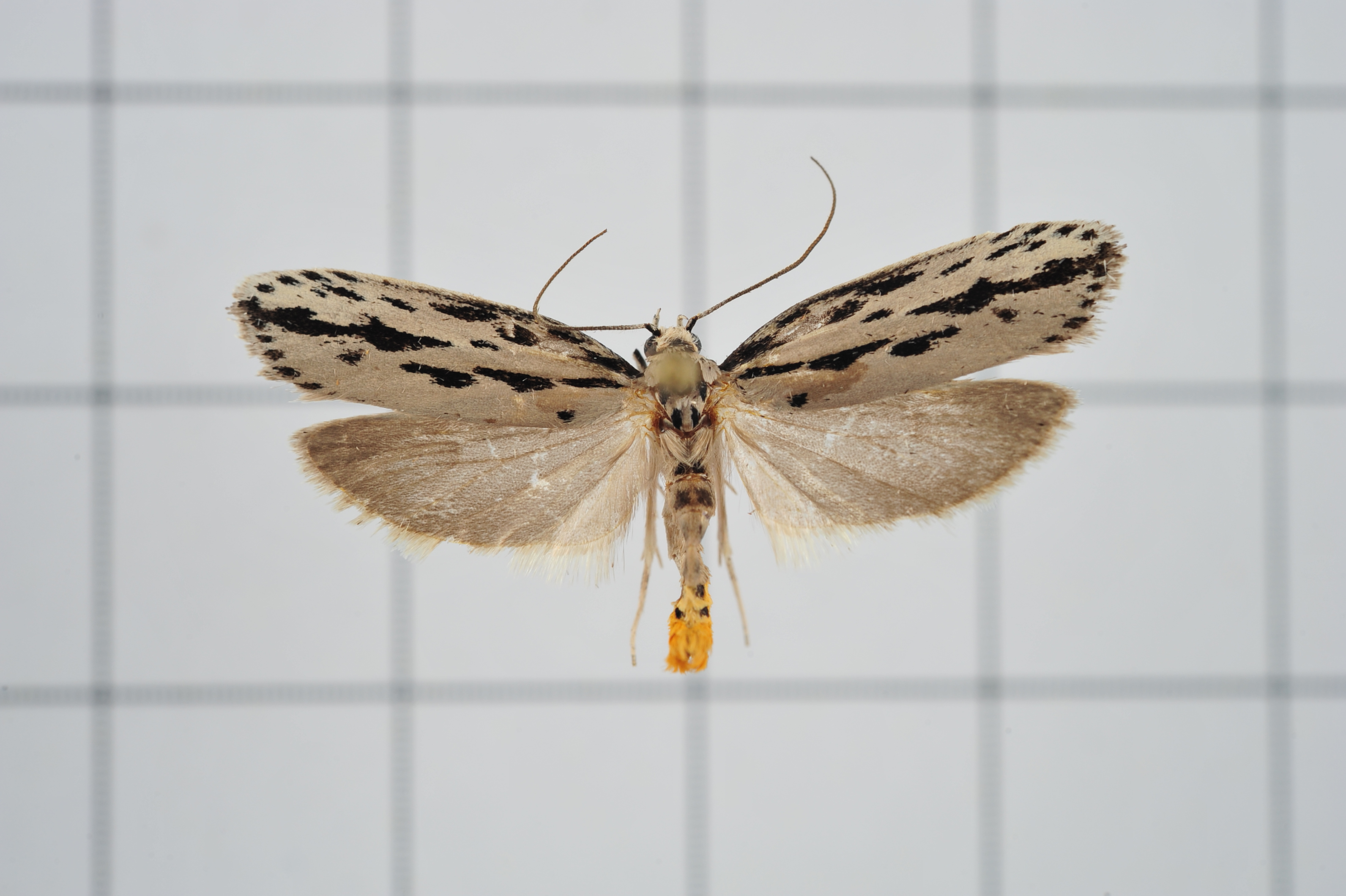

Scientific classification
- Kingdom: Animalia
- Phylum: Arthropoda
- Class: Insecta
- Order: Lepidoptera
- Family: Depressariidae
- Genus: Ethmia
- Species: E. maculata

Binomial name
- Ethmia maculata Sattler, 1967

= Ethmia maculata =

Species of moth

Ethmia maculata is a moth in the family Depressariidae. It is found in China and Taiwan.

The larvae feed on Ehretia dicksonii.
