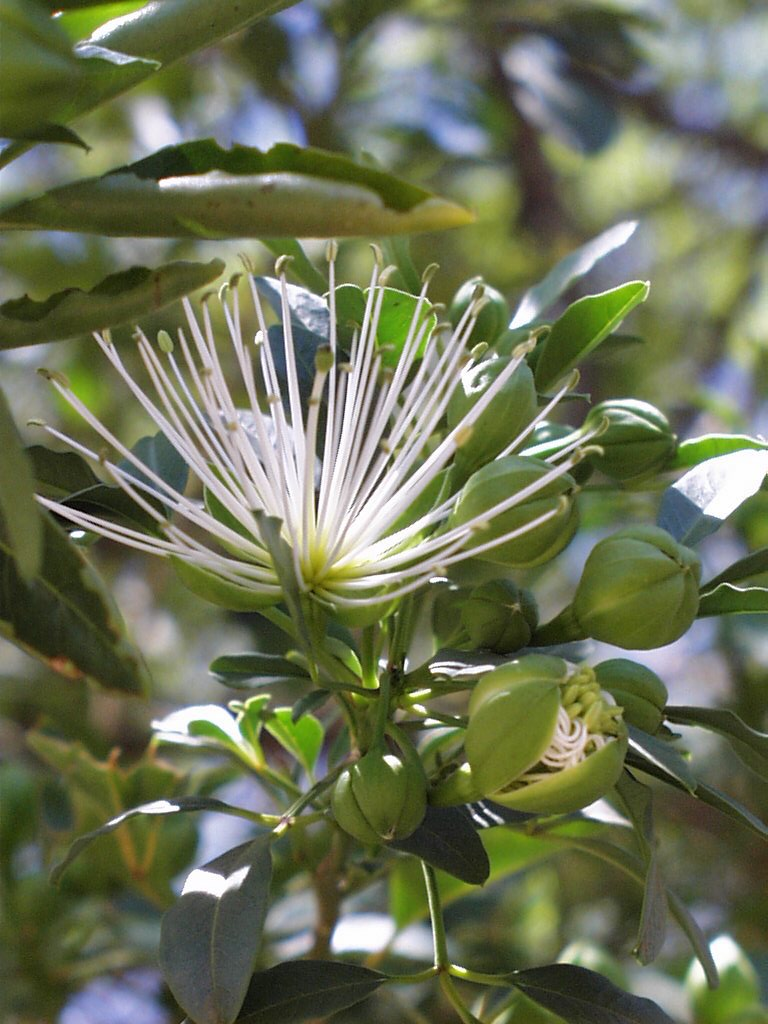

Scientific classification
- Kingdom: Plantae
- Clade: Tracheophytes
- Clade: Angiosperms
- Clade: Eudicots
- Clade: Rosids
- Order: Brassicales
- Family: Capparaceae
- Genus: Maerua
- Species: M. afra

Binomial name
- Maerua afra (DC.) Pax

Synonyms
- Maerua cafra (DC.) nomen rejectum; Maerua triphylla (Thunb.) T.Durand & Schinz; Niebuhria triphylla (Thunb.) H.L.Wendl.; Capparis triphylla Thunb.; Crateva avicularis Burch.; Niebuhria avicularis DC.; Niebuhria oleoides DC.

= Maerua afra =

Species of tree

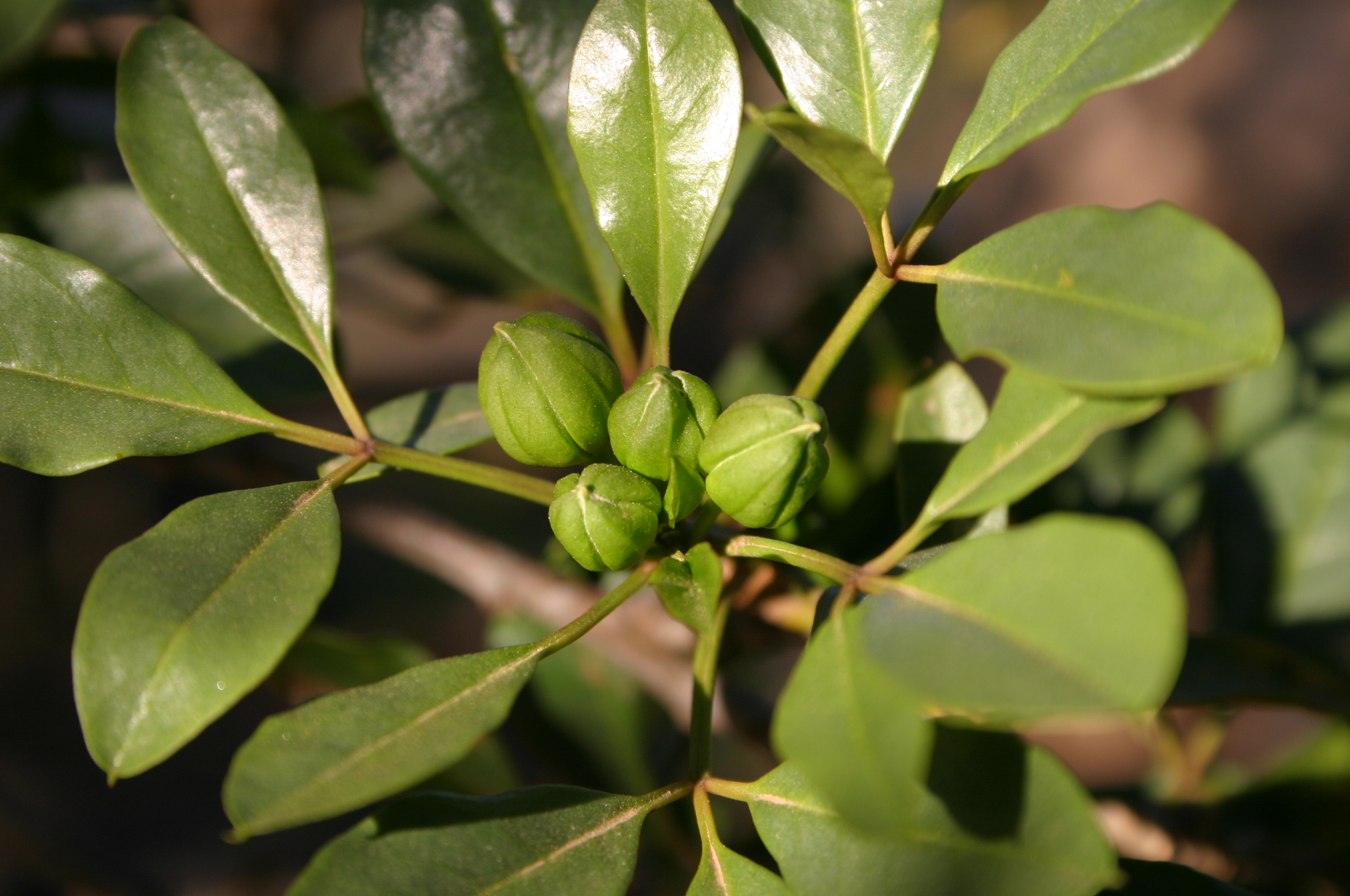
Flower buds

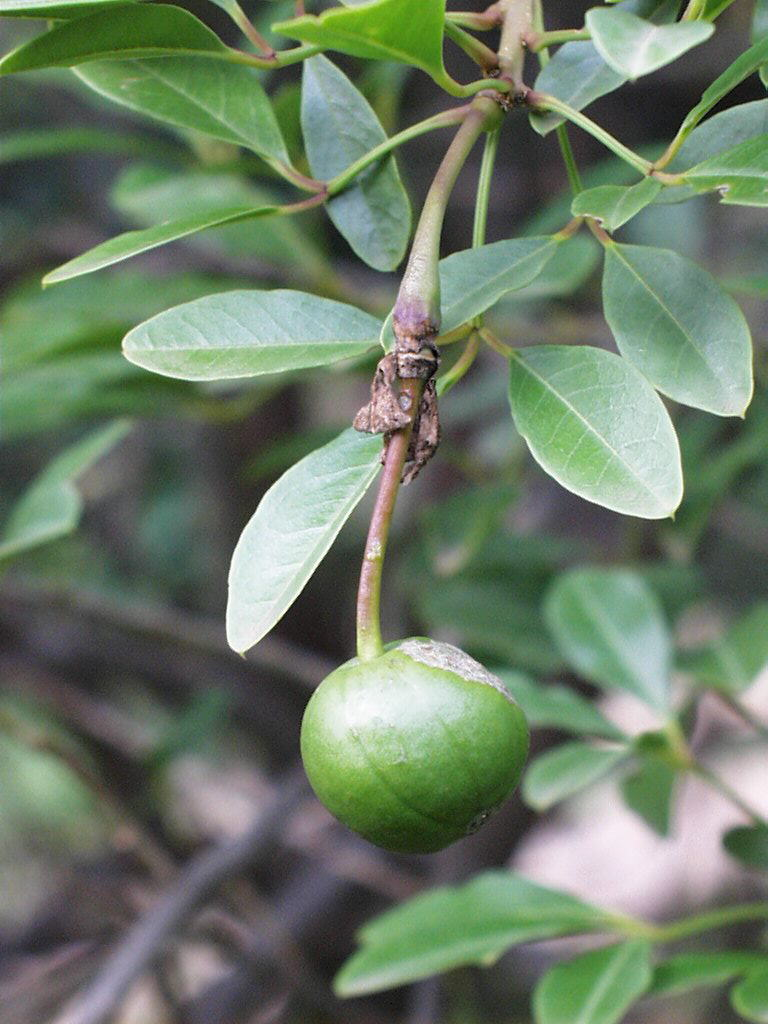
Fruit

Maerua afra (DC.) Pax is a small Southern African tree belonging to Capparaceae, the caper family, occurring eastwards along the coast from Knysna, then further inland and northwards through KwaZulu-Natal and Eswatini to the Transvaal, southern Mozambique and southern Zimbabwe. The genus Maerua comprises about 60 species found in Africa and Asia.

It may reach about 8 metres (26 ft) in height and occurs in dune bush, open woodland or on forest fringes. The leaves are digitately compound with from 3 to 5 leaflets, with entire, ciliate margins and petiolules of only 10 millimetres (0.4 in) or less in length, while the petiole may be up to 60 mm (2.4 in) long. The apex of the median leaflet may be apiculate and vary from broadly acute to rounded. The scented flowers are in terminal clusters with numerous white stamens tinged with green, though petals are absent. The four sepals are greenish in colour and about 17 mm (0.7 in) long, while the stamens are intricately folded in the unopened bud. A single gynophore protrudes from amongst the stamens in the open flower. The fruit is plum-like (oblong-ovoid), up to 50 mm (2.0 in) long, slightly ribbed with longitudinal suture lines clearly visible, and pendent from the gynophore and peduncle. When ripe, it remains green in colour, becoming wrinkled, soft and fragrant, and consumed by many species of bird. The fruit has a thick rind and holds up to 30 flattened, reniform seeds, distributed irregularly in a jelly-like pulp. The grey to dark brown bark, in common with many of this family, is generously covered in lenticels. Branches and trunks are often markedly flattened rather than round. The wood is brittle and said to have a disagreeable odour when cut. In the past, the roots have been ground up for use as a chicory substitute in coffee, and a decoction of roots for curbing menorrhagia and against female infertility.

This species is one of the many Capparaceae host to the larvae of Belenois aurota, the Brown-veined White butterfly which migrates northwards across Southern Africa in large numbers at certain times of the year. Pinacopteryx eriphia larvae also feed on this species, as do those of Colotis antevippe – all these butterfly species belong to the family Pieridae.

== Gallery ==
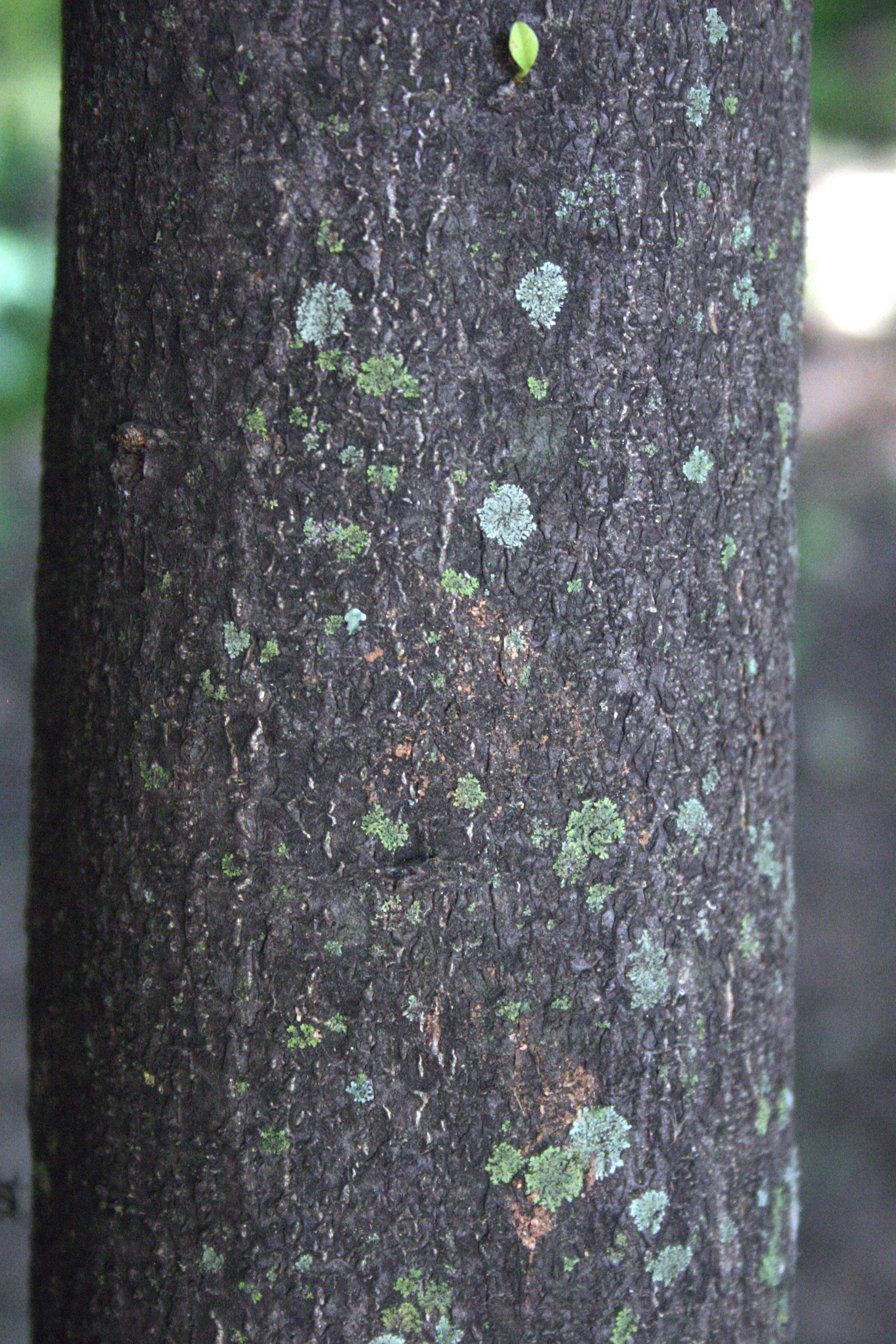
Bark

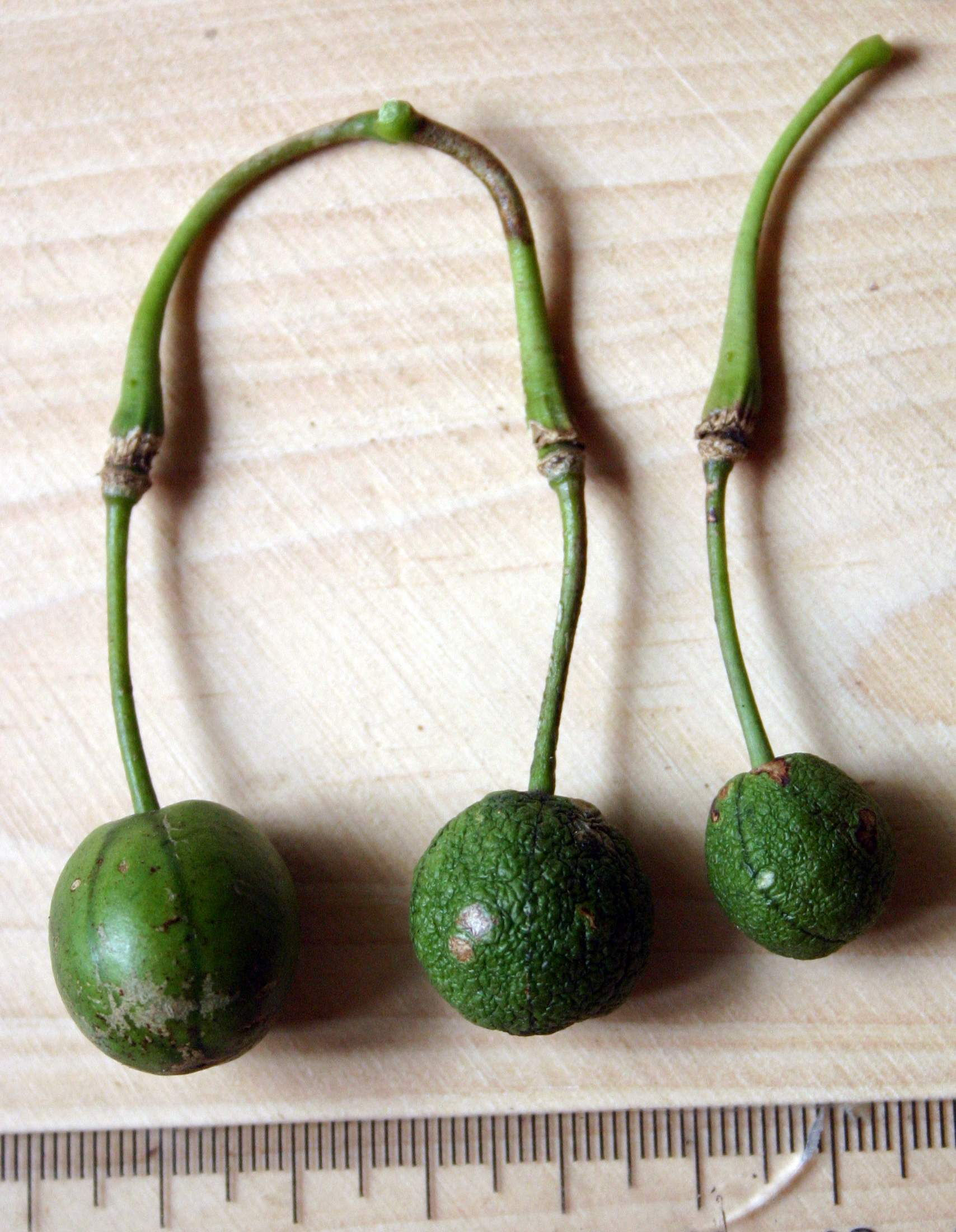
Fruits

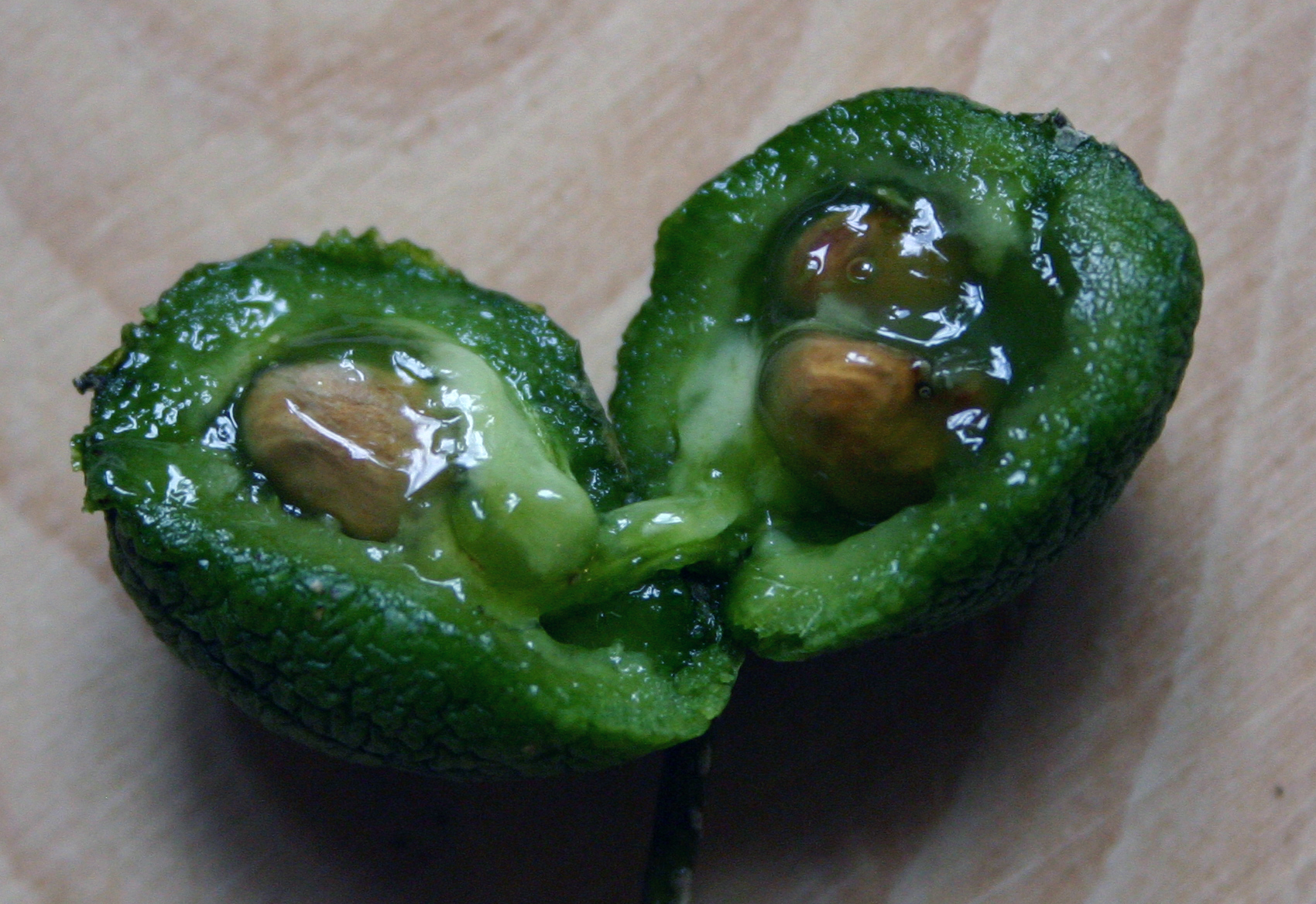
Sectioned fruit

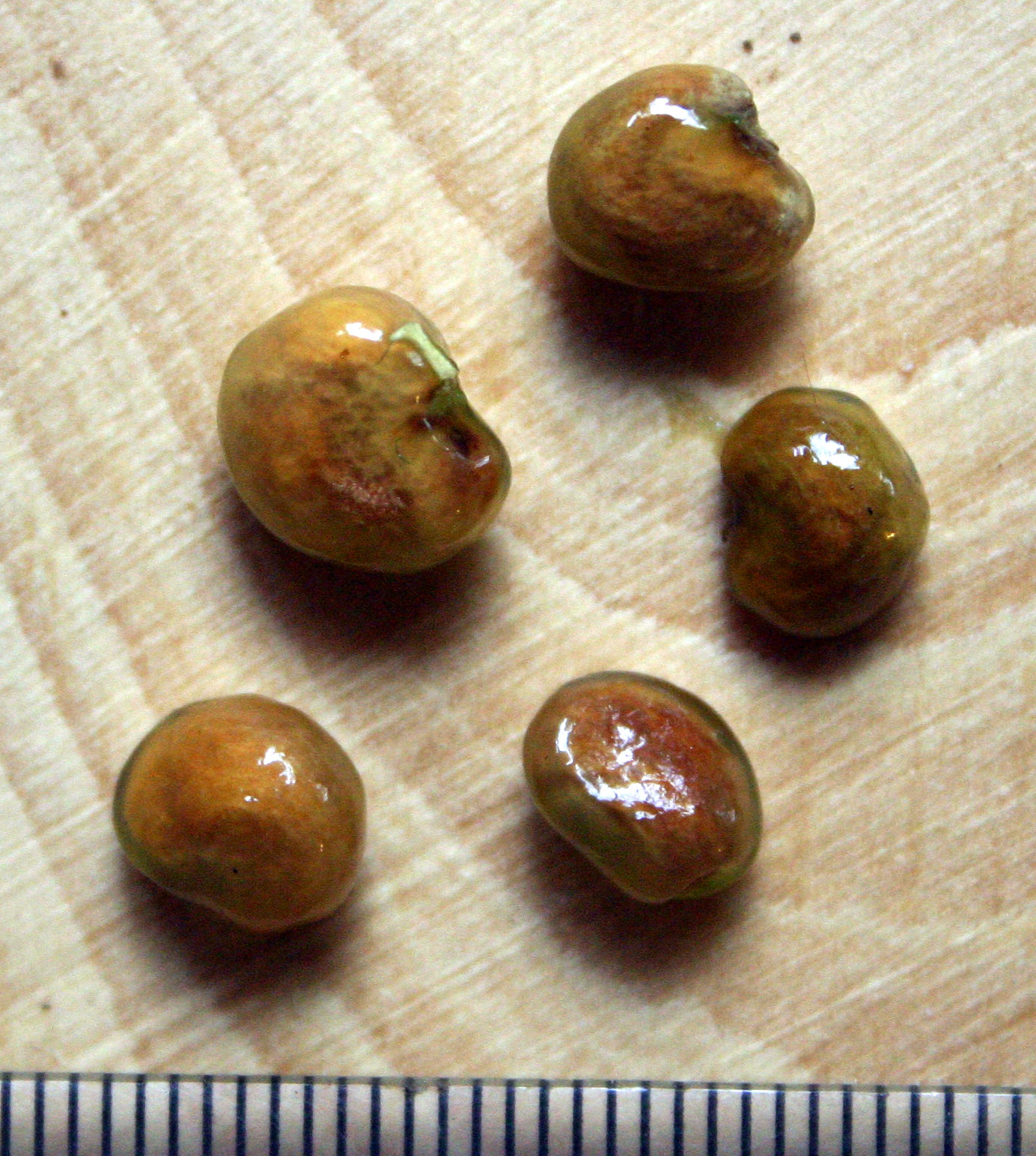
Seeds
