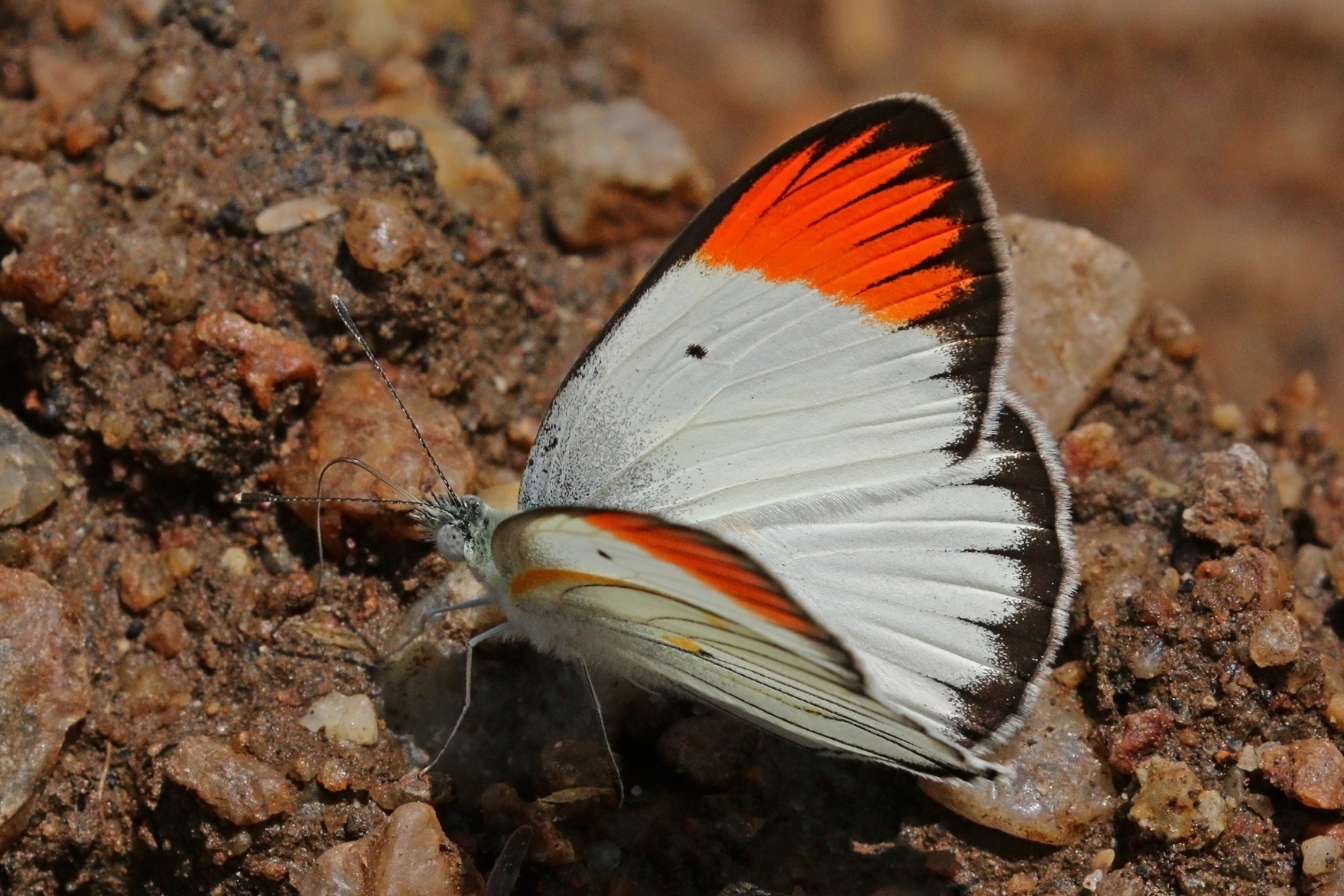
- Male Colotis antevippe exole Semliki Wildlife Reserve, Uganda

Conservation status
- Least Concern (IUCN 3.1)

Scientific classification
- Kingdom: Animalia
- Phylum: Arthropoda
- Clade: Pancrustacea
- Class: Insecta
- Order: Lepidoptera
- Family: Pieridae
- Genus: Colotis
- Species: C. antevippe

Binomial name
- Colotis antevippe (Boisduval, 1836)

Synonyms
- Anthocharis antevippe Boisduval, 1836; Teracolus carteri Butler, 1882; Anthopsyche gavisa Wallengren, 1857; Papilio achine Stoll, 1781; Teracolus harmonides Butler, 1876; Teracolus ithonus Butler, 1876; Teracolus hippocrene Butler, 1876; Teracolus ignifer Butler, 1876; Teracolus simplex Butler, 1876; Teracolus hyperides Butler, 1876; Teracolus hero Butler, 1876; Teracolus trimeni Butler, 1876; Callosune damarensis Aurivillius, 1879; Teracolus fumidus Swinhoe, 1884; Callosune haevernicki Staudinger, 1885; Teracolus luederitzi Suffert, 1904; Colotis subgavisa Dufrane, 1947; Anthocharis zera Lucas, 1852; Teracolus helle Butler, 1876; Teracolus subvenosus Butler, 1883; Teracolus laura Sharpe, 1890; Teracolus achine var. antevippe ab. sulphurea Rebel, 1914; Teracolus achine f. clarescens Joicey and Talbot, 1927; Colotis antevippe f. rosanides Stoneham, 1957; Colotis antevippe f. castanoides Stoneham, 1957; Colotis antevippe f. roseata Stoneham, 1957; Colotis antevippe f. leander Stoneham, 1957; Colotis antevippe f. subalba Stoneham, 1957; Colotis antevippe f. rosaflava Stoneham, 1957; Colotis antevippe f. rosamaria Stoneham, 1957; Colotis antevippe f. rosalindae Stoneham, 1957; Colotis antevippe f. rosareducta Stoneham, 1957; Colotis antevippe f. citrinella Stoneham, 1957; Colotis antevippe f. flavinella Stoneham, 1957; Colotis antevippe f. flavireducta Stoneham, 1957; Colotis antevippe f. albissima Stoneham, 1957

= Colotis antevippe =

Species of butterfly

Colotis antevippe, the red tip, is a butterfly of the family Pieridae. It is found in the Afrotropical realm.

The wingspan is 40–45 mm. The adults fly year-round.

The larvae feed on Boscia albitrunca, Boscia oleoides, Capparis sepiara, Maerua cafra, and Maerua juncea.

== Subspecies ==
The following subspecies are recognised:

- C. a. antevippe (Mauritania, Senegal, Gambia, Mali, Guinea-Bissau, Guinea, Burkina Faso, Ghana, Benin, northern Nigeria, Niger, northern Cameroon)
- C. a. zera (Lucas, 1852) (Sudan, Ethiopia, Uganda, Kenya, northern and western Tanzania, Democratic Republic of the Congo, south-western Saudi Arabia, Yemen, Oman)
- C. a. gavisa (Wallengren, 1857) (Angola, Democratic Republic of the Congo, southern Tanzania, Malawi, Zambia, Mozambique, Zimbabwe, Botswana, Namibia, South Africa, Eswatini)

Torben Larsen developed a species numbering system for his 2005 publication Butterflies of West Africa. The nominate subspecies is #62. The 'Larsen' numbers have since been used with permission in A Sharp Eye on Butterflies of Ghana.

== Gallery ==
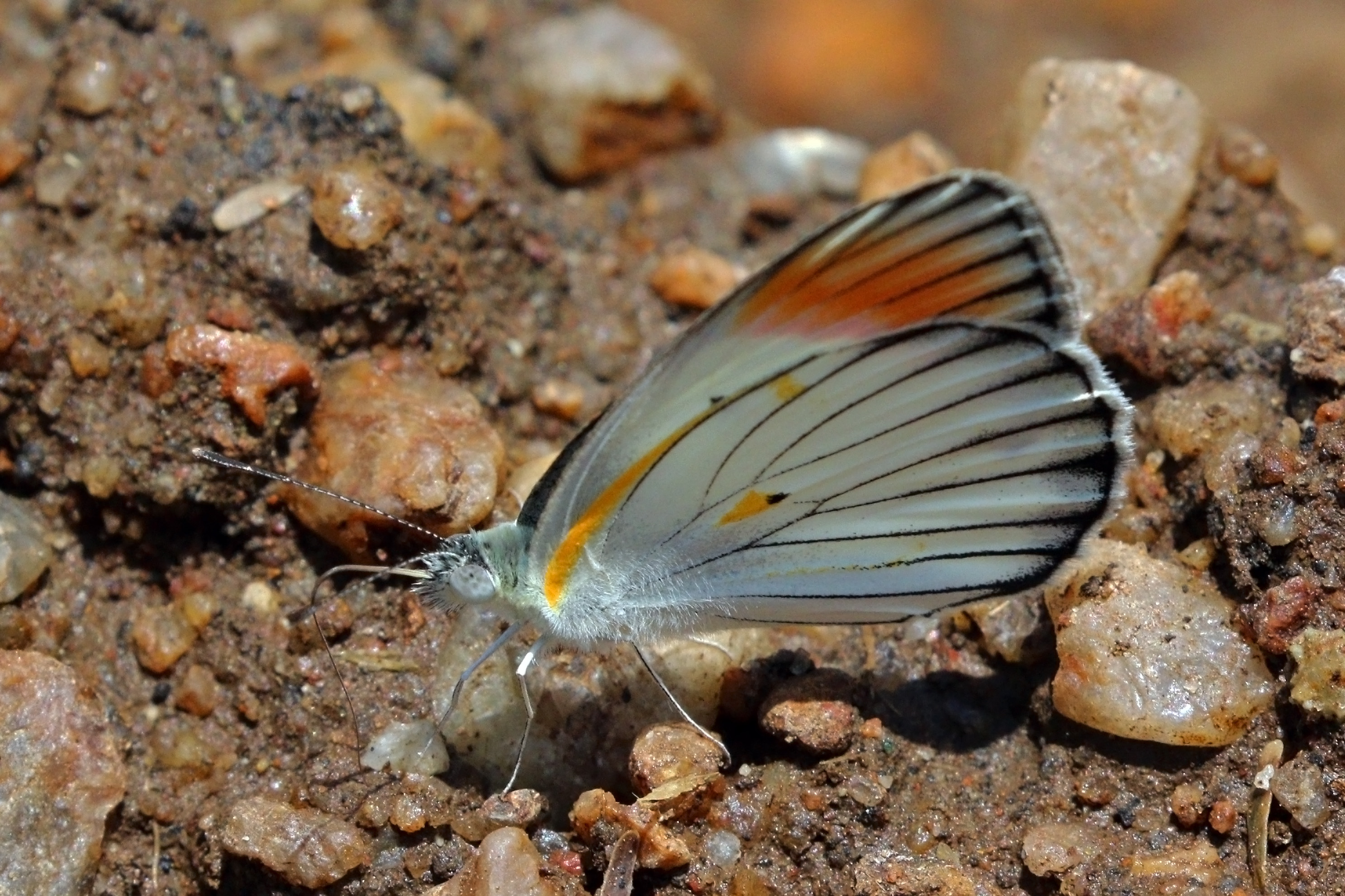
Male C. a. exole
Semliki Wildlife Reserve, Uganda

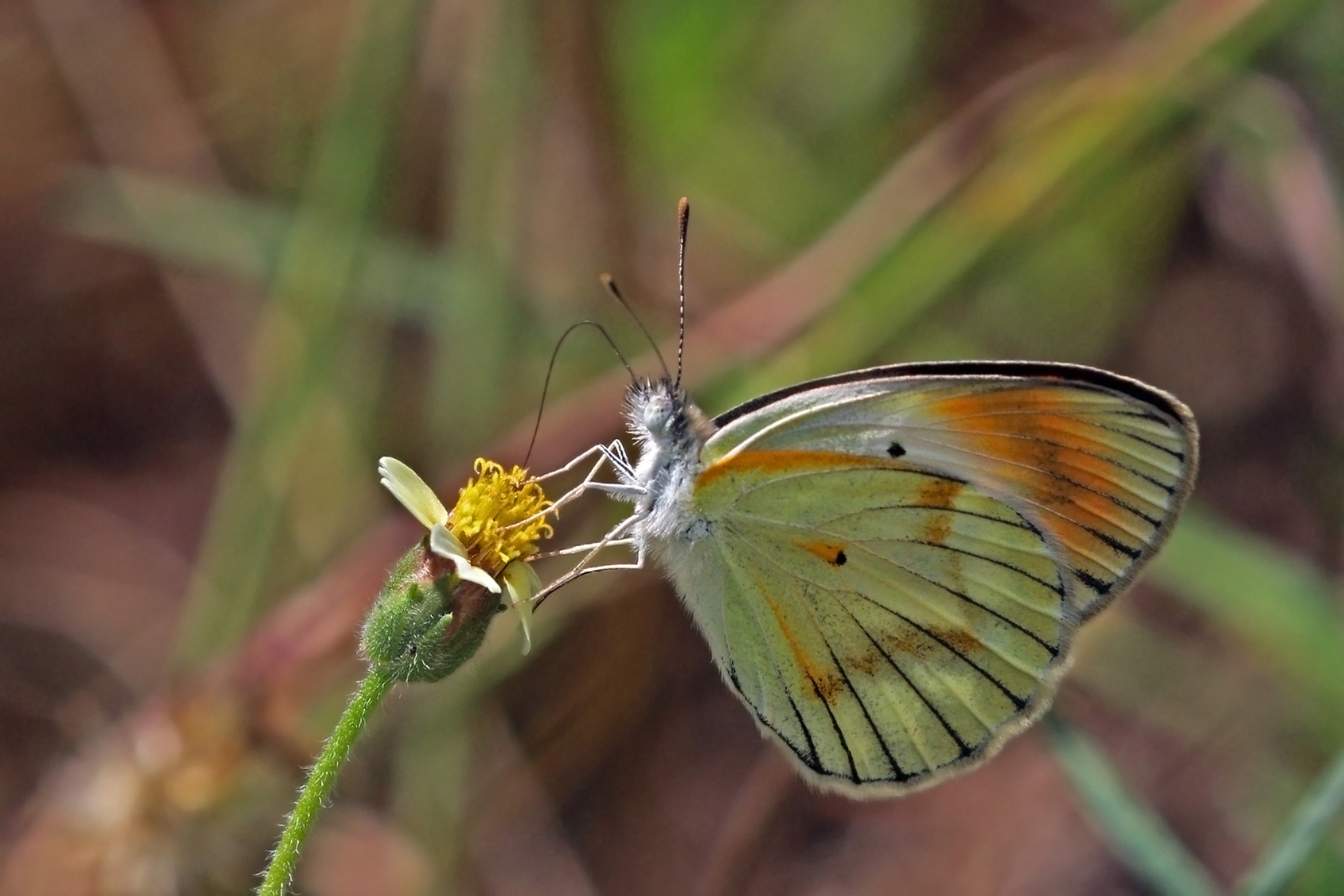
Female C. a. exole
Semliki Wildlife Reserve, Uganda
