= Maerua scandens =

Conservation status
- Data Deficient (IUCN 3.1)

Scientific classification
- Kingdom: Plantae
- Clade: Tracheophytes
- Clade: Angiosperms
- Clade: Eudicots
- Clade: Rosids
- Order: Brassicales
- Family: Capparaceae
- Genus: Maerua
- Species: M. scandens

Binomial name
- Maerua scandens (Klotzsch) Gilg

Species of flowering plant

Maerua scandens is a species of plant in the Capparaceae family. It is endemic to Mozambique.
