= Maerua acuminata =

Conservation status
- Data Deficient (IUCN 2.3)

Scientific classification
- Kingdom: Plantae
- Clade: Tracheophytes
- Clade: Angiosperms
- Clade: Eudicots
- Clade: Rosids
- Order: Brassicales
- Family: Capparaceae
- Genus: Maerua
- Species: M. acuminata

Binomial name
- Maerua acuminata Oliv.

Species of flowering plant

Maerua acuminata is a species of plant in the Capparaceae family. It is found in Mozambique and Tanzania.
