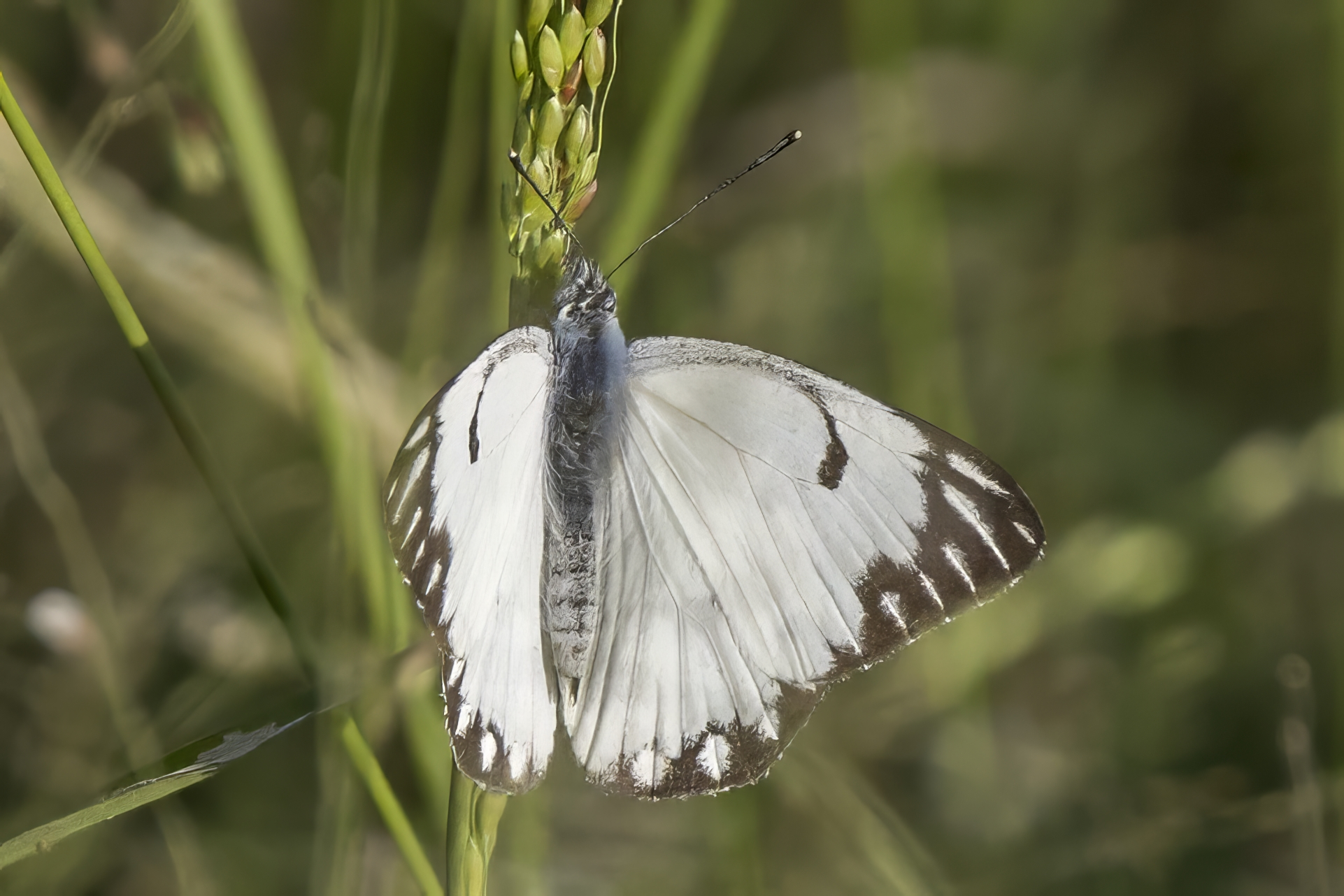
- Male B. a. aurota Kruger National Park, South Africa
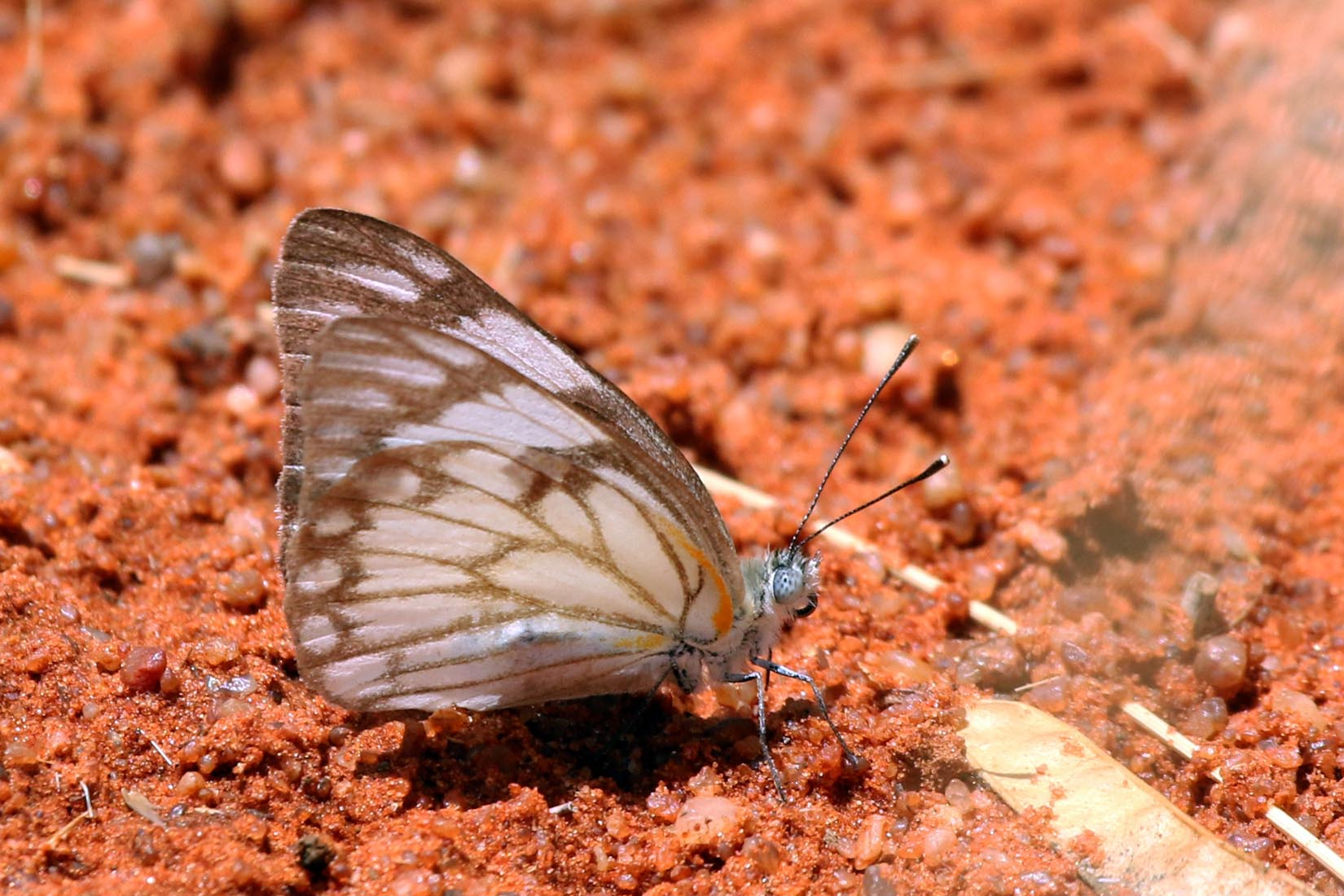
- Female B. a. aurota Tswalu Kalahari Reserve, South Africa

Conservation status
- Least Concern (IUCN 3.1)

Scientific classification
- Kingdom: Animalia
- Phylum: Arthropoda
- Clade: Pancrustacea
- Class: Insecta
- Order: Lepidoptera
- Family: Pieridae
- Genus: Belenois
- Species: B. aurota

Binomial name
- Belenois aurota (Fabricius, 1793)

Synonyms
- Papilio aurota Fabricius, 1793; Anaphaeis aurota; Papilio mesentina Cramer, 1780; Papilio augusta Olivier, 1807; Pinacopteryx syrinx Wallengren, 1860; Pieris lordaca Walker, 1870; Belenois auriginea Butler, 1886; Pieris mesentina ab. iris Gauckler, 1912; Pieris mesentina ab. sulphurea Gauckler, 1912; Pieris mesentina f. pusillima Strand, 1915; Pieris mesentina ab. punctifera Hulstaert, 1924

= Belenois aurota =

Pioneer white

Species of butterfly

Belenois aurota, the pioneer or pioneer white or caper white, is a small to medium-sized butterfly of the family Pieridae—that is, the yellows and whites—which is found in South Asia, West Asia and Africa. In Africa, it is also known as the brown-veined white, and is well known during summer and autumn when large numbers migrate north-east over the interior.

== Description ==
=== Wet-season form ===
The upperside of males is white with the forewing having the costa from base to base of vein 11 dusky black and then jet black continuing into a widened and curving short streak along the discocellulars to the lower apex of the cell; apical area diagonally with the termen black, the former with six elongate outwardly pointed spots of the ground colour enclosed one in each of the interspaces 3, 4, 5, 6, 8, and 9. Hindwing: uniform, the black along the venation on the underside seen through by transparency; termen between veins 2 and 6 somewhat broadly black, with a series of four round spots of the ground colour in the interspaces; below vein 2 and above vein 6 the termen is very narrowly black. Underside: forewing white, markings similar, more clearly defined, the white spots within the black apical area larger. Hindwing: yellowish white, all the veins very broadly bordered with black; interspaces 1, 2, 6, and 7 with crossbars of black, beyond which there is a subterminal, somewhat broad, transverse band of black between veins 2 and 6. Cilia of both forewings and hindwings white alternated with black. The ground colour on both upper and undersides variable, often cream coloured above; beneath: in some specimens, the base of cell and the elongate spots in apical area of forewing, and the whole surface of the hindwing varies to rich chrome yellow.

Female similar; the black markings on both upper and undersides broader, the white spots on black apical area of forewing often sub-obsolete above.

Antennae in both sexes black, sparsely sprinkled with white dots; head, thorax and abdomen above and below white: thorax above often bluish grey.

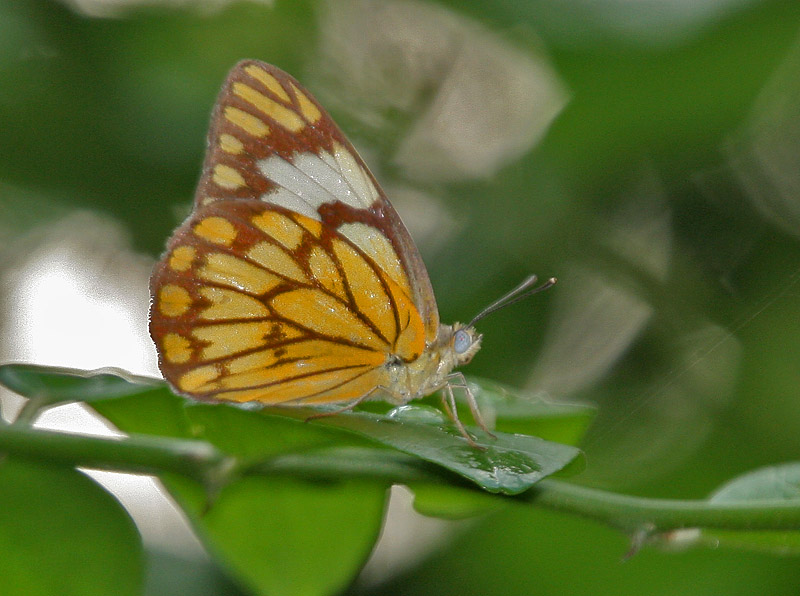
Wet-season form in Kolkata, West Bengal, India

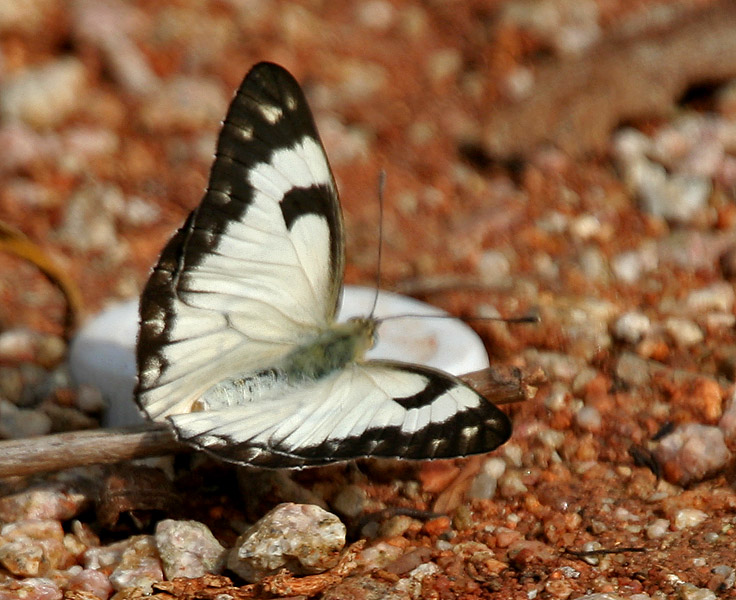
Wet-season form in Hyderabad, India

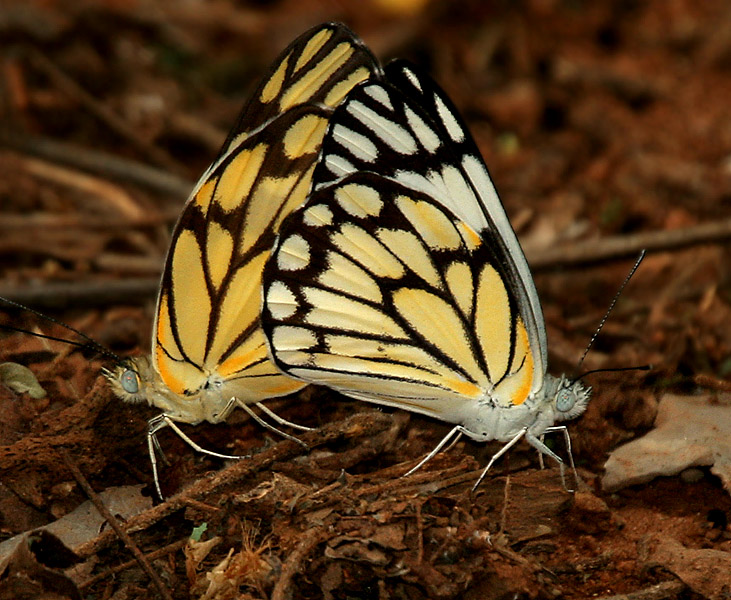
Wet-season form mating in Hyderabad, India

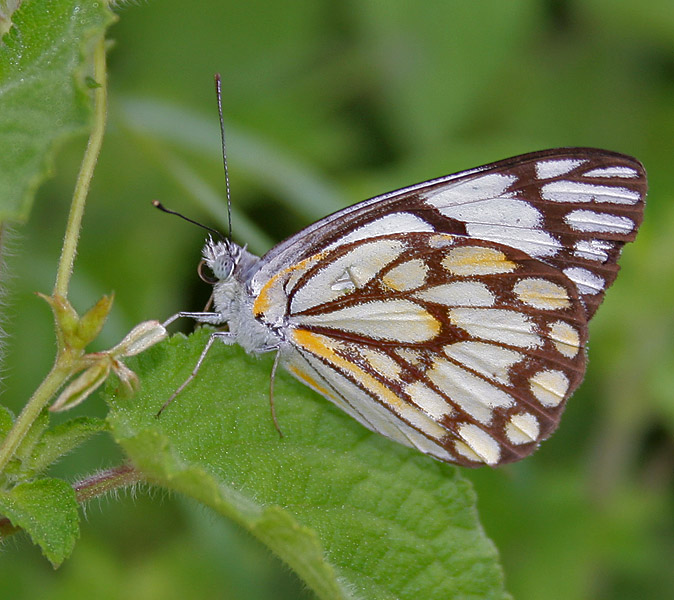
Wet-season form in Hyderabad, India

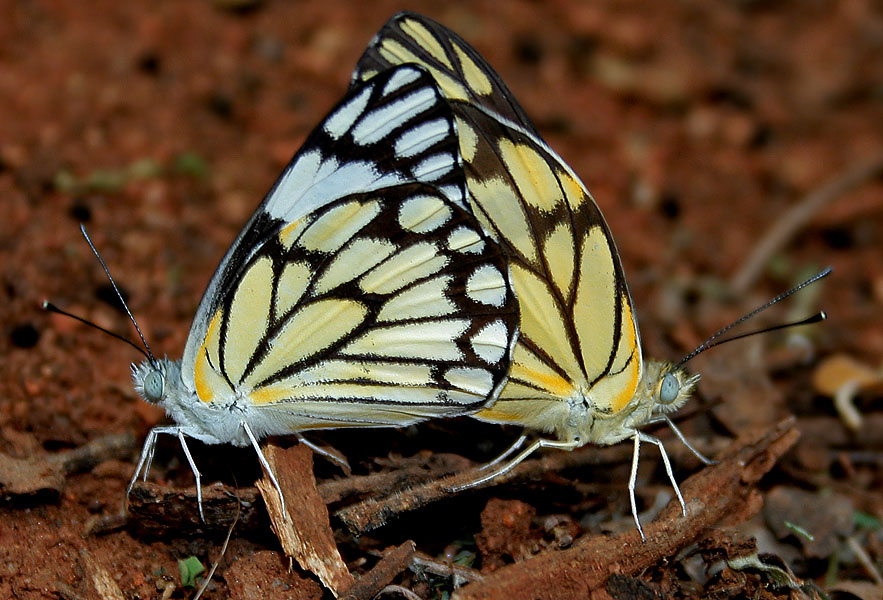
Wet-season form mating in Hyderabad, India

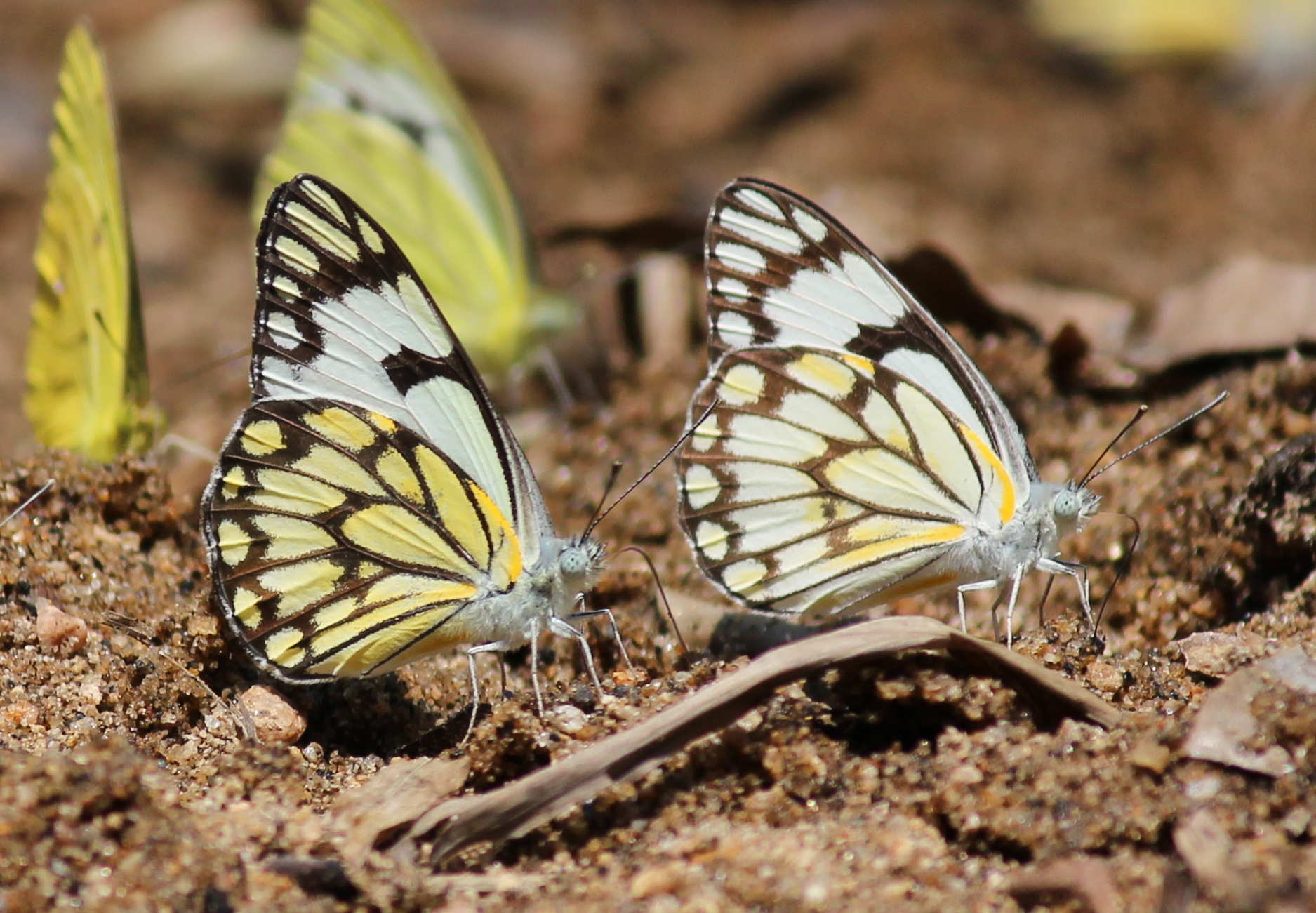
Mudpuddling in Chinnar WLS Kerala, India

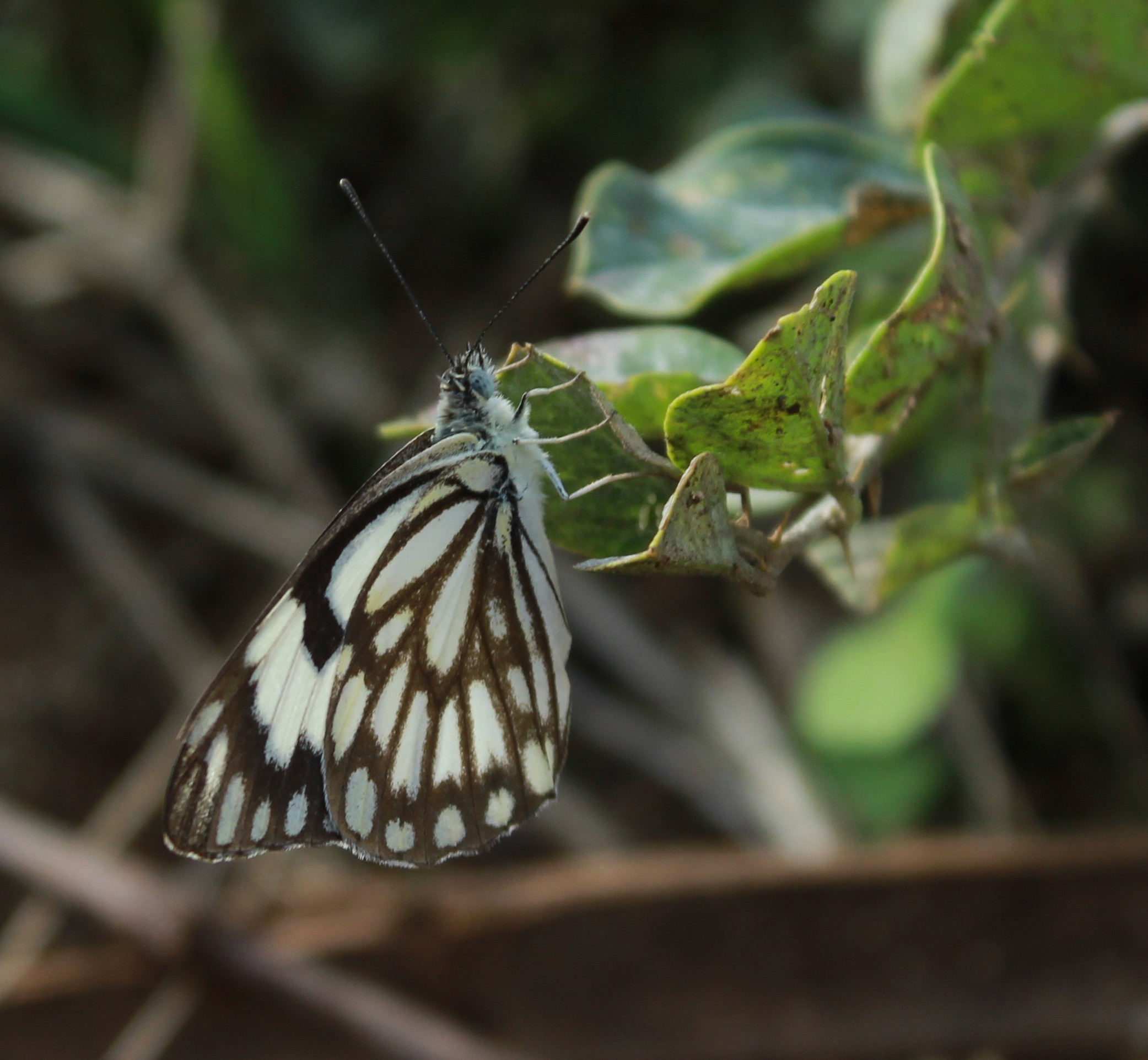
Wet-season form in Beit She'an Valley, Israel

=== Dry-season form ===
The dry-season form is similar to the wet-season form but on the upperside the black markings are narrower, the white markings on the black apical area of forewing broader and longer, and on the hindwing the narrow inner margining to the black on the termen very narrow, somewhat obsolescent; therefore, the white subterminal spots have the appearance of opening inwards. Underside: ground colour almost pure white; on the hindwing slightly tinged with yellow. Antennae, head, thorax, and abdomen as in the wet-season form.

Wingspan of 44–62 mm.

Race taprobana, Moore (Sri Lanka) differs from the typical form as follows: Male upperside, forewing: deep black on apical area, the enclosed white elongate spots more or less obsolete. Hindwing: the black terminal border much broader and of a deeper black, the enclosed white spots, except the spot in interspace 6, very much smaller, somewhat obsolescent, sometimes absent in interspace 4. Underside: similar to the upperside, the markings of a very intense black and broader, the enclosed spots in the apical area of forewing, the white of the cell and the area along the upper half of the wing generally overlaid with rich chrome yellow. Hindwing: ground colour a deep rich chrome yellow, the spots on it enclosed in the black along terminal margin subhastate (somewhat spear shaped), the spot in interspace 4 absent.

The female is similar to the male on both upper and undersides, but in most specimens, on the upperside, the spots of the white ground colour that are enclosed in the black apical area of the forewing and the spots on the black border along the terminal margin of the hindwing are entirely absent.

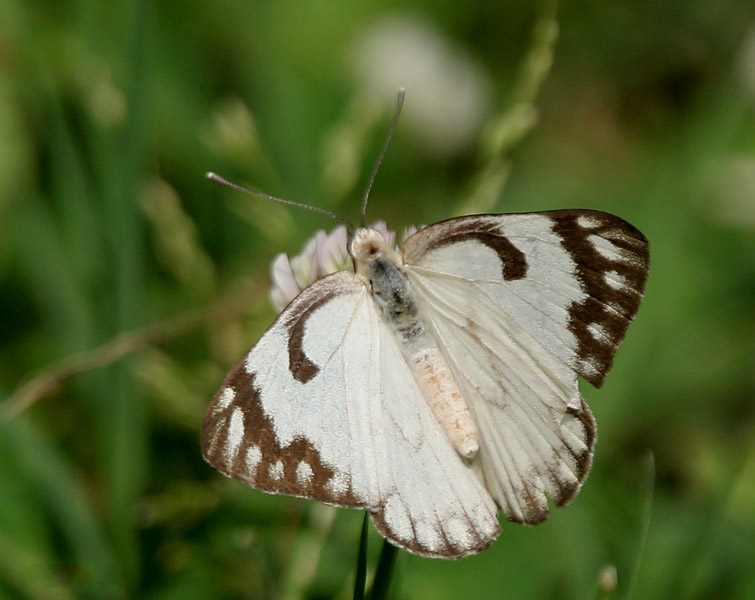
Dry-season form in Kullu District of Himachal Pradesh, India

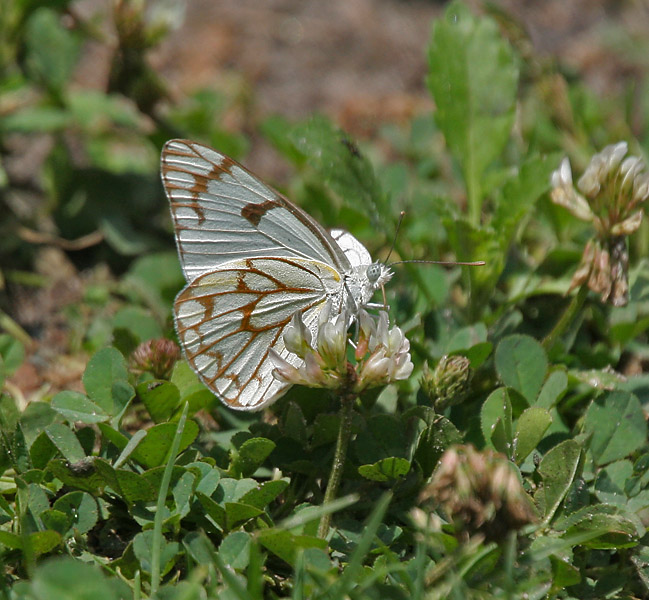
Dry-season form in Kullu District of Himachal Pradesh, India

== Distribution ==
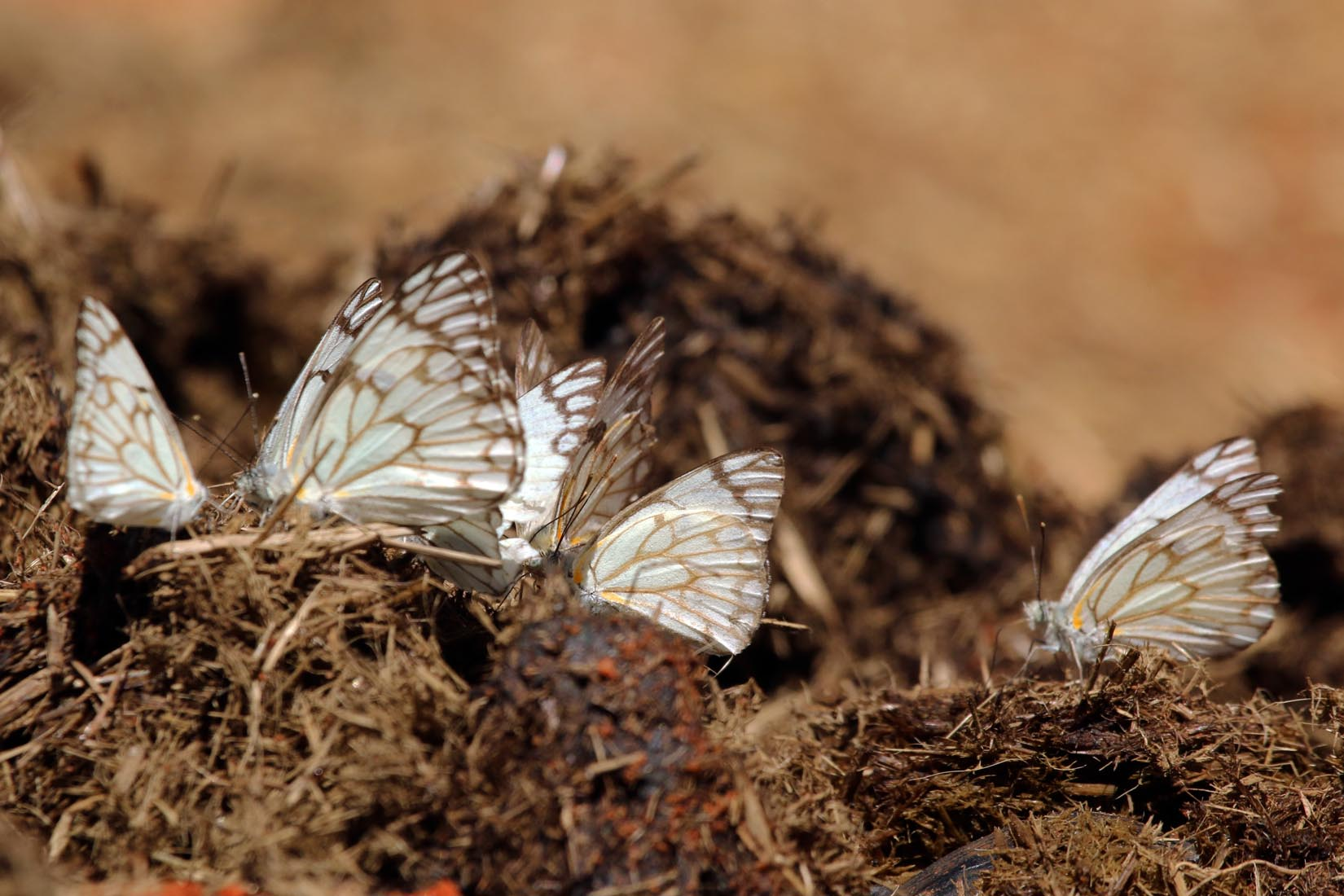
B. a. aurota on white rhino dung in Tswalu Kalahari Reserve, South Africa

The species lives in Sri Lanka, the Himalayas from Kashmir to Sikkim at elevations below 6,000 feet (1,800 m), and through the plains to southern India. In the Nilgiris observed up to 8,000 feet (2,400 m) (George Hampson). To the west it spreads through Persia and Arabia to East Africa. The species occurs over the greater part of Sub-Saharan Africa.

== Life cycle ==
Food plants of the larvae include Capparis zeylanica. In Africa, the host plants are almost exclusively from the family Capparaceae and in particular the genera Boscia, Maerua and Capparis. Eggs are laid in batches of 20 or so, while the newly hatched larvae are gregarious.

=== Larva ===
When hatched a line long, olive colour, with a distinct glossy jet-black head. After first moult. One fourth inch long; grass-green; dorsal line very distinct, dark green; lateral line very broad, plum-coloured and mottled, dentated into the ground-colour, on the last two segments on its upperside; a small white spot on either side of dorsal line on each segment; a yellow spot on each segment on the lateral line on either side; abdomen glossy green; ventral line distinct, rather interrupted, grass-green; all the legs green, hairy; head shiny black with a green triangular mark in front, covered with stiff whitish hairs; stigmata dark-coloured; sides greyish green, slightly wrinkled transversely; the portion of ground-colour between lateral and dorsal line slightly powdered with yellow; hair whitish grey; anal segment black and hairy; first segment rather swollen in front. After last moult length 1.25 inch long; cylindrical, broader towards the head, slightly tomentose on back, hairy on the sides; otherwise as after first moult. Food plant, the pea-leaved caper (Capparis pyrifolia).

— Capt. H. L. Chaumette quoted in Moore and republished by Bingham 1907

=== Pupa ===
Five-eighths of an inch long, transparent, pale cream-colour. In front a longish tubercle directed forwards, with a black mark on each side, and a smaller one on either side of 4th segment perfectly black; a lateral line of pale plum-colour, on which is a longitudinal line of yellow round dots, one on each segment, and a transverse row of dots on each segment; dashed and marked with black, particularly on the abdomen. After the escape of the imago, the 5th and 6th segments of the pupa become blood-red.

— Capt. H. L. Chaumette quoted in Moore and republished by Bingham, 1907

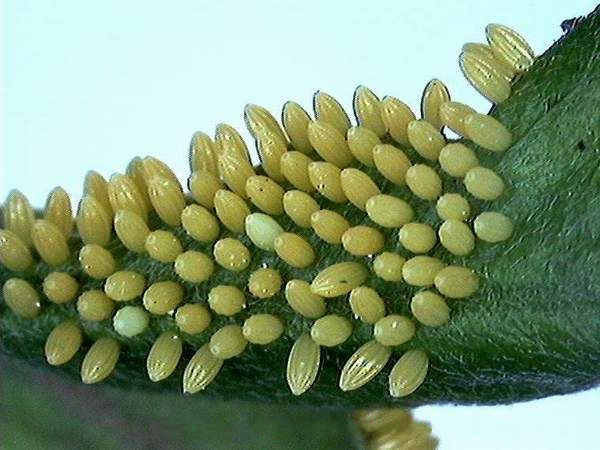
Eggs

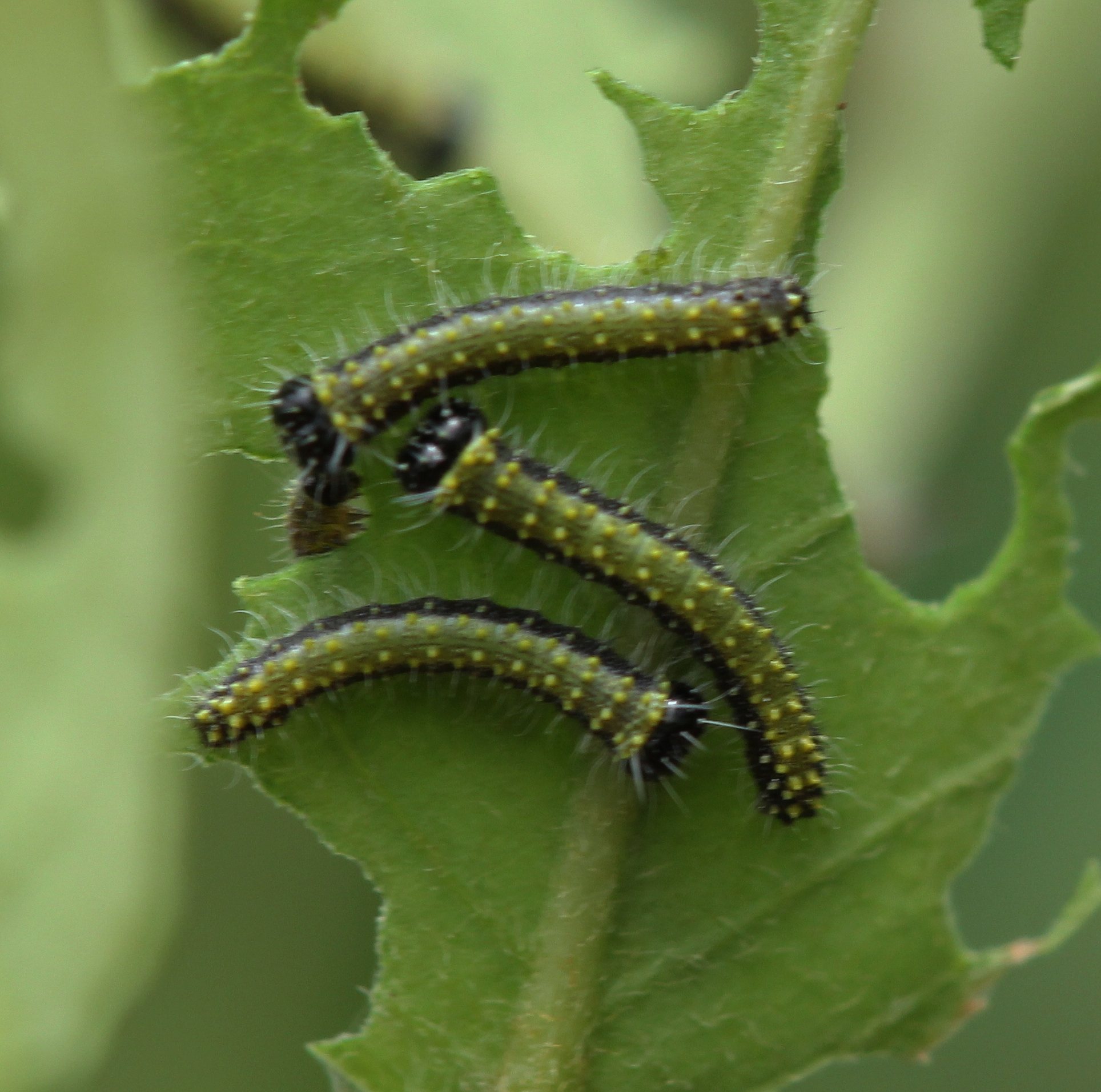
Early instar caterpillars

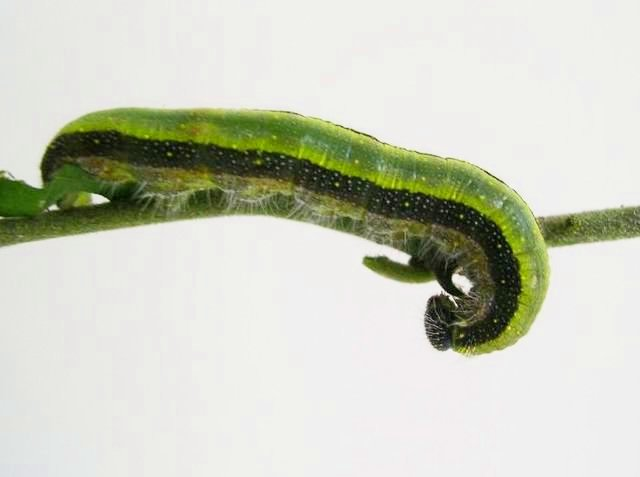
Caterpillar

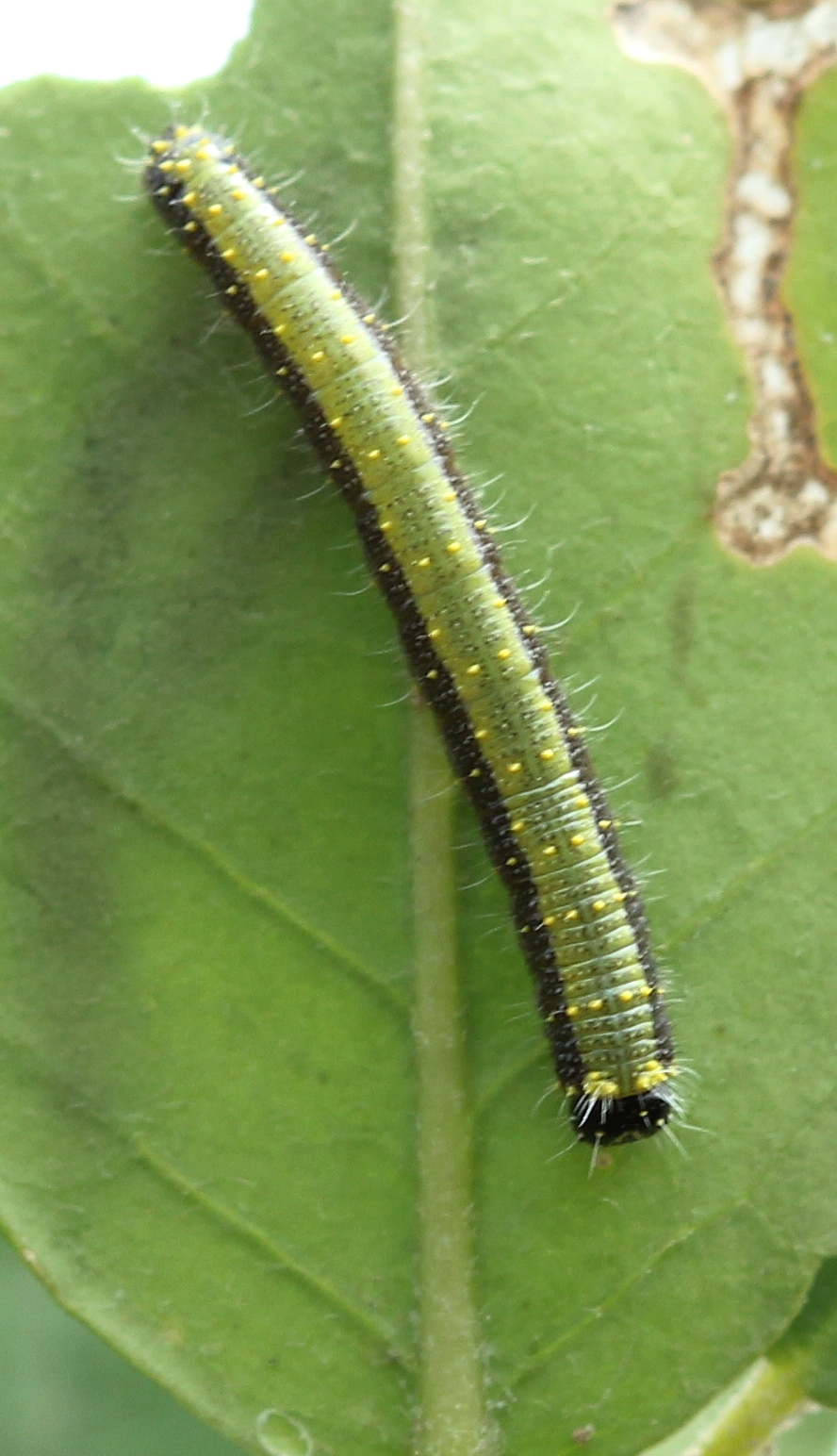
Final instar caterpillar

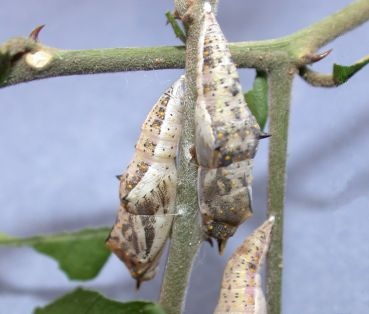
Pupae

== See also ==
- List of butterflies of India (Pieridae)
