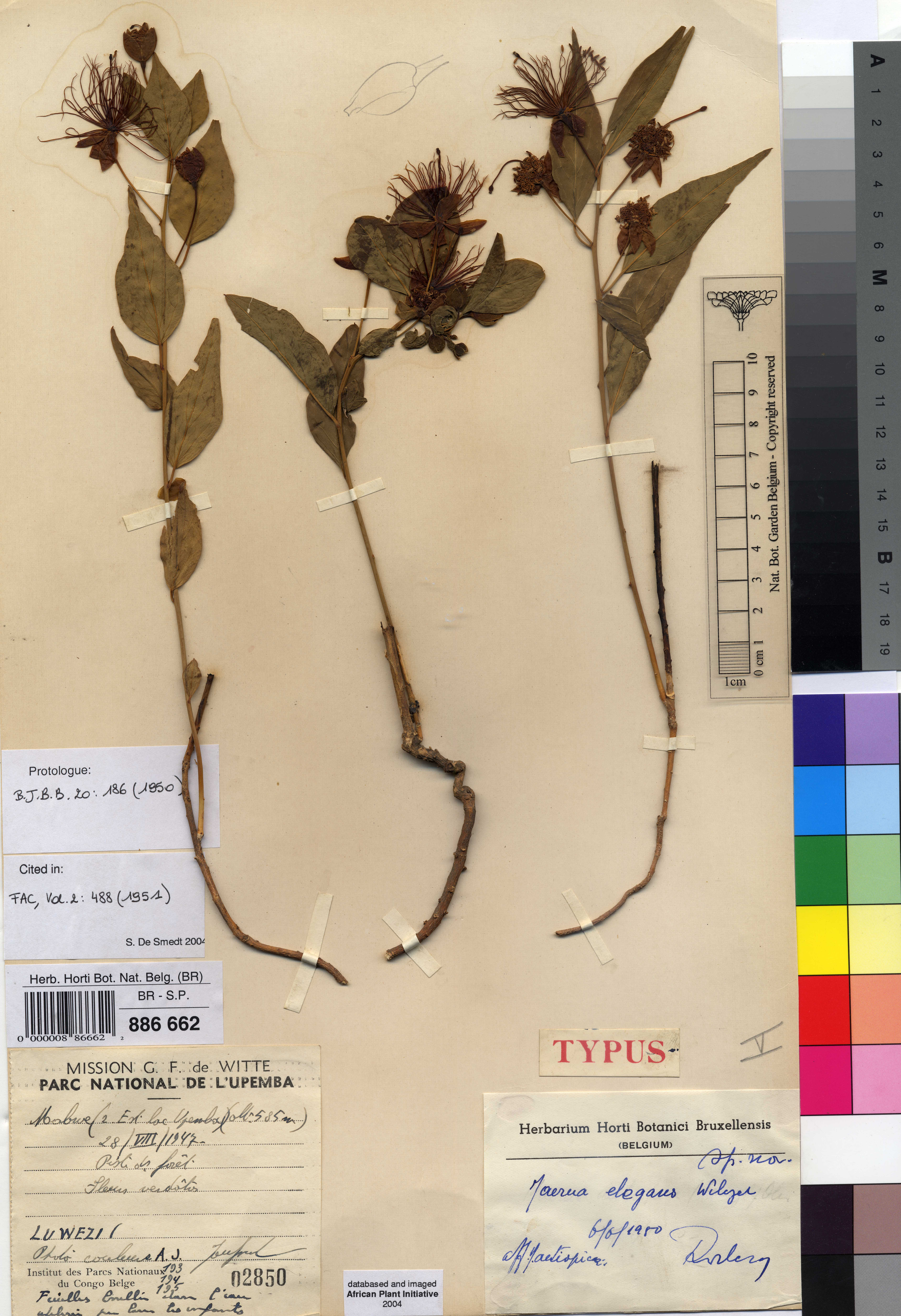

Conservation status
- Least Concern (IUCN 3.1)

Scientific classification
- Kingdom: Plantae
- Clade: Tracheophytes
- Clade: Angiosperms
- Clade: Eudicots
- Clade: Rosids
- Order: Brassicales
- Family: Capparaceae
- Genus: Maerua
- Species: M. elegans

Binomial name
- Maerua elegans R. Wilczek

= Maerua elegans =

Species of flowering plant

Maerua elegans is a plant species in the family Capparaceae, endemic to the Democratic Republic of the Congo. It is threatened by habitat loss.
