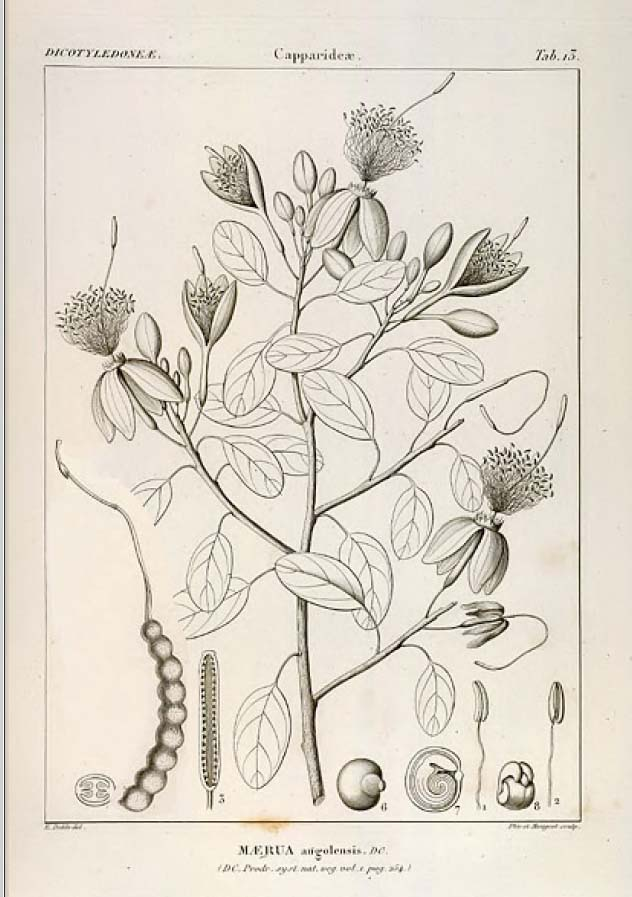

Scientific classification
- Kingdom: Plantae
- Clade: Tracheophytes
- Clade: Angiosperms
- Clade: Eudicots
- Clade: Rosids
- Order: Brassicales
- Family: Capparaceae
- Genus: Maerua
- Species: M. angolensis

Binomial name
- Maerua angolensis DC. (1824)

Subspecies and varieties
- Maerua angolensis var. africana Kers; Maerua angolensis subsp. angolensis; Maerua angolensis var. heterophylla Welw. ex Oliv.; Maerua angolensis subsp. socotrana (Schweinf. ex Balf.f.) Kers

Synonyms
- Maerua bukobensis Gilg & Gilg-Ben. (1915); Maerua currorii Hook. f.; Maerua emarginata Schinz; Maerua lucida Hochst. ex A. Rich. (1847); Maerua retusa Hochst. ex A. Rich. (1847); Maerua senegalensis R. Br. ex A. Rich. (1830); Maerua tomentosa Pax (1891); Maerua floribunda Fenzl (1844) non Sim

= Maerua angolensis =

Species of tree

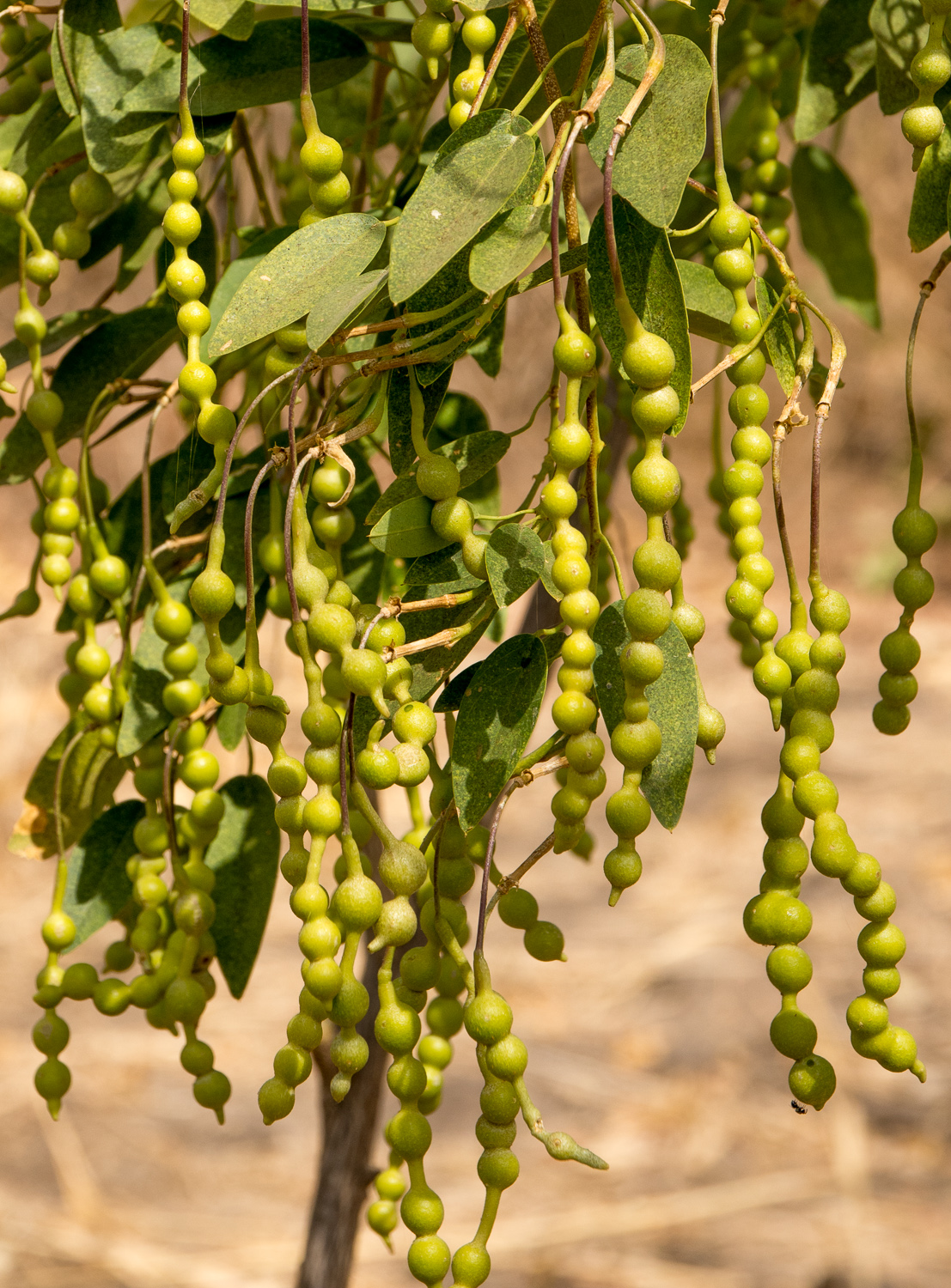
Maerua angolensis fruit in Senegal

Maerua angolensis is a 10m tall, occasionally deciduous tree of the Capparaceae or caper family, often growing on termitaria and in thickets fringing seasonal watercourses, up to 1800m. Though never common, it is widespread in tropical Africa and arid regions, being absent from high-rainfall regions.

== Description ==
The tree has a rounded crown and smooth grey bark flaking to reveal yellowish-orange patches. As with most species in the family the twigs and branches display prominent lenticels. Leaves are soft and drooping, with petioles equal to the leaves in length, and visibly thicker or inspissate at their extremities. Leaves are alternate and broadly elliptic to ovate, with rounded or notched apex and a terminal bristle (mucronate). Leaf surfaces are often noticeably scratched by their rubbing against the bristles of surrounding leaves.

The species is variable as regards pubescence, ranging from entirely glabrous to pubescent on stems and leaves. The fragrant, pincushion-like flowers are without petals and are produced in abundance at the beginning of the rainy season. Filaments are numerous (c.50) and long, initially pale yellow then turning darker with age. The 4 calyx segments recurve on opening, and the base is fringed with hairs. The distinctive torulose fruit is a silique and resembles a string of beads some 150mm in length. A slender, taller version of this species growing in the Socotra archipelago, Somalia, Ethiopia and Yemen has been named Maerua angolensis subsp. socotrana (Schweinf. ex Balf. f.) Kers. M. angolensis is similar to M. schinzii Pax. from Namibia, which has thicker, almost fleshy leaves and other relatively trivial differences. The wood of this species is whitish-yellow, hard, dense and fine-grained, with a tendency to separate into concentric shells along the annual rings.

== Distribution ==
It is found in Burkina Faso, Burundi, Cameroon, Chad, Eritrea, The Gambia, Ghana, Kenya, Mali, Mauritania, Niger, Nigeria, Rwanda, Senegal, Sudan, Tanzania, Togo, Uganda, extending southwards into Angola, Botswana, Caprivi Strip, Eswatini, Malawi, Mozambique, Namibia, South Africa, Zambia and Zimbabwe. The genus comprises some 57 species, mostly in tropical Africa, but also extending into the Middle East and tropical Asia.

== Subspecies and varieties ==
Four subspecies and varieties are accepted:

- Maerua angolensis var. africana Kers – eastern Ethiopia, Somalia, and northern Yemen
- Maerua angolensis subsp. angolensis – tropical and southern Africa from Senegal to Somalia and south to Angola and Kwazulu-Natal
- Maerua angolensis var. heterophylla Welw. ex Oliv. – Angola
- Maerua angolensis subsp. socotrana (Schweinf. ex Balf.f.) Kers – Socotra

== Uses ==
Despite their unpleasant, bitter taste, the leaves are used by African rural tribes during famine periods as a food supplement, and also used as a purgative. Powdered leaves are used as a fish poison and to treat anorexia and asthenia, while bark extracts and pulped leaves are used to promote the healing of wounds. Decoctions of the leaves are given to children suffering amoebic dysentery or jaundice, and to treat rheumatism, stomach-ache, epilepsy and diarrhoea, while decoctions of the bark are used to treat malaria and as an aphrodisiac. Game and livestock readily browse the foliage. This species, in common with other members of the family, is host to butterflies of the family Pieridae. Instar larvae may defoliate a tree completely, but leaves regrow readily.

Phytochemical analysis of the bark revealed glycosides, terpenes, tannins, flavonoids, saponins, carbohydrates, proteins, alkaloids and other constituents. Further studies suggested that the bark is non-toxic in anti-inflammatory doses, supporting ethnomedical use of the plant in managing inflammation.
