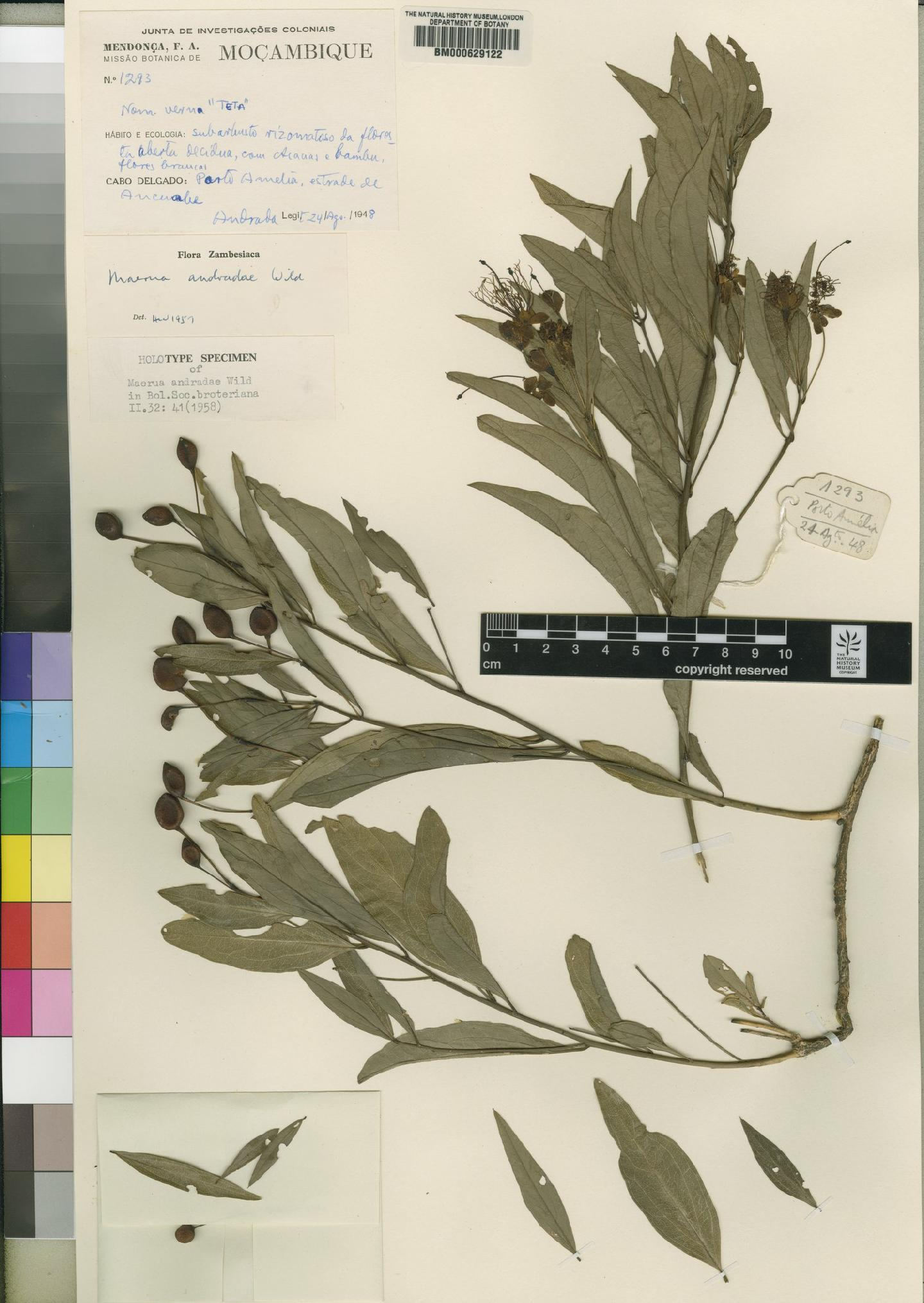

Conservation status
- Least Concern (IUCN 3.1)

Scientific classification
- Kingdom: Plantae
- Clade: Tracheophytes
- Clade: Angiosperms
- Clade: Eudicots
- Clade: Rosids
- Order: Brassicales
- Family: Capparaceae
- Genus: Maerua
- Species: M. andradae

Binomial name
- Maerua andradae Wild

= Maerua andradae =

Species of flowering plant

Maerua andradae is a species of plant in the Capparaceae family. It is endemic to Mozambique.
