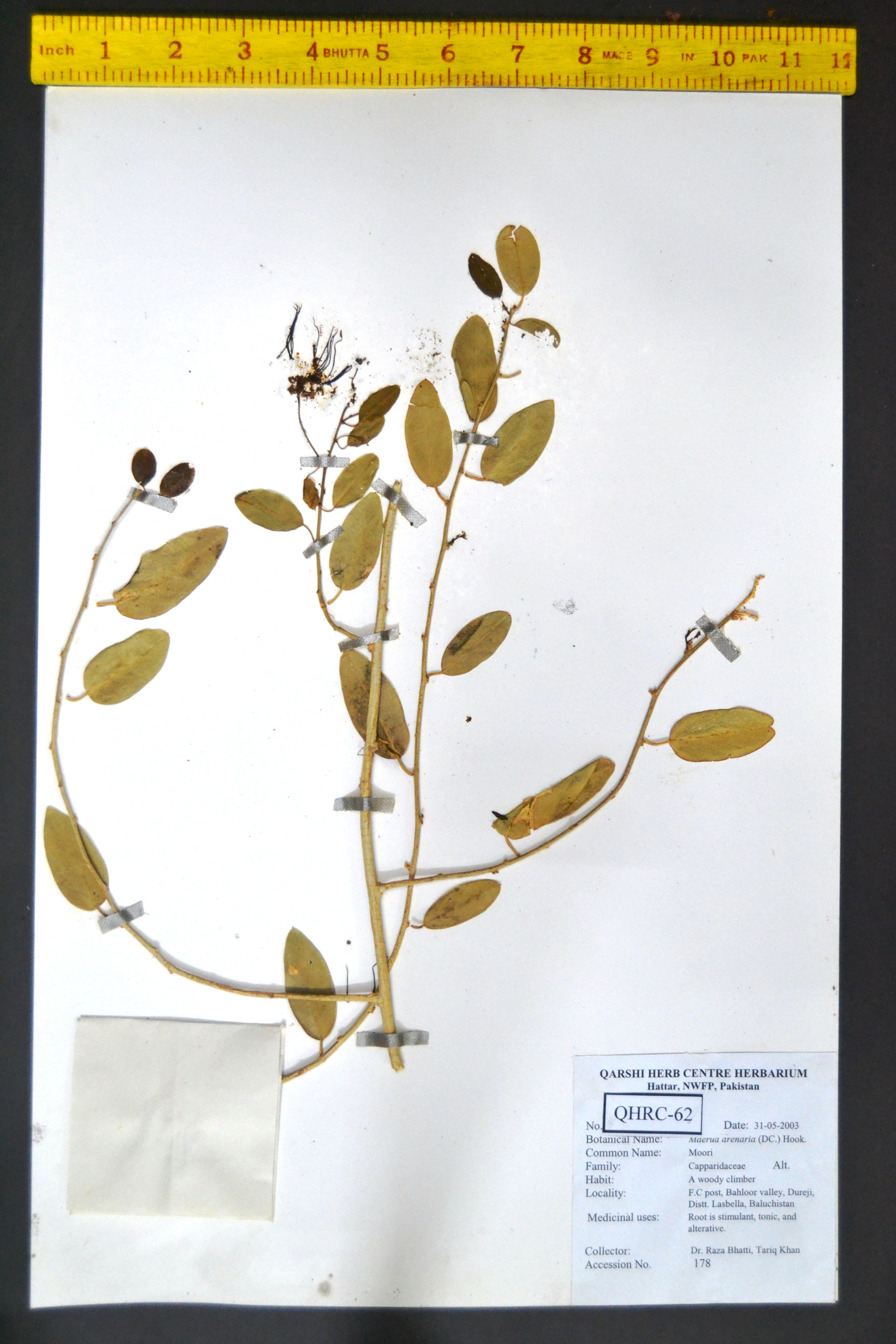

Scientific classification
- Kingdom: Plantae
- Clade: Embryophytes
- Clade: Tracheophytes
- Clade: Spermatophytes
- Clade: Angiosperms
- Clade: Eudicots
- Clade: Rosids
- Order: Brassicales
- Family: Capparaceae
- Genus: Maerua
- Species: M. oblongifolia

Binomial name
- Maerua oblongifolia Forssk. (A.Rich.)

= Maerua oblongifolia =

Species of shrub

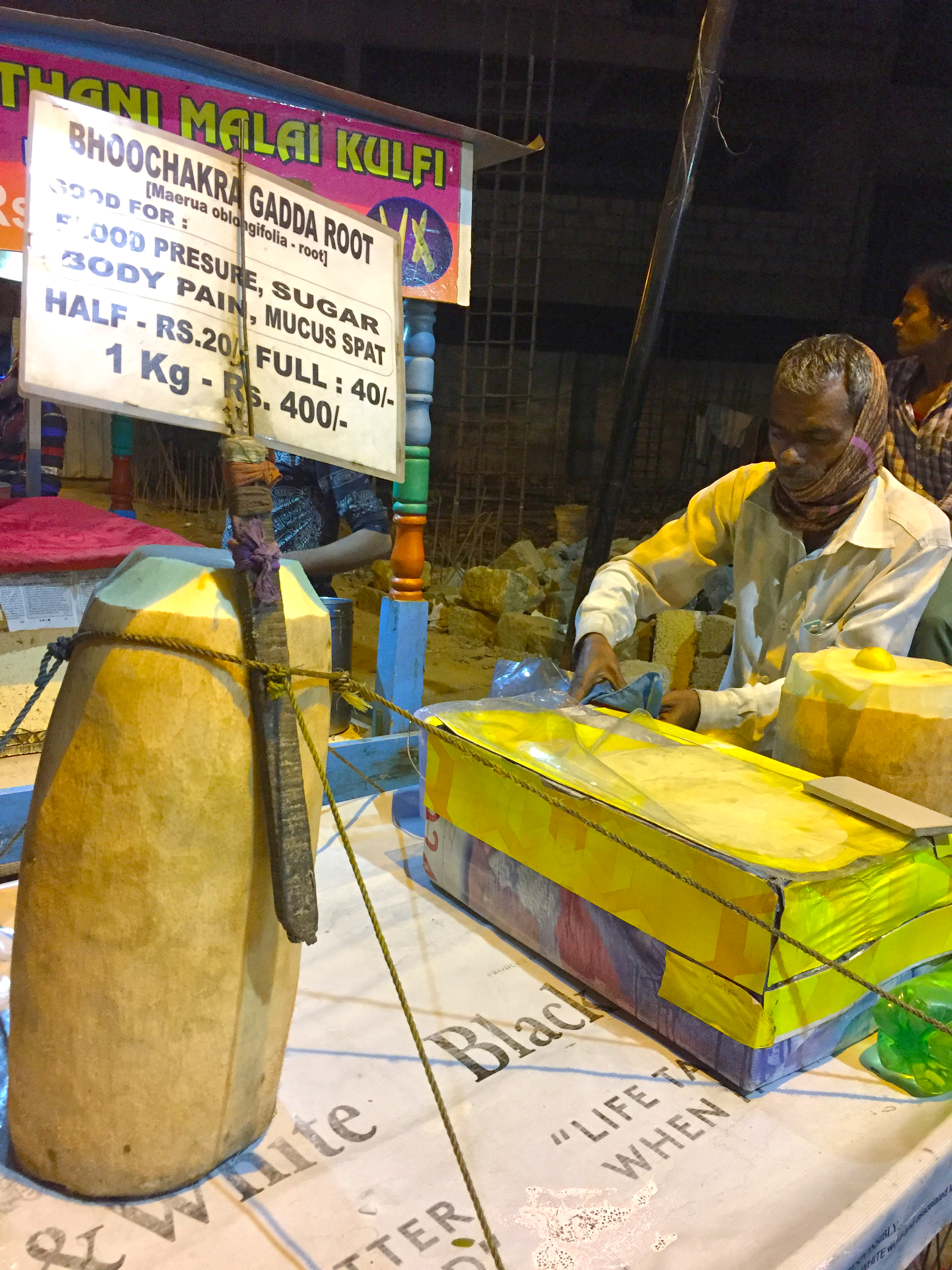
A Maerua oblongifolia being sold at the thindi beedi (food street), V.V. Puram, Bangalore

Maerua oblongifolia (syn. Maerua arenaria, Niebhuria arenaria) is a low woody bushy under-shrub sometimes scandent to 2–3 meters high, with a thick root stock and thick leaves, and strongly scented flowers, occurring in India, Pakistan, Africa and Saudi Arabia. In Telugu this plant is known as Bhoochakra gadda (In Telangana) and also as Bhoochakra dumpa (In Andhra). In kannada its called Bhoo Chakra Gedde ಭೂಚಕ್ರ ಗೆಡ್ಡೆ, In Tamil this plant is called Poomicchakkarai Kizhangu (பூமிச் சர்க்கரைக் கிழங்கு). This is a tuber that naturally grows in areas closer to fountains, especially in hills. Local Tribes and others collect the tubers, which are then sold in many Indian town and cities as a quick street food.

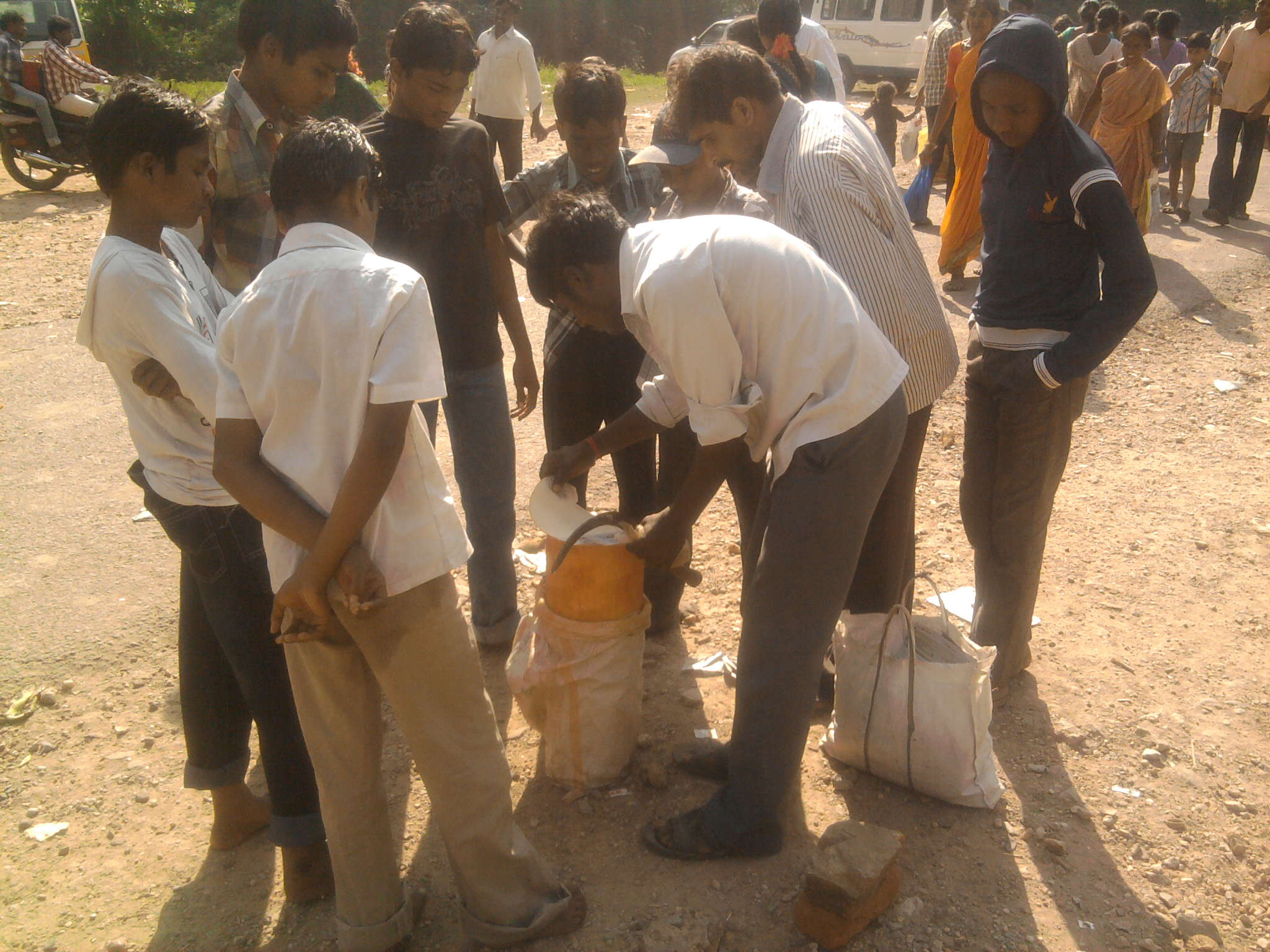
Selling Bhoochakra gadda root small round pieces

== Uses ==
The root of the plant resembles licorice in appearance and taste and said to possess alternative, tonic and medicinal properties. The root of this plant, which tastes like coconut pulp, is edible and is eaten with sugar. The tuber is medicinal, and is used in Indian traditional medicine such as Ayurveda medicine, and is also eaten raw to quench thirst. Traditionally, the fleshy roots of this plant are used as alternative tonic and stimulant. The plant is also used for treatment of snake bites and scorpion stings.

== Doubts ==
The root is brought to the shops in a very secretive manner, in that where it is either collected or obtained is kept secret. There are doubts amongst botanists as to whether the described plant is Maerua oblongifolia.
