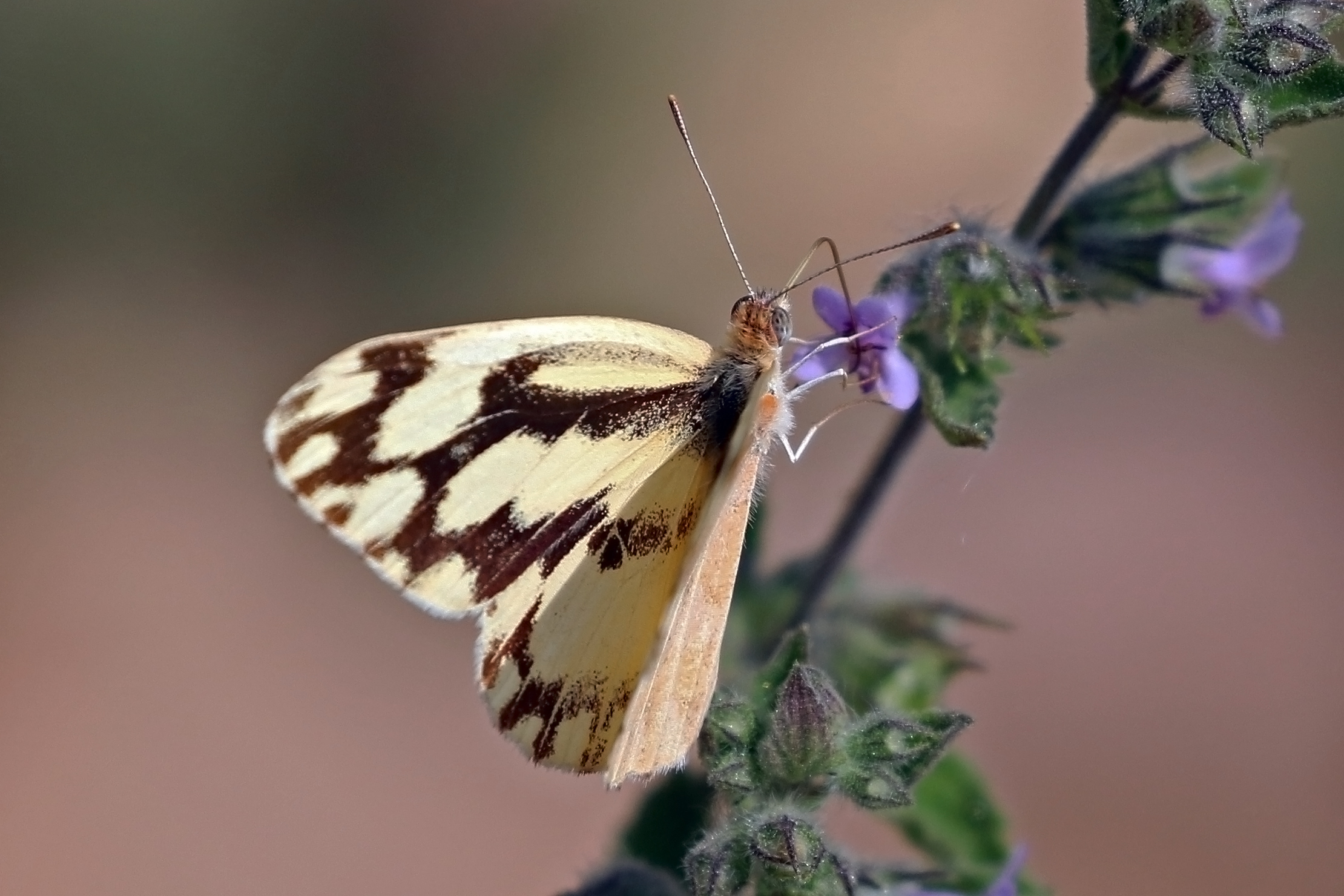

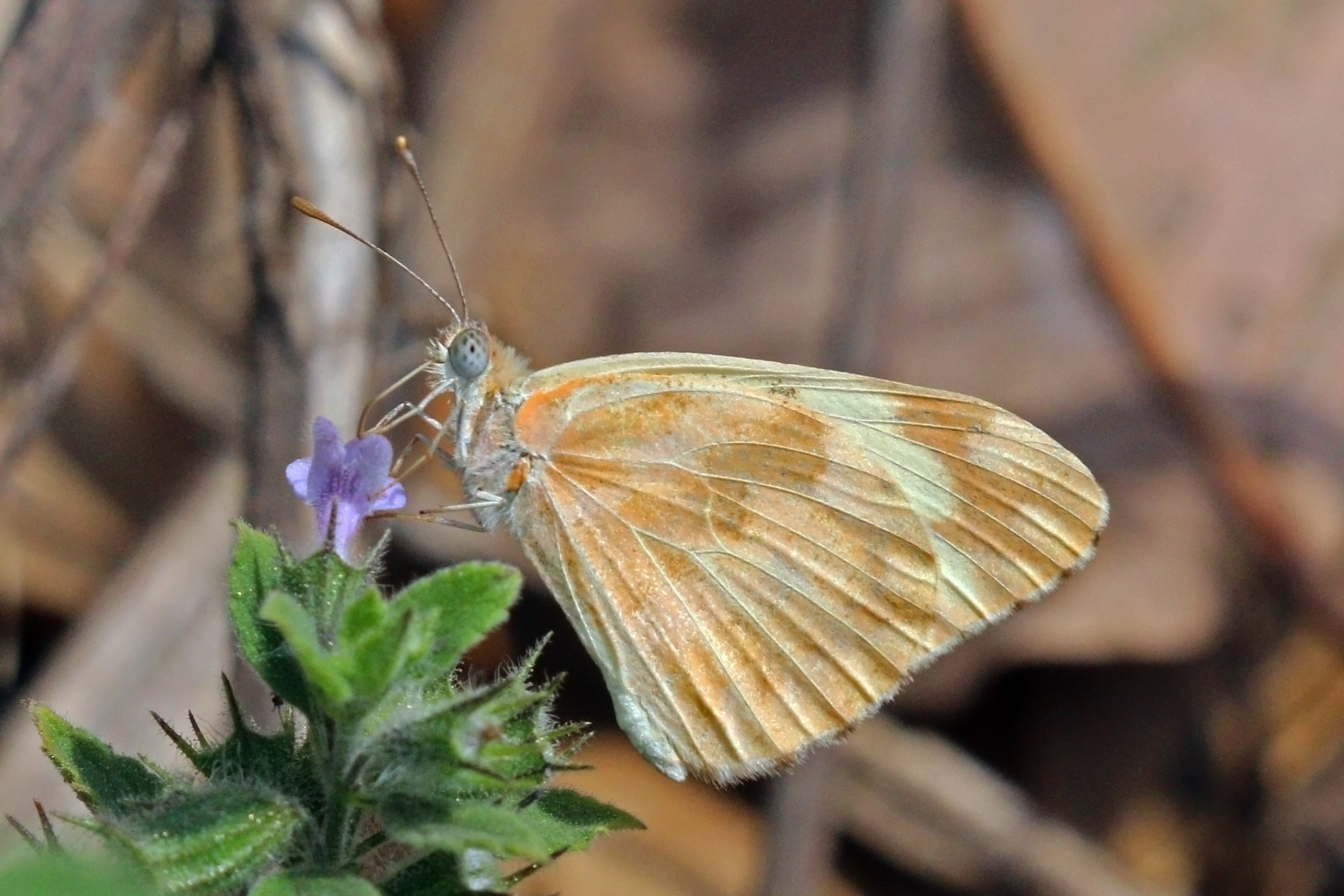
- Both male Pinacopteryx eriphia tritogenia, in Senegal

Scientific classification
- Kingdom: Animalia
- Phylum: Arthropoda
- Clade: Pancrustacea
- Class: Insecta
- Order: Lepidoptera
- Family: Pieridae
- Subfamily: Pierinae
- Tribe: Pierini
- Genus: Pinacopteryx; Wallengren, 1857
- Species: P. eriphia

Binomial name
- Pinacopteryx eriphia (Godart, [1819])

Synonyms
- Pieris eriphia Godart, [1819]; Herpaenia eriphia var. nyassae Lanz, 1896; Herpaenia eriphia var. mabillei Aurivillius, [1899]; Pieris [Herpaenia] callianira Mabille, 1899; Herpaenia melanarge Butler, 1886; Herpaenia iterata Butler, 1888; Pontia tritogenia Klug, 1829; Herpaenia lacteipennis Butler, 1876; Herpaenia eriphia var. straminea Aurivillius, 1904; Pinacopteryx eriphia wittei Berger, 1940

= Pinacopteryx =

Monotypic butterfly genus in family Pieridae

Pinacopteryx is a monotypic genus of pierid butterflies found in Africa containing Pinacopteryx eriphia, the zebra white.

The wingspan is 40–55 mm in males and 42–47 mm in females. Its flight period is year-round.

Larvae feed on Maerua cafra, Boscia species, Capparis oleoides, and Maerua triphylla.

== Subspecies ==
- Pinacopteryx eriphia eriphia (Godart, [1819]) (South Africa, Zimbabwe, Botswana, Mozambique, Malawi, southern Tanzania)
- Pinacopteryx eriphia mabillei (Aurivillius, [1898]) (Madagascar)
- Pinacopteryx eriphia melanarge (Butler, 1886) (southern Sudan, southern Ethiopia, central Ethiopia, Somalia, Kenya, northern Uganda, northern Tanzania)
- Pinacopteryx eriphia tritogenia (Klug, 1829) (Mauritania to Senegal, Upper Volta, Niger, Chad, Sudan, northern Ethiopia, Arabia)
- Pinacopteryx eriphia wittei Berger, 1940 (western Uganda, north-eastern DRC)

Torben Larsen developed a species numbering system for his 2005 publication Butterflies of West Africa. The subspecies tritogenia is #44. The 'Larsen' numbers have since been used with permission in A Sharp Eye on Butterflies of Ghana.
