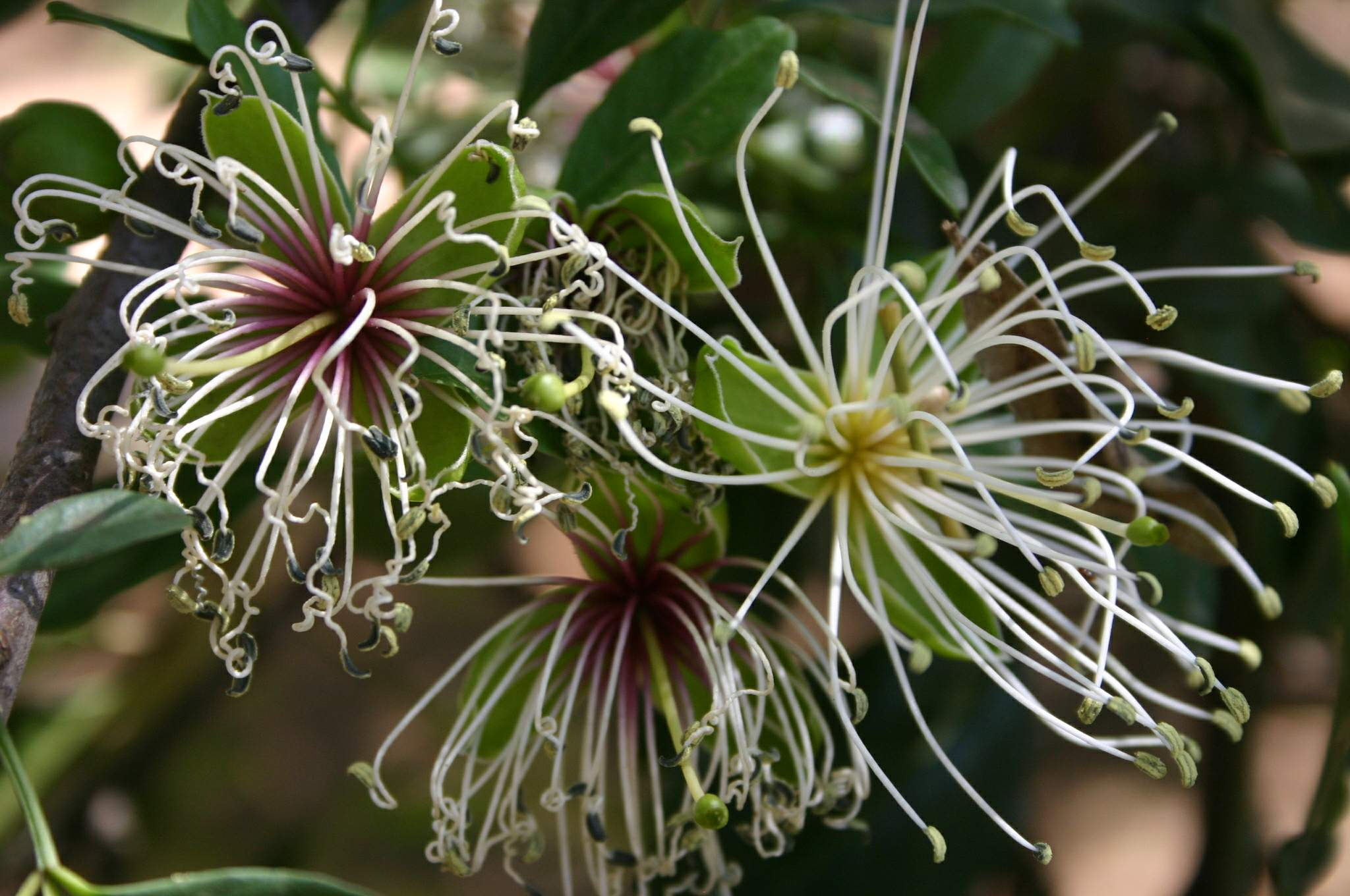

Scientific classification
- Kingdom: Plantae
- Clade: Tracheophytes
- Clade: Angiosperms
- Clade: Eudicots
- Clade: Rosids
- Order: Brassicales
- Family: Capparaceae
- Genus: Maerua; Forssk. (1775)

Species
- 70; see text

Synonyms
- Courbonia Brongn. (1860); Niebuhria DC. (1824); Physanthemum Klotzsch (1861); Streblocarpus Arn. (1834); Wiegmannia Hochst. & Steud. (1841)

= Maerua =

Genus of flowering plants

Maerua is a genus of flowering plants in the family Capparaceae. It includes 70 species of shrubs and small trees with its centre of diversity in Africa, though some species extend their range as far north as the Levant, and as far east as the Indian subcontinent and mainland Southeast Asia.

70 species are accepted:

- Maerua acuminata Oliver
- Maerua aethiopica (Fenzl) Oliv.
- Maerua andradae Wild
- Maerua angolensis DC.
- Maerua apetala (B.Heyne ex Roth) M.Jacobs
- Maerua arenaria Hook.f. & Thomson
- Maerua baillonii Hadj-Moust.
- Maerua boranensis Chiov.
- Maerua brevipetiolata Killick
- Maerua brunnescens Wild
- Maerua bussei (Gilg & Gilg-Ben.) R.Wilczek
- Maerua buxifolia (Welw. ex Oliv.) Gilg & Gilg-Ben.
- Maerua cafra (DC.) Pax
- Maerua calantha Gilg
- Maerua candida Gilg
- Maerua crassifolia Forssk.
- Maerua cylindrocarpa Hadj-Moust.
- Maerua decumbens (Brongn.) DeWolf
- Maerua denhardtiorum Gilg
- Maerua descampsii De Wild.
- Maerua dewaillyi Aubrév. & Pellegr.
- Maerua duchesnei (De Wild.) F.White
- Maerua edulis (Gilg & Gilg-Ben.) DeWolf
- Maerua elegans R.Wilczek
- Maerua eminii Pax
- Maerua endlichii Gilg & Gilg-Ben.
- Maerua erlangeriana Gilg & Gilg-Ben.
- Maerua filiformis Drake
- Maerua friesii Gilg & Gilg-Ben.
- Maerua gilgiana De Wild.
- Maerua gilgii Schinz
- Maerua gillettii Kers
- Maerua glauca Chiov.
- Maerua grantii Oliv.
- Maerua holstii Pax
- Maerua homblei De Wild.
- Maerua humbertii Hadj-Moust.
- Maerua intricata Kers
- Maerua juncea Pax
- Maerua kaessneri Gilg & Gilg-Ben.
- Maerua kaokoensis Swanepoel
- Maerua kirkii (Oliv.) F.White
- Maerua koratensis Srisanga & Watthana
- Maerua macrantha Gilg
- Maerua mendesii J.A.Abreu, E.S.Martins & Catarino
- Maerua mungaii Beentje
- Maerua nana R.A.Graham ex Polhill
- Maerua nervosa (Hochst.) Oliv.
- Maerua nuda Scott Elliot
- Maerua oblongifolia (Forssk.) A.Rich.
- Maerua paniculata Wild
- Maerua parvifolia Pax
- Maerua pintobastoae J.A.Abreu, E.S.Martins & Catarino
- Maerua polyandra R.A.Graham
- Maerua prittwitzii Gilg & Gilg-Ben.
- Maerua pseudopetalosa (Gilg & Gilg-Ben.) DeWolf
- Maerua puccionii Chiov.
- Maerua purpurascens Thulin
- Maerua racemulosa Gilg & Gilg-Ben.
- Maerua robynsii R.Wilczek
- Maerua rosmarinoides (Sond.) Hochst. ex Pax
- Maerua salicifolia Wild
- Maerua scandens (Klotzsch) Gilg
- Maerua schinzii Pax
- Maerua schliebenii Gilg-Ben.
- Maerua sessiliflora Gilg
- Maerua siamensis (Kurz) Pax
- Maerua somalensis Pax
- Maerua subcordata (Gilg) DeWolf
- Maerua triphylla A.Rich.
