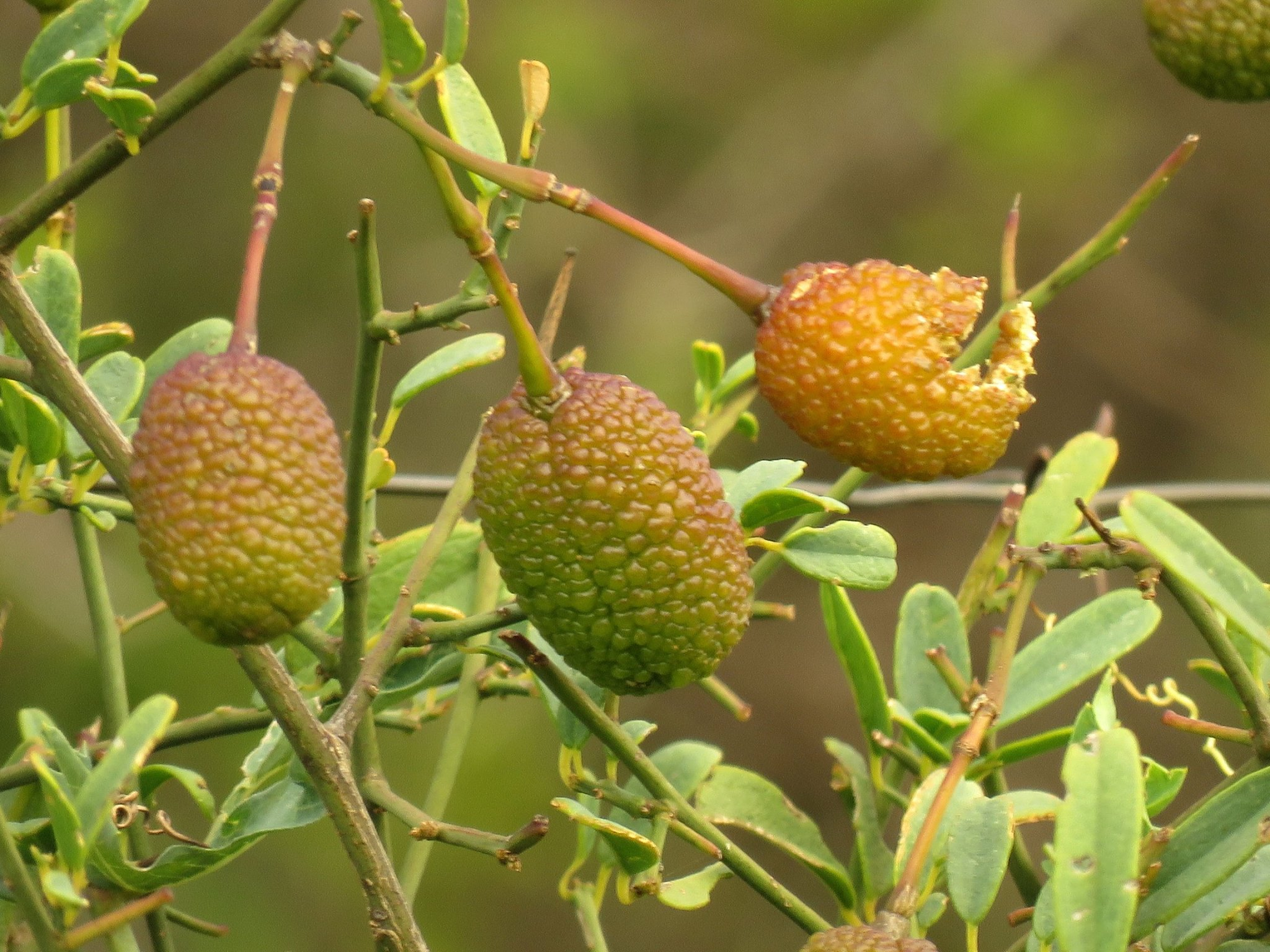

Scientific classification
- Kingdom: Plantae
- Clade: Tracheophytes
- Clade: Angiosperms
- Clade: Eudicots
- Clade: Rosids
- Order: Brassicales
- Family: Capparaceae
- Genus: Maerua
- Species: M. juncea

Binomial name
- Maerua juncea Pax

= Maerua juncea =

Rough-skinned bush cherry

Species of flowering plant

Maerua juncea, commonly known as the rough-skinned bush cherry, is a plant species in the Capparaceae family. It is native to the Afrotropics.

== Subspecies ==
The following subspecies are accepted:

- M. j. subsp. crustata Wild
- M. j. subsp. juncea
