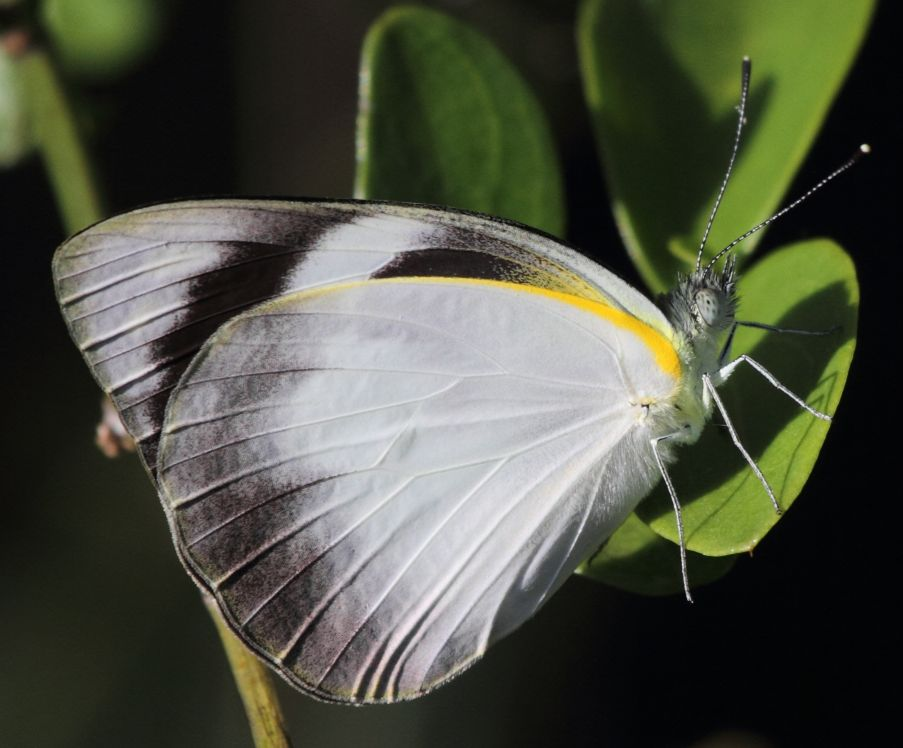
- A. e. contracta

Scientific classification
- Kingdom: Animalia
- Phylum: Arthropoda
- Clade: Pancrustacea
- Class: Insecta
- Order: Lepidoptera
- Family: Pieridae
- Genus: Appias
- Species: A. epaphia

Binomial name
- Appias epaphia (Cramer, [1779])

Synonyms
- Papilio epaphia Cramer, [1779]; Appias (Glutophrissa) epaphia; Pieris orbona Boisduval, 1833; Glutophrissa contracta Butler, 1888; Papilio saba Fabricius, 1781; Papilio hypatia Drury, 1782; Pieris higinia Godart, 1819; Pieris matuta Doubleday, 1847; Appias epaphia ab. infralimbalis Strand, 1912; Appias epaphia var. limbophora Strand, 1913; Appias epaphia ab. simplicior Strand, 1913; Appias sabina var. epaphiopsis Gaede, 1916; Appias epaphia ab. decolorata Hulstaert, 1924; Appias epaphia ab. confluens Hulstaert, 1924; Appias epaphia f. arctimargo Hulstaert, 1924; Appias epaphia epaphia f. dido Talbot, 1943; Appias epaphia epaphia ab. lagai Dufrane, 1947; Appias epaphia epaphia ab. deficiens Dufrane, 1947; Pieris mahoboides Holland, 1896; Appias epaphia eurynome Stoneham, 1957; Appias epaphia f. ione Stoneham, 1957; Pieris malatha Boisduval, 1833; Pieris saba var. albida Mabille, 1887; Pieris saba var. flava Mabille, 1887; Appias epaphia f. aglaia Stoneham, 1957

= Appias epaphia =

Species of butterfly

Appias epaphia, the diverse white or African albatross, is a butterfly of the family Pieridae. It is found in Africa, south of the Sahara. The habitat consists of forests and heavy woodland.

The wingspan is 40–50 millimetres (1.6–2.0 in). Adults are on wing year-round, but mainly from March to May in southern Africa.

The larvae feed on Capparis species (including Capparis sepiaria), Maerua racemulosa, and Boscia albitrunca.

== Subspecies ==
- A. e. aequatorialis Mendes & Bivar de Sousa, 2006 (São Tomé Island)
- A. e. angolensis Mendes & Bivar de Sousa, 2006 (Angola)
- A. e. epaphia (Senegal, Gambia, Guinea, Sierra Leone, Liberia, Ivory Coast, Burkina Faso, Ghana, Togo, Benin, Nigeria, Niger, Cameroon, Equatorial Guinea, Gabon, Congo, Central African Republic, Angola, Democratic Republic of the Congo, western Uganda (Bwamba Forest), western Kenya)
- A. e. contracta (Butler, 1888) (South Sudan, Ethiopia, eastern Kenya, Tanzania, Zambia, Mozambique, Zimbabwe, north-eastern Botswana, South Africa (Limpopo Province, Mpumalanga, KwaZulu-Natal, Eastern Cape Province), Eswatini, Comoro Islands)
- A. e. orbona (Boisduval, 1833) (Madagascar)
- A. e. piresi Mendes & Bivar de Sousa, 2006 (Príncipe Island)

Torben Larsen developed a species numbering system for his 2005 publication Butterflies of West Africa. The nominate subspecies is #87. The 'Larsen' numbers have since been used with permission in A Sharp Eye on Butterflies of Ghana.
