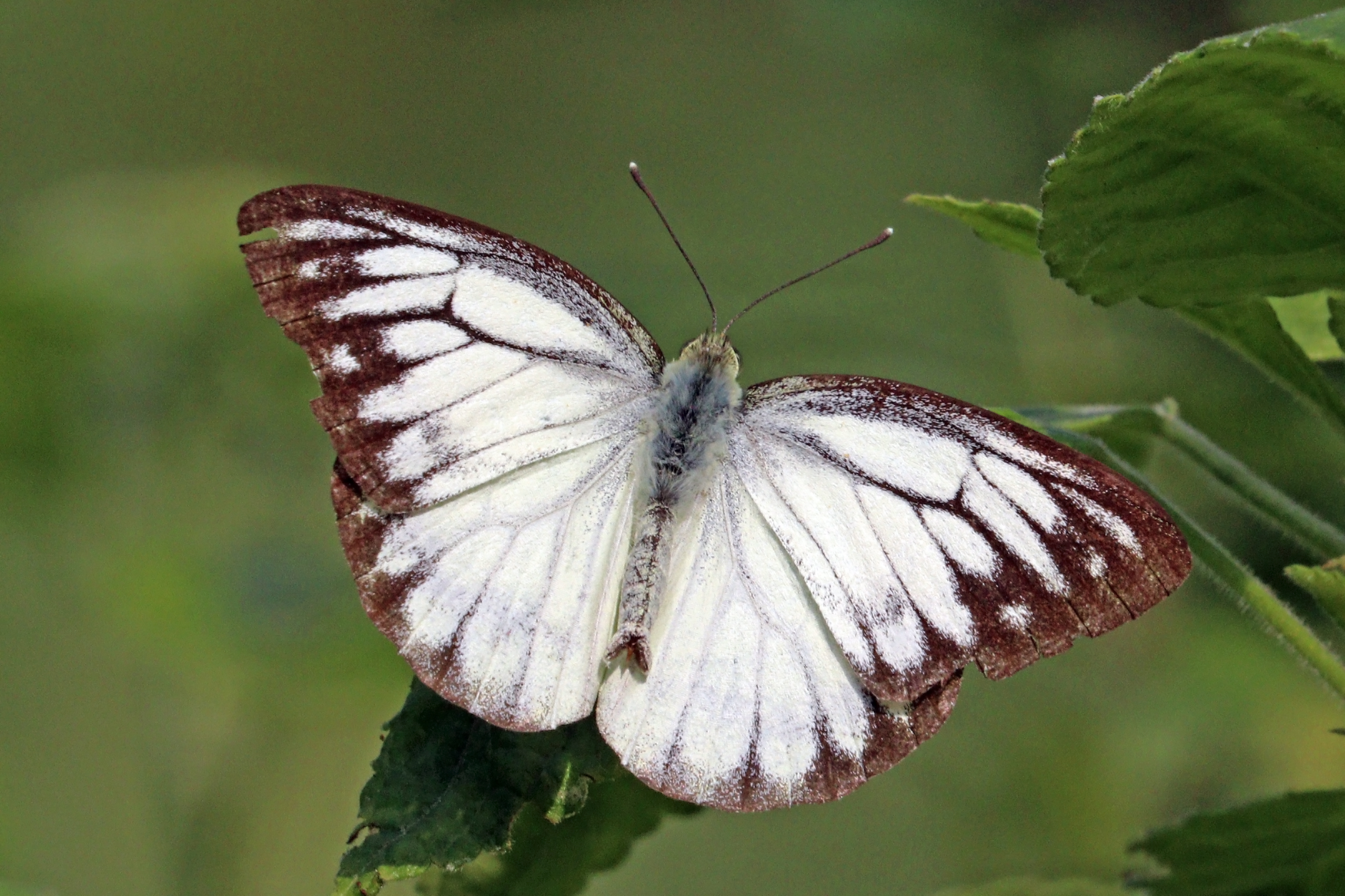
- Male, dry-season form
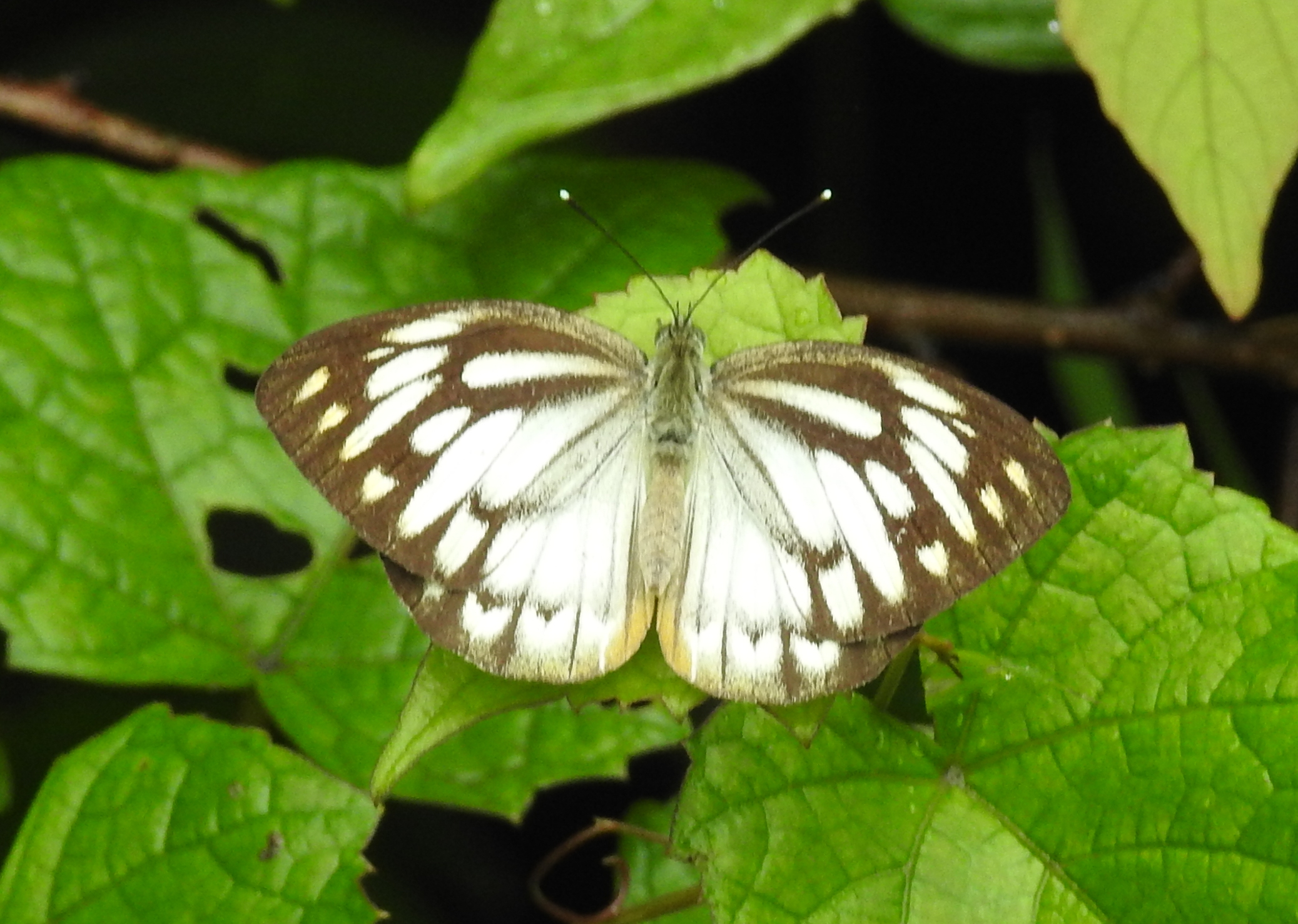
- Female

Scientific classification
- Kingdom: Animalia
- Phylum: Arthropoda
- Clade: Pancrustacea
- Class: Insecta
- Order: Lepidoptera
- Family: Pieridae
- Genus: Cepora
- Species: C. nerissa

Binomial name
- Cepora nerissa (Fabricius, 1775)

Subspecies
- See text

Synonyms
- Papilio nerissa Fabricius, 1775; Huphina nerissa; Papilio amasene Cramer, [1775]; Papilio coronis Cramer, [1775]; Huphina praetermissa Watkins, 1927; Huphina f. tairai Umeno, 1935; Appias dapha Moore, [1879]; Huphina vaso Doherty, 1891

= Cepora nerissa =

Common gull

Species of butterfly

Cepora nerissa, the common gull, is a small to medium-sized butterfly of the family Pieridae, that is, the yellows and whites, which is native to Sri Lanka, India, China, southeast Asia, and Indonesia.

== Description ==
=== Wet-season brood ===
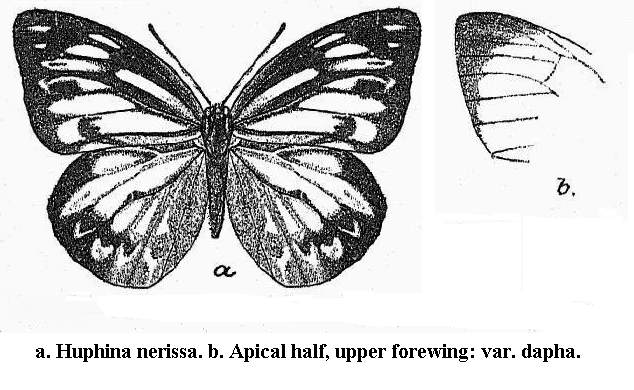
Female - woodcut from Charles Thomas Bingham's The Fauna of British India, Including Ceylon and Burma

Male upperside: white, a greyish-blue shade at base of the wings and along the veins, due to the dark markings on the underside that show through. Forewing: veins black; apex and termen black, the inner margin of that colour extended in an irregular curve from middle of costa to base of terminal third of vein 4, thence continued obliquely outwards to the tornal angle; interspaces 6 and 9 with short narrow greyish-white streaks of the ground colour that stretch into the black apical area but do not reach the margin; a short black subterminal bar between veins 3 and 4 and another, less clearly defined, between veins 1 and 2. Hindwing: veins 4 to 7 with outwardly dilated broad black edgings that coalesce sometimes and form an anterior, irregular, black, terminal margin to the wing. Underside, forewing: white, the veins broadly margined on both sides by dusky black; costal margin broadly and apex suffused with yellow; subterminal black bars between veins 1 and 2, and 3, and 4 as on the upperside but less clearly defined. Hindwing entirely suffused with yellow, the veins diffusely bordered with black; a more or less incomplete, subterminal series of dusky spots in interspaces 1 to 6; more often than not the spot in 5 entirely absent; a conspicuous chrome-yellow spot on the precostal area. Antennae black, obscurely speckled with white; head and thorax bluish grey; abdomen dusky black; beneath: the palpi and abdomen white, the thorax yellow.

Female similar to the male but very much darker. Upperside: veins more broadly bordered with black; in many specimens only the following portions of the white ground colour are apparent. Forewing: a broad streak in cell and beyond it a discal series of streaks in interspaces 1 to 6, 9, and 10; the streaks in interspaces 1 and 3 very broadly interrupted by the transverse black bars; that in 6 more or less obsolescent. Hindwing: a broad streak in cell, a discal series of streaks in interspaces 2 to 7, and a posterior more or less obsolescent subterminal series of greyish-white double spots. Underside similar to that of the male only the veins much more broadly margined with diffuse black scaling. Antennae, head, thorax and abdomen as in the male.

=== Dry-season brood ===
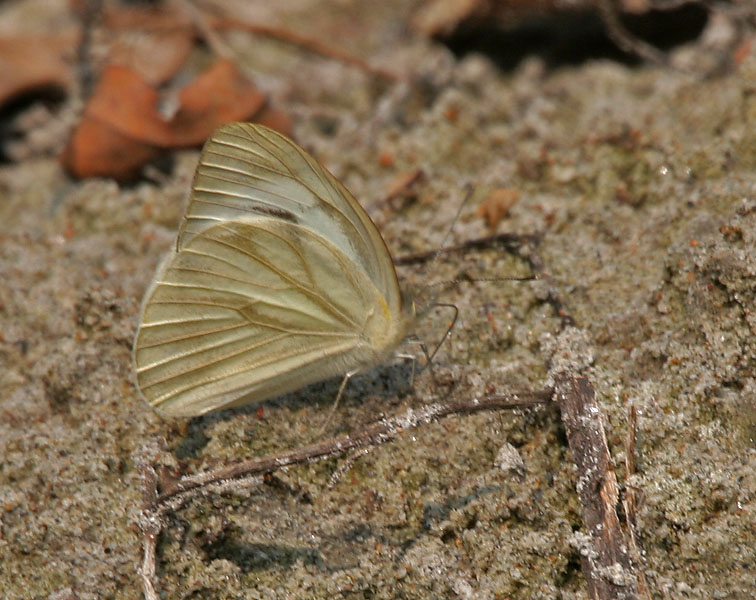
Dry-season form at Jayanti in Buxa Tiger Reserve in Jalpaiguri district of West Bengal, India

These differ from the wet-season brood as follows: male upperside, forewing: the apical and terminal black areas much restricted; veins concolorous; black subterminal bare less clearly defined; the lower one often obsolete. Hindwing: the black markings on the termen represented by short triangular irrorations (speckles) of black scales at the apices chiefly of the anterior veins. Underside: as in the wet-season specimens, but the yellow much paler and somewhat ochraceous in tint.

Female differs less from the wet-season female, but the black markings on both the upper and underside are narrower and less pronounced, and on the latter the yellow suffusion is paler and ochraceous in tint.

== Distribution ==
The species lives in the north-western Himalayas up to 4,000 feet (1,200 m); Nepal; Sikkim; Bhutan; Bengal: central, western, and southern India; Ceylon.

== Larva ==
"Cylindrical, tapering at the anal end; finely white-dotted, with a lower lateral white line. Feeds on Capparis." (Thwaites) Seems to prefer only Capparis zeylanica in Pune."

== Larval Host Plants ==
- Cadaba fruticosa
- Capparis baducca
- Capparis brevispina
- Capparis cleghornii
- Capparis decidua
- Capparis sepiaria
- Capparis zeylanica
- Crateva adansonii
- Maerua oblongifolia

== Pupa ==
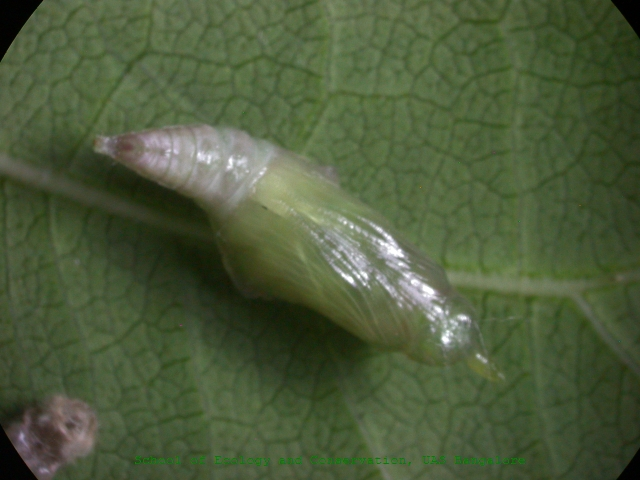
Pupa

"Greenish; thorax and basal abdominal segment acutely angled." (de Nicéville MS)

== Subspecies ==
Subspecies are:

- C. n. cibyra (Fruhstorfer, 1910) (Taiwan)
- C. n. coronis (Cramer, 1775) (China)
- C. n. corva (Wallace, 1867) (Java)
- C. n. dapha (Moore, 1879) (central Myanmar, eastern Myanmar to Thailand, northern Peninsular Malaya, Langkawi)
- C. n. dissimilis (Rotschild, 1892) (Bali)
- C. n. evagete (Cramer, 1775) (Sri Lanka, S.India)
- C. n. lichenosa (Moore, 1877) (Andamans)
- C. n. nerissa (Fabricius, 1775) (northern Vietnam, southern China)
- C. n. phryne (Fabricius, 1775) (northern India to western Burma)
- C. n. physkon (Fruhstorfer, 1910) (Lombok)
- C. n. sumatrana (Hagen, 1894) (Sumatra)
- C. n. vaso (Doherty, 1891) (Sumbawa)
- C. n. yunnanensis (Mell, 1951) (Yunnan)

Cepora lichenosa is treated as a full species by some authors.

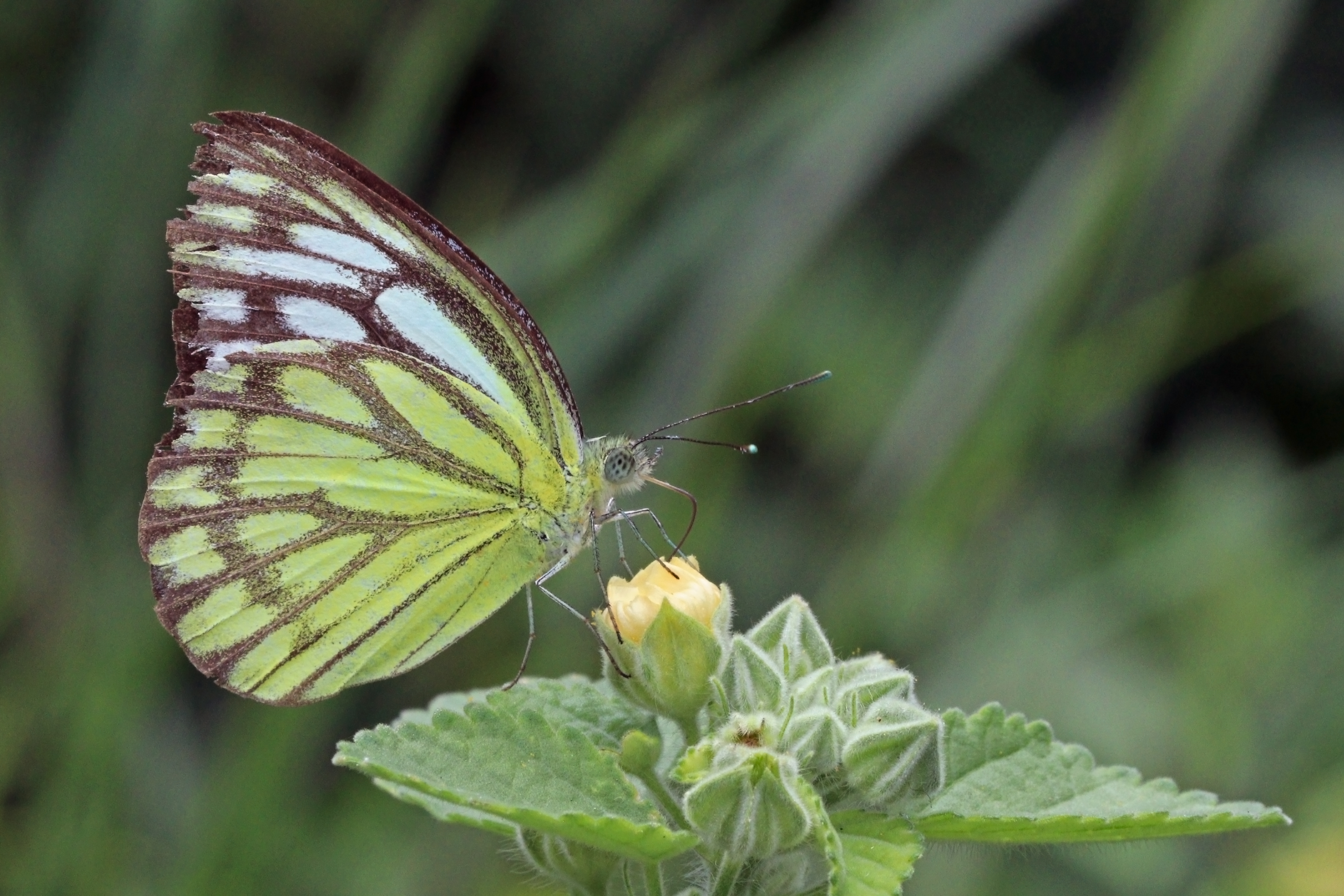
C. n. evagete female, Chinnar Wildlife Sanctuary, Kerala, India

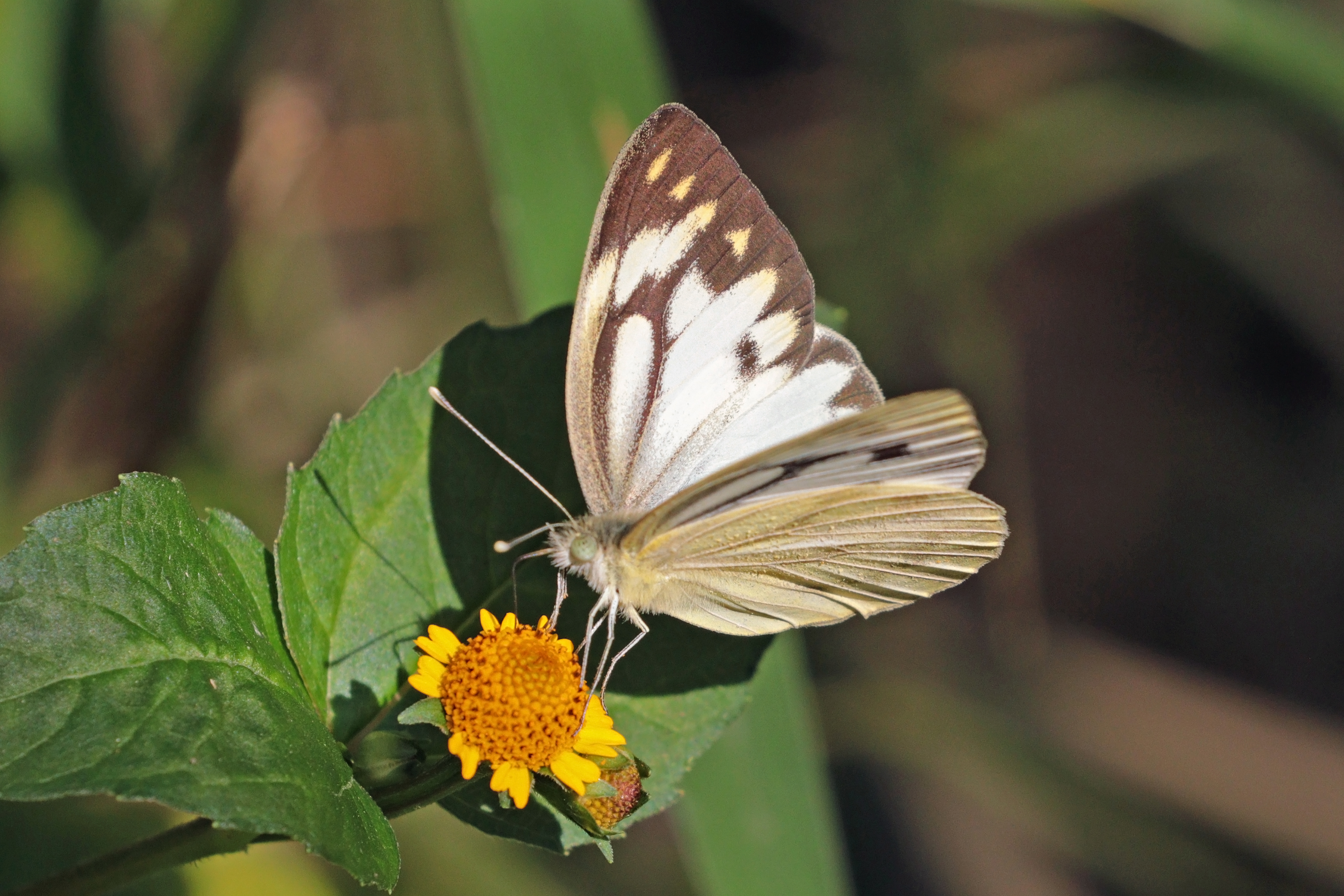
C. n. phryne male dry season form, Nepal

== See also ==
- List of butterflies of India (Pieridae)
