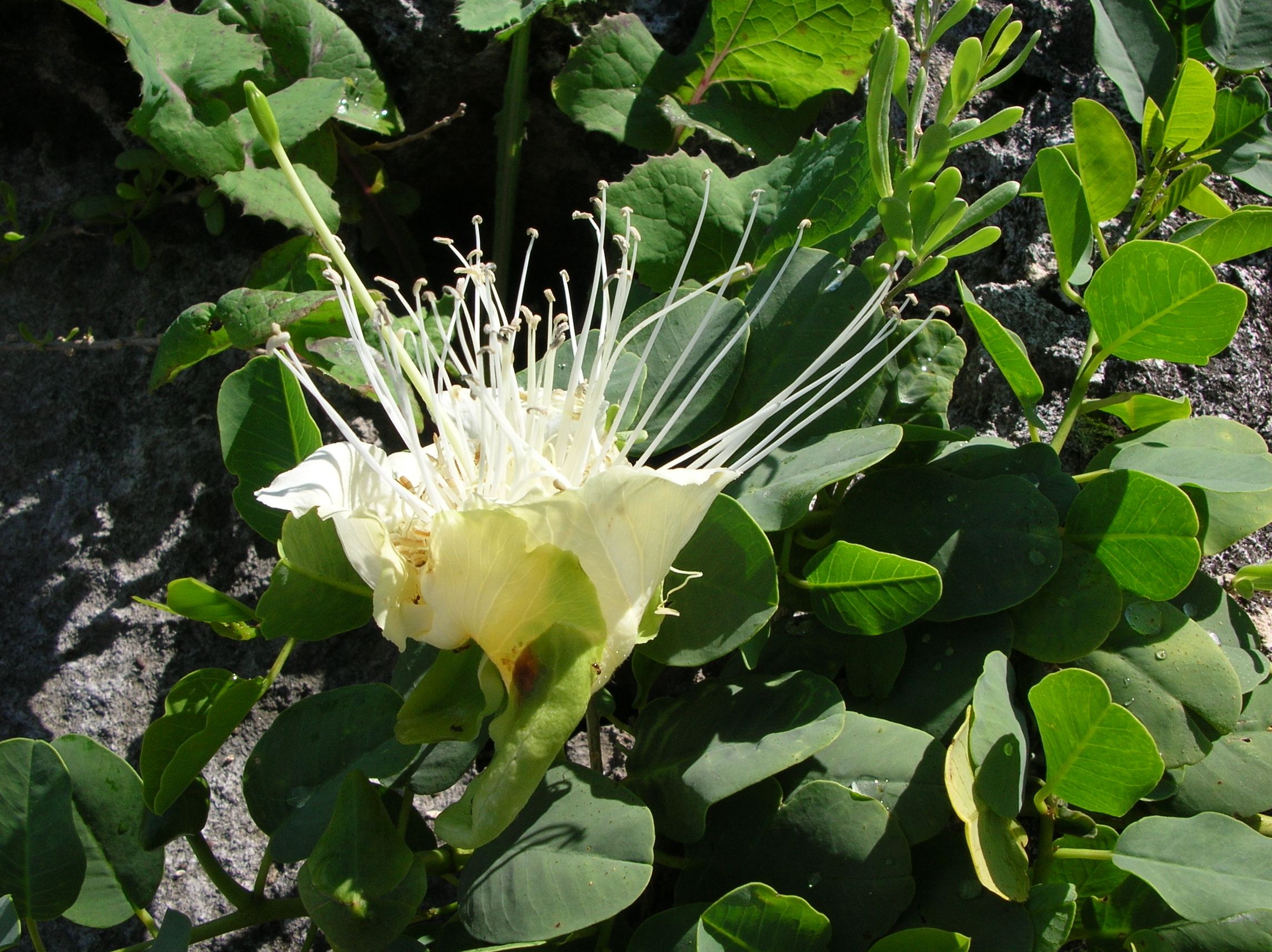
- Maiapilo (Capparis sandwichiana)

Scientific classification
- Kingdom: Plantae
- Clade: Tracheophytes
- Clade: Angiosperms
- Clade: Eudicots
- Clade: Rosids
- Order: Brassicales
- Family: Capparaceae
- Tribe: Cappareae
- Genus: Capparis; L.

Species
- 146, see text

Synonyms
- Anisosticte Bartl.; Apophyllum F.Muell.; Busbeckea Endl.; Calyptranthus Thouars; Destrugesia Gaudich.; Destruguezia Benth. & Hook.f., orth. var.; Dhofaria A.G.Mill.; Hombak Adans.; Marsesina Raf.; Oligloron Raf.; Olofuton Raf.; Petersia Klotzsch; Sodada Forssk.

= Capparis =

Genus of flowering plants

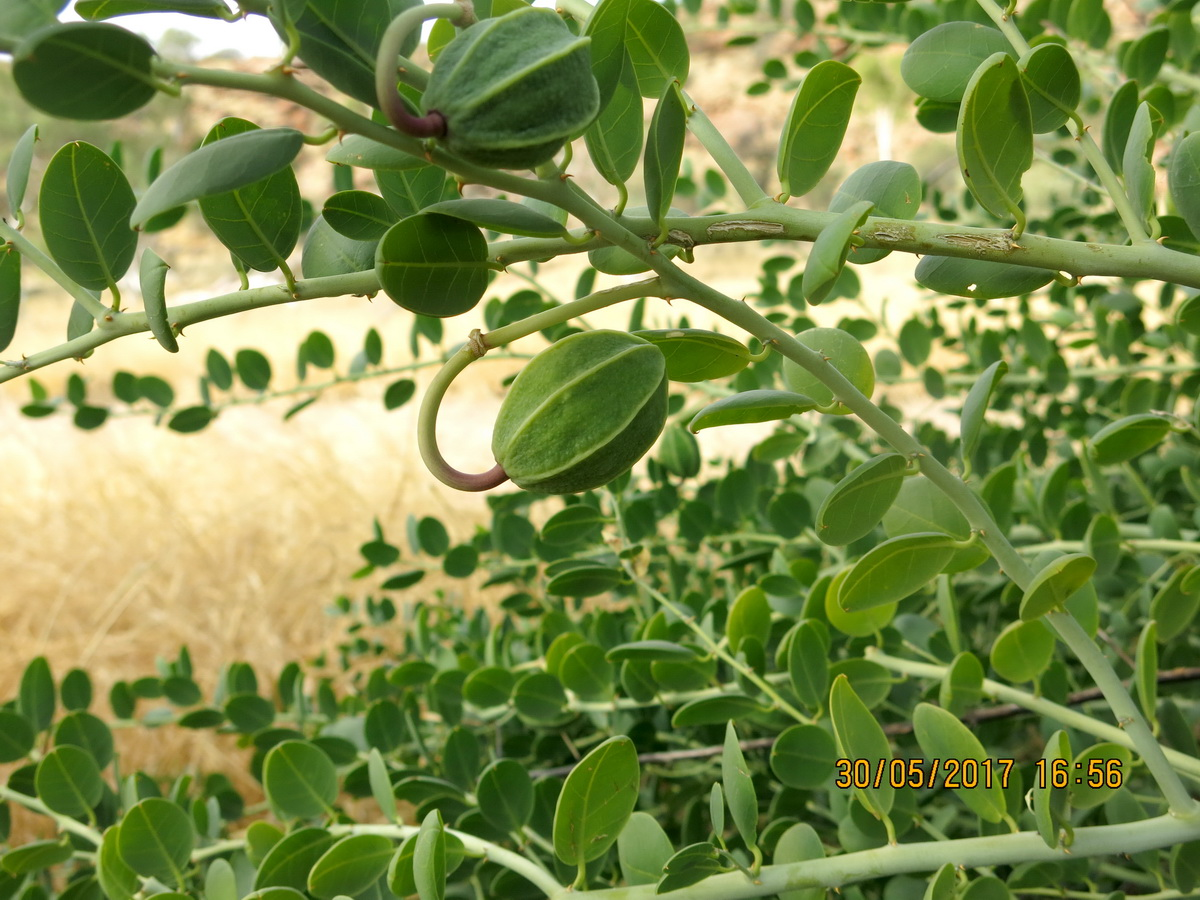
C.spinosa var nummularia fruit

Capparis is a genus of flowering plants in the family Capparaceae. It includes about 140 species of shrubs or lianas which are collectively known as caper shrubs or caperbushes. Capparis species occur over a wide range of habitat in the subtropical and tropical regions of Africa, Eurasia, Australasia, and the Pacific.

The genus was included in the family Brassicaceae in the unrevised APG II system.

== Plant description ==
The leaves are simple, entire, and rarely reduced. Flowers are bisexual, bracteates, axillary or supra-axillary, solitary or in rows, in racemes or umbels. Sepals and petals are 4 in number and are free. Stamens are many, ovary on a gynophore, one-celled. Fruit is a berry, globose or ellipsoid.

== Uses and ecology ==
Caperbushes are mainly used by humans for their fruit, which are rich in micronutrients. C. spinosa, simply known as caper, yields fruit and more importantly flower buds, which are widely used pickled as a vegetable condiment. The flower bud has been used since antiquity, and many classical authors indicate that the berry or small white blossom was commonly used as an aphrodisiac and a condiment. The plant is known in classical Hebrew as אֲבִיּוֹנָה, a word that appears in one verse of Scripture (Ecclesiastes 12:5).

The fruit of other species, such as karir (C. decidua), are also used for cooking; C. mitchellii and the Wild passionfruit (the local subspecies of C. spinosa) are well-known bush tucker in Australia. Mabinlang seeds (C. masaikai) are eaten as sweets.

Mabinlang is also used in Traditional Chinese Medicine. Aspalathos, the root of a shrub contained for example in the sacred Ancient Egyptian incense kp.t (kyphi), is sometimes considered to be C. spinosa. Other species have also recorded uses in herbalism and folk medicine; dedicated research is largely lacking however. Mabinlins are sweet-tasting proteins found in Mabinlang seed (and possibly in other Capparis species); at least one of them is highly resistant to heat. The market for mabinlins is not large, but this is mainly due to insufficient supply rather than to lack of demand.

The 1889 book The Useful Native Plants of Australia records that Capparis canescens was also referred to as "Mondoleu" by the indigenous people from Rockhampton area of Queensland and that "The fruit is pyriform and half an inch in diameter. It is eaten by the aborigines without any preparation." (Thozet.) Mr. P. O'Shanesy observes that the pulpy part in which these Australian species of Capparis are imbedded is a good substitute for mustard."

Caperbushes from arid regions - chiefly C. decidua - are highly useful in landscape gardening, afforestation and reforestation. They can stop soil erosion and preserve agricultural land. Any large-flowered species can be used to attract butterflies. The Crimson Rose (Atrophaneura hector), a spectacular swallowtail butterfly of South Asia, likes to visit flowers of C. spinosa in the winter months for example.

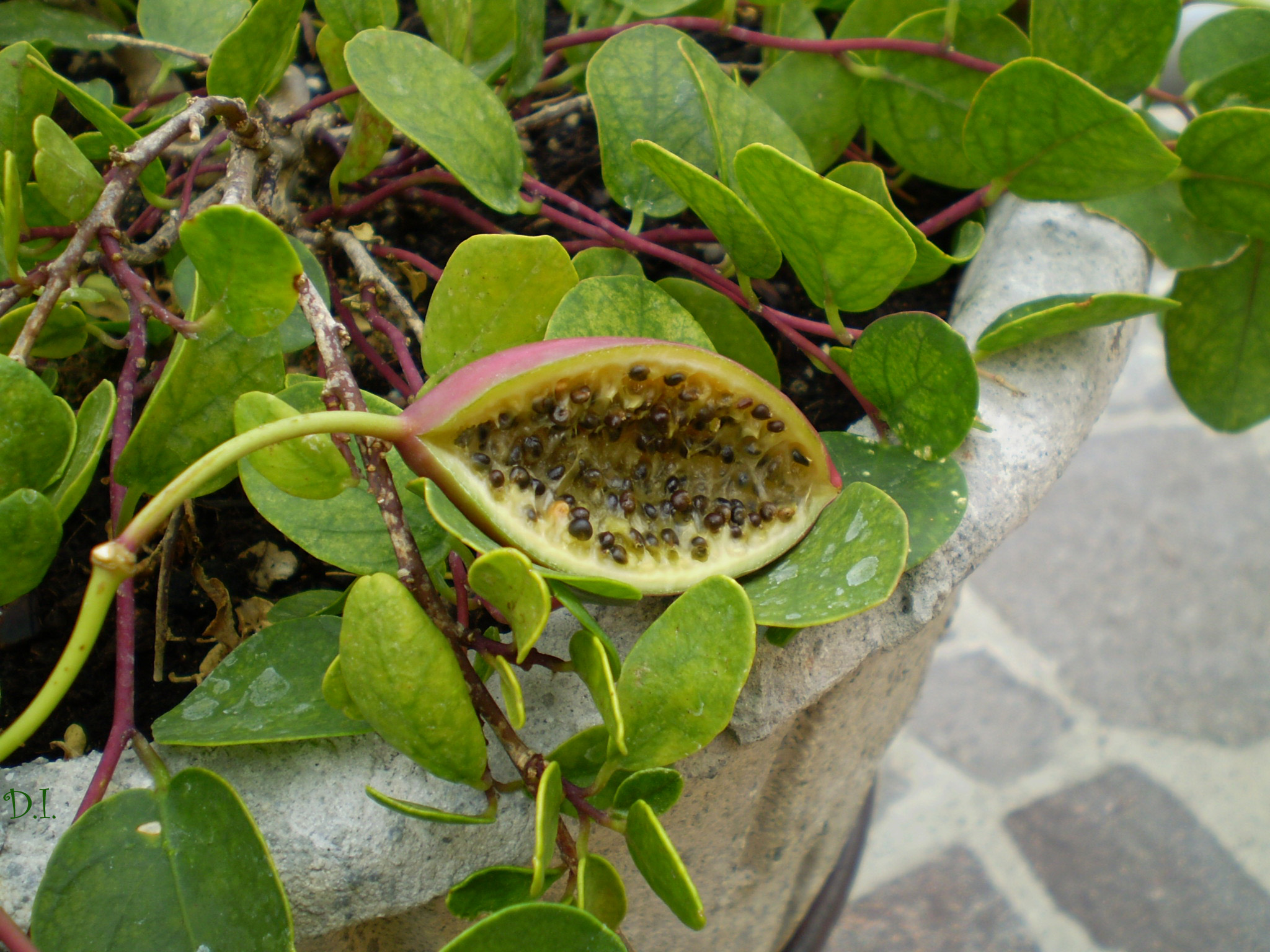
Many birds eat ripe Capparis spinosa fruit and seeds.

The fruit and seeds of caperbushes are relished by many birds and other animals such as spiny-tailed lizards. Capparis plants are highly important as food for certain Lepidoptera caterpillars, many of them being Pierinae:

- Appias lyncida (chocolate albatross) - recorded on C. heyneana and C. roxburghii.
- Astraptes fulgerator (two-barred flasher) - recorded on C. frondosa.
- Belenois aurota (caper white or pioneer) - recorded on C. zeylanica.
- Cepora nerissa (common gull) - mainly on C. zeylanica.
- Hebomoia glaucippe (great orangetip) - recorded on C. monii, C. roxburghii and C. sepiaria.
- Ixias marianne (white orangetip) - recorded on C. grandis, C. sepiaria, C. decidua, and C. divaricata.
- Leptosia nina (psyche) - recorded on C. zeylanica and others.
- Pareronia ceylanica (dark wanderer) - recorded on C. heydeana, C. rheedii
- Pareronia valeria (common wanderer) - recorded on C. zeylanica, C. rheedii, C. heydeana

The plant pathogenic ascomycete fungus Mycosphaerella capparis was described from a caperbush. Some species of Capparis are becoming rare, mainly due to habitat destruction, and a few are seriously threatened with extinction.

== Species ==
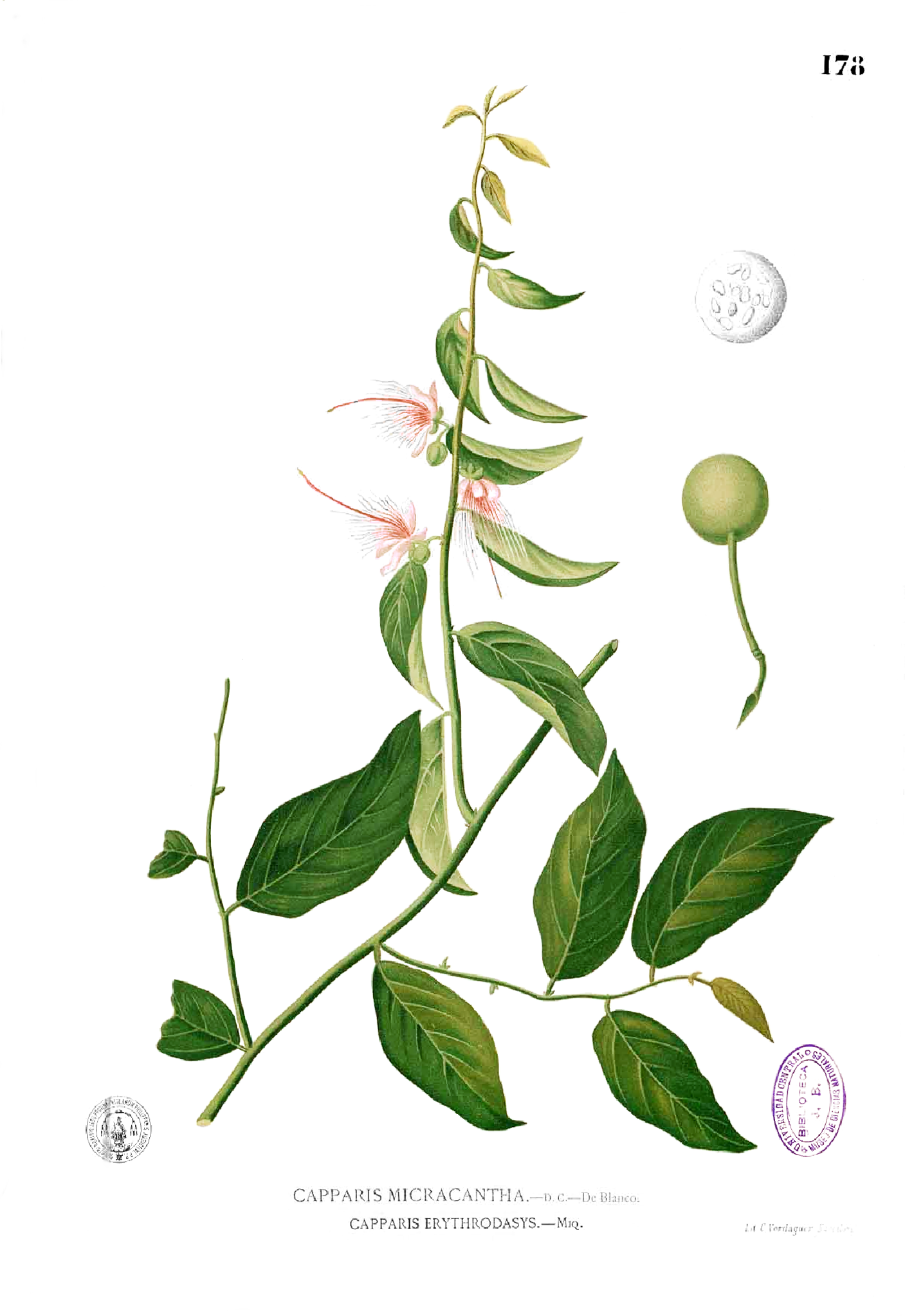
Drawing of Capparis micracantha, showing its parts. Francisco Manuel Blanco, Flora de Filipinas, etc (1880-1883)

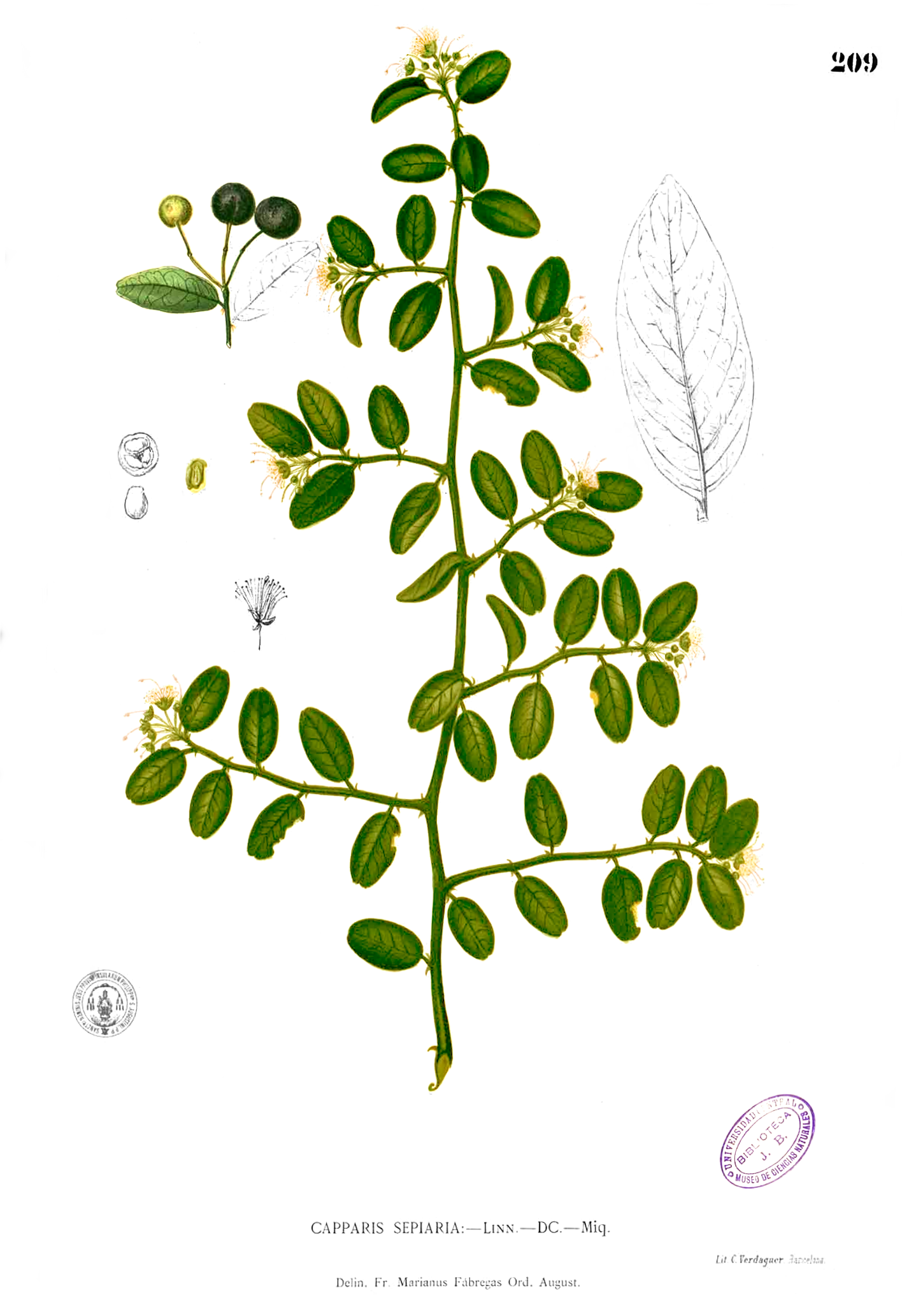
Drawing of Capparis "sepiaria", showing its parts. Francisco Manuel Blanco, Flora de Filipinas, etc. (1880-1883)

As of January 2026, Plants of the World Online accepts the following 146 species:

- Capparis acutifolia Sweet
- Capparis annamensis (Baker f.) M.Jacobs
- Capparis anomala (F.Muell.) Christenh. & Byng
- Capparis arborea (F.Muell.) Maiden
- Capparis artensis Montrouz.
- Capparis assamica Hook.f. & Thomson
- Capparis averyanovii Fici, Lanors. & Souvann.
- Capparis bachii Sy, R.K.Choudhary & Joongku Lee
- Capparis batianoffii Guymer
- Capparis beneolens Gagnep.
- Capparis bodinieri H.Lév.
- Capparis brachybotrya Hallier f.
- Capparis brassii DC.
- Capparis brevispina DC.
- Capparis burmanica Collett & Hemsl.
- Capparis buwaldae M.Jacobs
- Capparis callophylla Blume
- Capparis canescens Banks ex DC.
- Capparis cantoniensis Lour.
- Capparis cartilaginea Decne.
- Capparis cataphyllosa M.Jacobs
- Capparis chingiana B.S.Sun
- Capparis chrysomeia Bojer
- Capparis cinerea M.Jacobs
- Capparis cleghornii Dunn
- Capparis corymbosa Lam.
- Capparis cucurbitina King
- Capparis daknongensis Sy, G.C.Tucker, Cornejo & Joongku Lee
- Capparis danielii Murugan, R.Manik., S.P.Nithya, B.Karthik & Arisdason
- Capparis dasyphylla Merr. & F.P.Metcalf
- Capparis decidua (Forssk.) Edgew.
- Capparis diffusa Ridl.
- Capparis dioica Gilg
- Capparis divaricata Lam.
- Capparis diversifolia Wight & Arn.
- Capparis dongvanensis Sy, B.H.Quang & D.V.Hai
- Capparis echinocarpa Pierre ex Gagnep.
- Capparis erycibe Hallier f.
- Capparis erythrocarpos Isert
- Capparis fascicularis DC.
- Capparis fengii B.S.Sun
- Capparis flavicans Kurz
- Capparis floribunda Wight
- Capparis florida Fici & Souvann.
- Capparis fohaiensis B.S.Sun
- Capparis formosana Hemsl.
- Capparis fusifera Dunn
- Capparis gialaiensis Sy
- Capparis grandidieri Baill.
- Capparis grandiflora Wall. ex Hook.f. & Thomson
- Capparis grandis L.f.
- Capparis henryi Matsum.
- Capparis hereroensis Schinz
- Capparis heteracantha DC.
- Capparis himalayensis Jafri
- Capparis hinnamnoensis Souvann. & Fici
- Capparis humistrata (F.Muell.) F.Muell.
- Capparis hypovellerea Gilg & Gilg-Ben.
- Capparis incanescens DC.
- Capparis irenae Fici
- Capparis jacobsii Hewson
- Capparis kbangensis Sy & D.V.Hai
- Capparis kebarensis Fici
- Capparis kenaboiensis Julius
- Capparis khuamak Gagnep.
- Capparis klossii Ridl.
- Capparis koioides M.Jacobs
- Capparis kollimalayana M.B.Viswan.
- Capparis lanceolaris DC.
- Capparis lanceolatifolia Fici, Bouaman. & Souvann.
- Capparis laotica Gagnep.
- Capparis lasiantha R.Br. ex DC.
- Capparis lianosa Fici & Souvann.
- Capparis lobbiana Turcz.
- Capparis longestipitata Heine
- Capparis longgangensis S.L.Mo & X.S.Lee ex Y.S.Huang
- Capparis loranthifolia Lindl.
- Capparis macleishii (A.G.Mill.) Christenh. & Byng
- Capparis macrantha Souvann., Fici & Lanors.
- Capparis masaikai H.Lév.
- Capparis mekongensis Gagnep.
- Capparis membranifolia Kurz
- Capparis micracantha DC.
- Capparis micrantha A.Rich.
- Capparis mitchellii (F.Muell.) Lindl.
- Capparis monantha M.Jacobs
- Capparis moonii Wight
- Capparis multiflora Hook.f. & Thomson
- Capparis nilgiriensis Subba Rao, Kumari & V.Chandras.
- Capparis nobilis (Endl.) F.Muell. ex Benth.
- Capparis nummularia DC.
- Capparis olacifolia Hook.f. & Thomson
- Capparis ornans F.Muell. ex Benth.
- Capparis oxycarpa Fici, Aver. & Sy
- Capparis pachyphylla M.Jacobs
- Capparis parvifolia Fici
- Capparis phatadke Fici, Lanors., Lamxay & Souvann.
- Capparis poggei Pax
- Capparis pranensis (Pierre ex Gagnep.) M.Jacobs
- Capparis pseudocerasifera Hauman
- Capparis pubiflora DC.
- Capparis pubifolia B.S.Sun
- Capparis pyrifolia Lam.
- Capparis quiniflora DC.
- Capparis radula Gagnep.
- Capparis ramonensis Danin
- Capparis rheedei DC.
- Capparis richardii Baill.
- Capparis rigida M.Jacobs
- Capparis rotundifolia Rottler
- Capparis roxburghii DC.
- Capparis rufidula M.Jacobs
- Capparis sabiifolia Hook.f. & Thomson
- Capparis sandwichiana DC.
- Capparis sarmentosa A.Cunn. ex Benth.
- Capparis scortechinii King
- Capparis sepiaria L.
- Capparis shanesiana F.Muell.
- Capparis shevaroyensis Sundararagh.
- Capparis siamensis Kurz
- Capparis sikkimensis Kurz
- Capparis spinosa L.
- Capparis srilankensis Sundararagh.
- Capparis subacuta Miq.
- Capparis subsessilis B.S.Sun
- Capparis sunbisiniana M.L.Zhang & G.C.Tucker
- Capparis tagbanuorum Fici
- Capparis tchaourembensis Fici
- Capparis tenera Dalzell
- Capparis thorelii Gagnep.
- Capparis thozetiana (F.Muell.) F.Muell.
- Capparis tomentosa Lam.
- Capparis tonkinensis Gagnep.
- Capparis trichocarpa B.S.Sun
- Capparis trinervia Hook.f. & Thomson
- Capparis trisonthiae Srisanga & Chayam.
- Capparis umbonata Lindl.
- Capparis urophylla F.Chun
- Capparis velutina P.I.Forst.
- Capparis versicolor Griff.
- Capparis viburnifolia Gagnep.
- Capparis viminea Oliv.
- Capparis wui B.S.Sun
- Capparis yunnanensis Craib & W.W.Sm.
- Capparis zeylanica L.
- Capparis zippeliana Miq.

=== Formerly placed here ===
- Adansonia gregorii F.Muell. (as Capparis gibbosa A.Cunn.)
- Boscia albitrunca (Burch.) Gilg & Benedict (as C. albitrunca Burch.)
- Boscia oleoides (Burch. ex DC.) Toelken (as C. oleoides Burch. ex DC.)
- Crateva magna (Lour.) DC. (as C. magna Lour.)
- Morisonia flexuosa L. (as C. flexuosa (L.) L.) – Limber caper
- Morisonia hastata (Jacq.) Christenh. & Byng (as C. hastata – Broadleaf caper
- Morisonia heterophylla (Ruiz & Pav. ex DC.) Christenh. & Byng (as C. heterophylla Ruiz & Pav. ex DC.)
- Morisonia pulcherrima (Jacq.) Miers (as C. pulcherrima Jacq.)
- Morisonia retusa (Griseb.) Christenh. & Byng (as C. retusa Griseb.)
- Morisonia salicifolia (Griseb.) Christenh. & Byng (as C. salicifolia Griseb.)
- Morisonia scabrida (Kunth) Seem. (as C. scabrida Kunth)
- Morisonia speciosa (Griseb.) Cornejo & H.H.Iltis (as C. speciosa Griseb.)
- Ritchiea reflexa (Thonn. & Schumach.) Gilg & Gilg-Ben (as C. reflexa Thonn. & Schumach.)

== See also ==
- Caparica (Almada)
