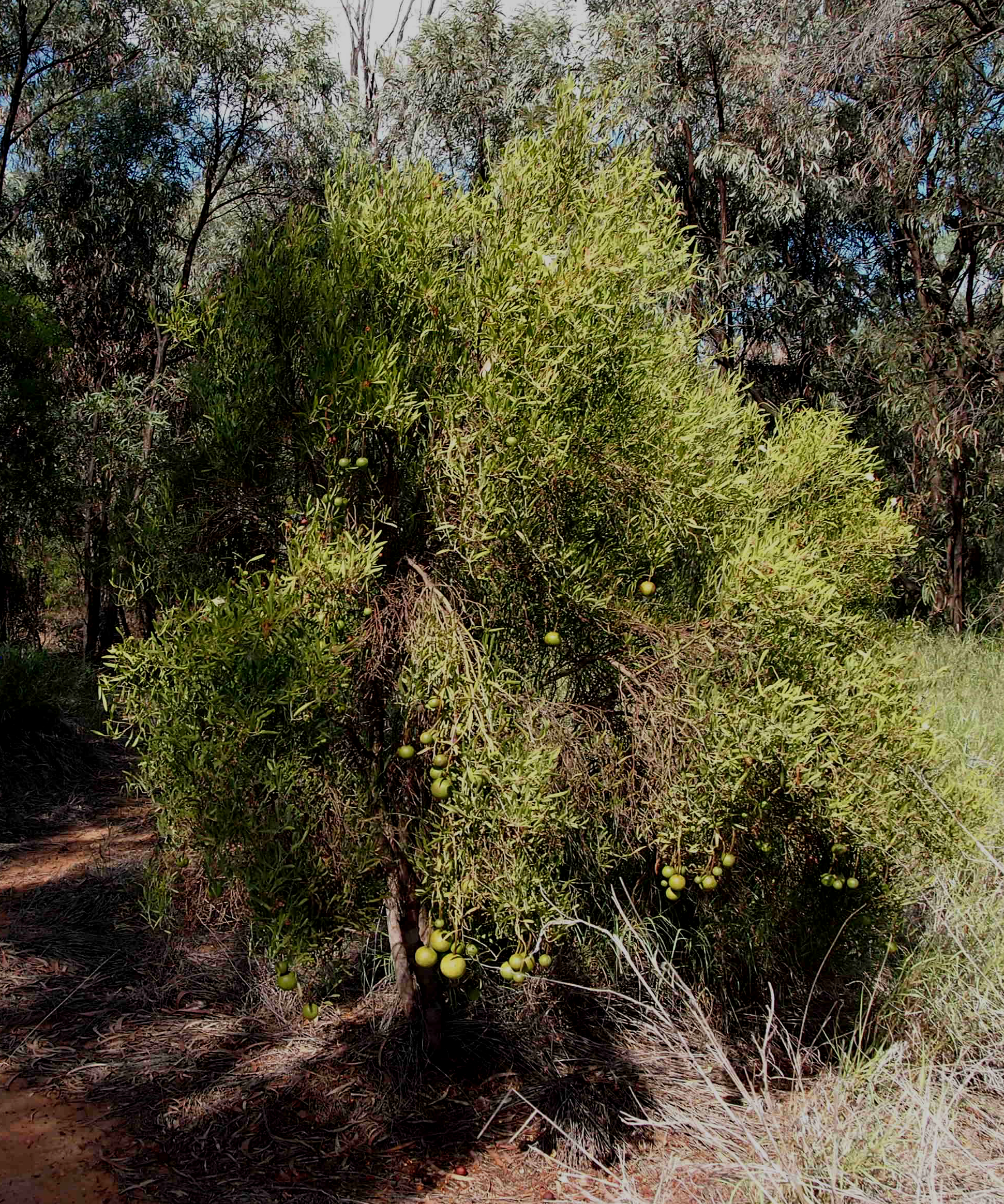

Scientific classification
- Kingdom: Plantae
- Clade: Tracheophytes
- Clade: Angiosperms
- Clade: Eudicots
- Clade: Rosids
- Order: Brassicales
- Family: Capparaceae
- Genus: Capparis
- Species: C. loranthifolia

Binomial name
- Capparis loranthifolia Lindl.
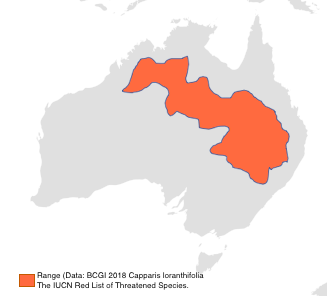

= Capparis loranthifolia =

Species of plant

Capparis loranthifolia, also known as the narrowleaf bumble or narrow-leaved bumble tree, is a shrub or small tree in the caper family. It is endemic to the arid and semi-arid interior of northern and eastern Australia from Western Australia to New South Wales.

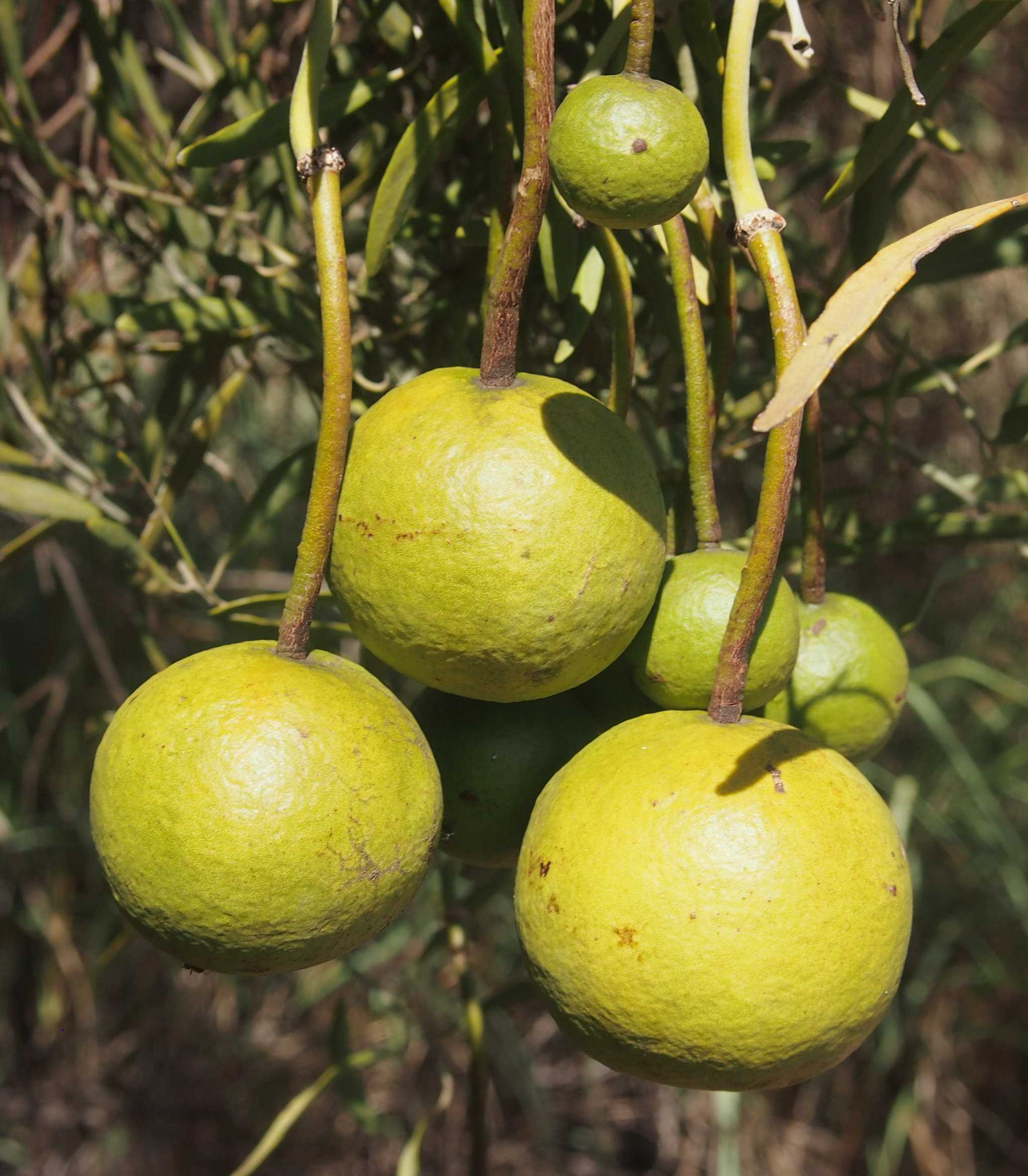
Fruit

== Infraspecific taxa ==
- Capparis loranthifolia var. loranthifolia
- Capparis loranthifolia var. bancroftii M.Jacobs

== Description ==
The species grows as a densely-foliaged, thorny shrub or stunted tree to 2–10 m in height. It has dark, grey-brown, fissured and cracked bark with thorns 4–7 mm long. It's simple, evergreen leaves are dark green, petiolate, 40–70 mm long by 8–14 mm wide. The cream-coloured flowers have 4 or 5 petals 20 mm long. The round fruits are 30–40 mm in diameter, with 7–8 mm long seeds. A survey of remnant brigalow woodland in Queensland provided various growth parameters for the species including maximum diameter at breast height of 24 cm, maximum height 10 m, maximum age 300 years and growth rate, growing to half its maximum size in 65 years.

== Taxonomy ==
Capparis loranthifolia was first formally described by botanist John Lindley in 1848 in Sir Thomas Mitchell's Journal of an Expedition into the Interior of Tropical Australia.

However, it was likely identified during an earlier expedition by Ludwig Leichhardt from Moreton Bay to Port Essington. When disaster struck the expedition and they ran low on resources, the specimens that Leichhardt had collected had to be discarded. Journals from the expedition were much later analysed and describe the same plant from between present day Emerald and Rockhampton, along with over 100 other species new to science had they made it to publication.

Capparis loranthifolia is one of 250 species of the Capparaceae Family. It is very similar to the Capparis mitchellii, that also evolved in Central Queensland after the genus dispersed to Australia from India. Both species have been referred to as Wild Orange, but C. loranthifolia is usually a smaller and more spiny plant.

Capparis loranthifolia var. bancroftii was originally thought to also be identified as a "deviating form" in New Caledonia. However, this was later discounted as taxonomic revision attributed these specimens to C. artensis var. dielsiana

Taxonomic synonymous with Busbeckea lorantifolia and Busbeckea loranthifolia.

== Distribution ==
Capparis loranthifolia is endemic to Australia's arid and semi-arid interior, from Northern New South Wales, Queensland, Northern Territory to the Kimberley in Western Australia. Although generally an inland species, a small population of the loranthifolia variety reaches the coast at Rockhampton. The range of Capparis loranthifolia var. bancroftii is restricted to Central Queensland. In NSW, several populations have been identified in Culgoa National Park.

== Ecology ==
It is found in fine red soil, and in brown silty clay-loam near creeks, and primarily is found in the understory of softwood shrublands and woodlands with Eucalyptus populnea, E. melanophloia, E. microtheca, E. crebra, Geijera parviflora, Acacia aneura, A. oswaldii, A. harpophylla, A. catenulata, Eremophila mitchellii, Atalaya spp. and Triodia spp. It is a known host of parasitic mistletoe species Lysiana subfalcata and Lysiana spathulata.

The fruits are food for many species including birds, whom disperse the seeds. It is also noted in the diet of the Common Brushtail Possum in central Australia, and domestic livestock. Being tolerant of dry conditions, the bush provides supplement foraging for livestock during drought.

It flowers from September to December, when the fruit ripens, in the early part of the wet season.

== Traditional uses ==
The fruit has been noted as utilised by many different Indigenous groups of Northern Australia, although not a large part of the diet, given its limited temporal supply. The Kukatja people in the Western Desert ate the fruit (Yidaringgi in local language) whenever it was available, picked and eaten directly. The Alyawara people of the Northern Territory consumed the fruit whenever it was available, sometimes collecting it in large quantities just before it ripened and burying it for several days in hot sand to present birds and insects from eating it.

With the majority of grazing properties in Western Queensland containing the plants, it was assessed by Queensland's Department of Primary Industry for feasibility as part of a bush foods industry to supplement low beef prices and recommended for further study.

== Conservation ==
Last assessed in 2018, Capparis loranthifolia is listed as Least Concern on the IUCN Red List, with a wide distribution and stable population. Whilst not listed as threatened in Queensland, where it is relatively common, nor nationally, Capparis loranthifolia var. loranthifolia is listed in New South Wales as Endangered, with a small distribution in the north-western plains, which is threatened by erosion and degradation from rabbits, goats and other livestock. Capparis loranthifolia is a common understory bush in many threatened ecological communities including Poplar Box Woodland, Brigalow Woodland and Coolibah - Black Box Woodlands of the Darling Riverine Plains and the Brigalow Belt South Bioregions, all Endangered under the EPBC Act after suffering extensive clearing for agriculture since European settlement.
