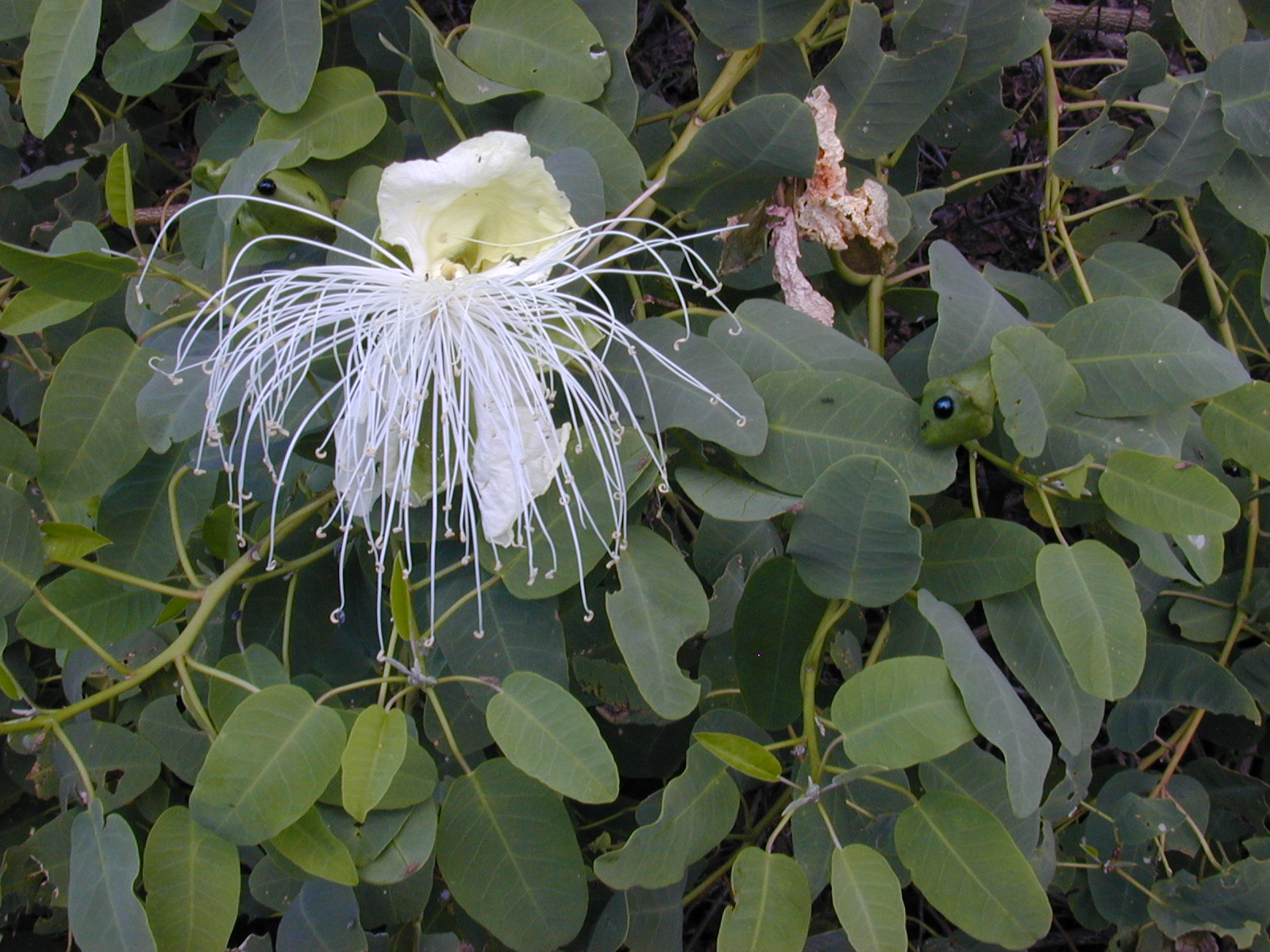

Conservation status
- Vulnerable (IUCN 3.1)

Scientific classification
- Kingdom: Plantae
- Clade: Tracheophytes
- Clade: Angiosperms
- Clade: Eudicots
- Clade: Rosids
- Order: Brassicales
- Family: Capparaceae
- Genus: Capparis
- Species: C. sandwichiana

Binomial name
- Capparis sandwichiana DC.

= Capparis sandwichiana =

Species of flowering plant

Capparis sandwichiana is a species of flowering plant in the Capparaceae family endemic to the Hawaiian Islands. Common names include maiapilo, pua pilo, and Hawaiian caper. C. sandwichiana can be found on the main islands, Midway Atoll, the Pearl and Hermes Atoll, and Laysan. It inhabits coastal low shrublands and rocky shores at elevations from sea level to 325 feet (99 m). Maiapilo is listed as vulnerable by the IUCN and is threatened by grazing, competition with invasive species, and habitat destruction.
