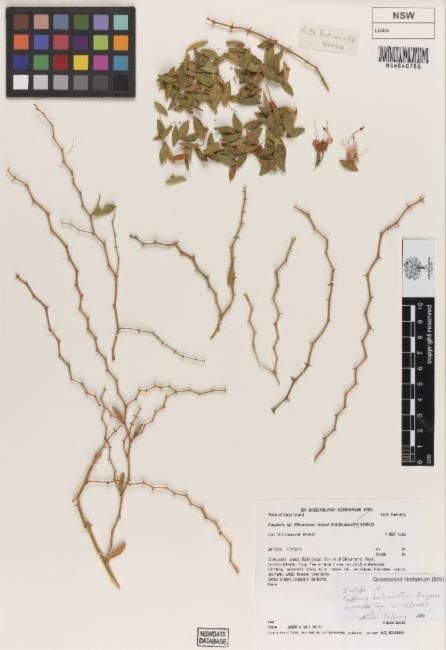
- NSW840786 (CC-BY 4.0, National Herbarium of New South Wales)

Conservation status
- Vulnerable (NCA)

Scientific classification
- Kingdom: Plantae
- Clade: Embryophytes
- Clade: Tracheophytes
- Clade: Spermatophytes
- Clade: Angiosperms
- Clade: Eudicots
- Clade: Rosids
- Order: Brassicales
- Family: Capparaceae
- Genus: Capparis
- Species: C. batianoffii

Binomial name
- Capparis batianoffii Guymer

= Capparis batianoffii =

Species of plant

Capparis batianoffii is a species of flowering plant in the family Capparaceae, which was first described in 2008 by Gordon Guymer. The species epithet honours G.N. Batianoff who collected the holotype. It is found only in Queensland.

This is a climbing shrub, growing to 6 ft tall. The leaves are simple and in the one plane. Both stem and leaves are covered in sandy-coloured hairs.

== Distribution & habitat ==
This species is only known to occur in Central Queensland on Gloucester Island in the Gloucester Island National Park. It is found in the regional ecosystem 8.12.11 containing Araucarian vine thickets on slopes on granitic boulders near sea level to 400 meters in elevation.

== Conservation status ==
Capparis batianoffii is listed as "vulnerable" under the Queensland Nature Conservation Act 1992. It is not listed under the Australian Environment Protection and Biodiversity Conservation Act 1999.
