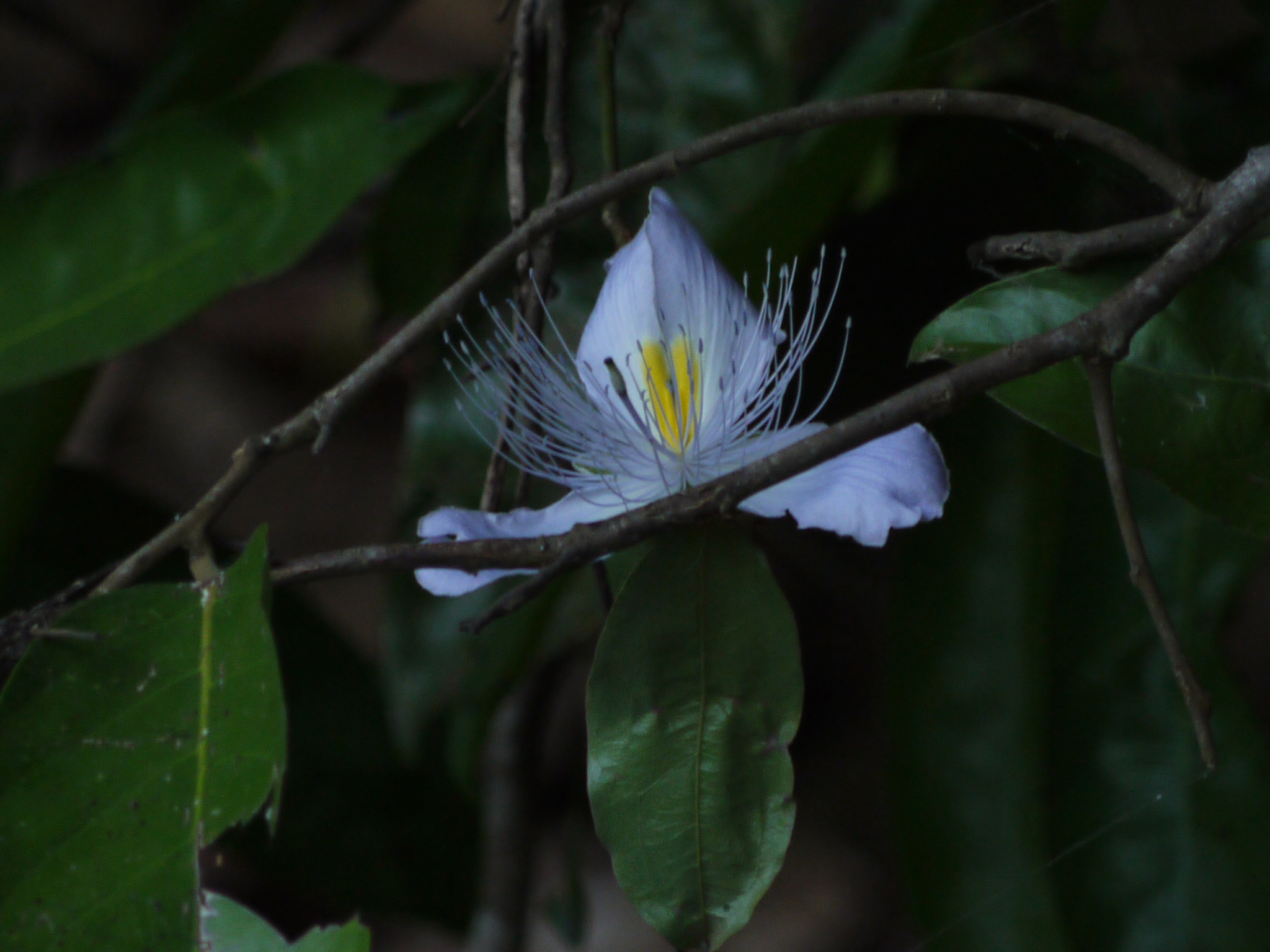

Conservation status
- Vulnerable (IUCN 3.1)

Scientific classification
- Kingdom: Plantae
- Clade: Tracheophytes
- Clade: Angiosperms
- Clade: Eudicots
- Clade: Rosids
- Order: Brassicales
- Family: Capparaceae
- Genus: Capparis
- Species: C. rheedei

Binomial name
- Capparis rheedei DC.

= Capparis rheedei =

Species of flowering plant

Capparis rheedei is a species of flowering plant in the Capparaceae family endemic to the low-elevation tropical rainforests of the southern Western Ghats.It is popularly known as Rheed's wild caper or Malabar caper.

== Description ==
It is an erect shrub, typically 2–4 m tall. Young branches are brown and velvety, later becoming smooth, and the shoots bear short, straight spines. The leaves are elliptic-ovate to lanceolate with a narrow tip. Flowers are showy, white to lilac, sometimes with bluish wings, measuring 3–5 cm across, and usually occur singly in the leaf axils or occasionally in condensed racemes.

== Uses ==
Capparis rheedei has been reported in traditional medicine for a variety of uses. Preparations of the plant are employed as a diuretic and sedative, and are also used in the treatment of skin ailments and spasms. In some practices, it is considered to have emmenagogue properties, being used to stimulate or regulate menstruation.. These uses are based on traditional knowledge, and there is limited scientific evidence to support their efficacy.
