= Capparis micrantha =

Scientific classification
- Kingdom: Plantae
- Clade: Tracheophytes
- Clade: Angiosperms
- Clade: Eudicots
- Clade: Rosids
- Order: Brassicales
- Family: Capparaceae
- Genus: Capparis
- Species: C. micrantha

Binomial name
- Capparis micrantha A. Rich.

Species of flowering plant

Capparis micrantha is a species of climbing shrub in the family Capparaceae. The recorded distribution includes Malesia and Indo-China and it may be called cáp gai nhỏ in Vietnam.

In contrast, the Catalogue of Life or Plants of the World Online which record its distribution as Ethiopia and South Sudan, with no subspecies listed.
