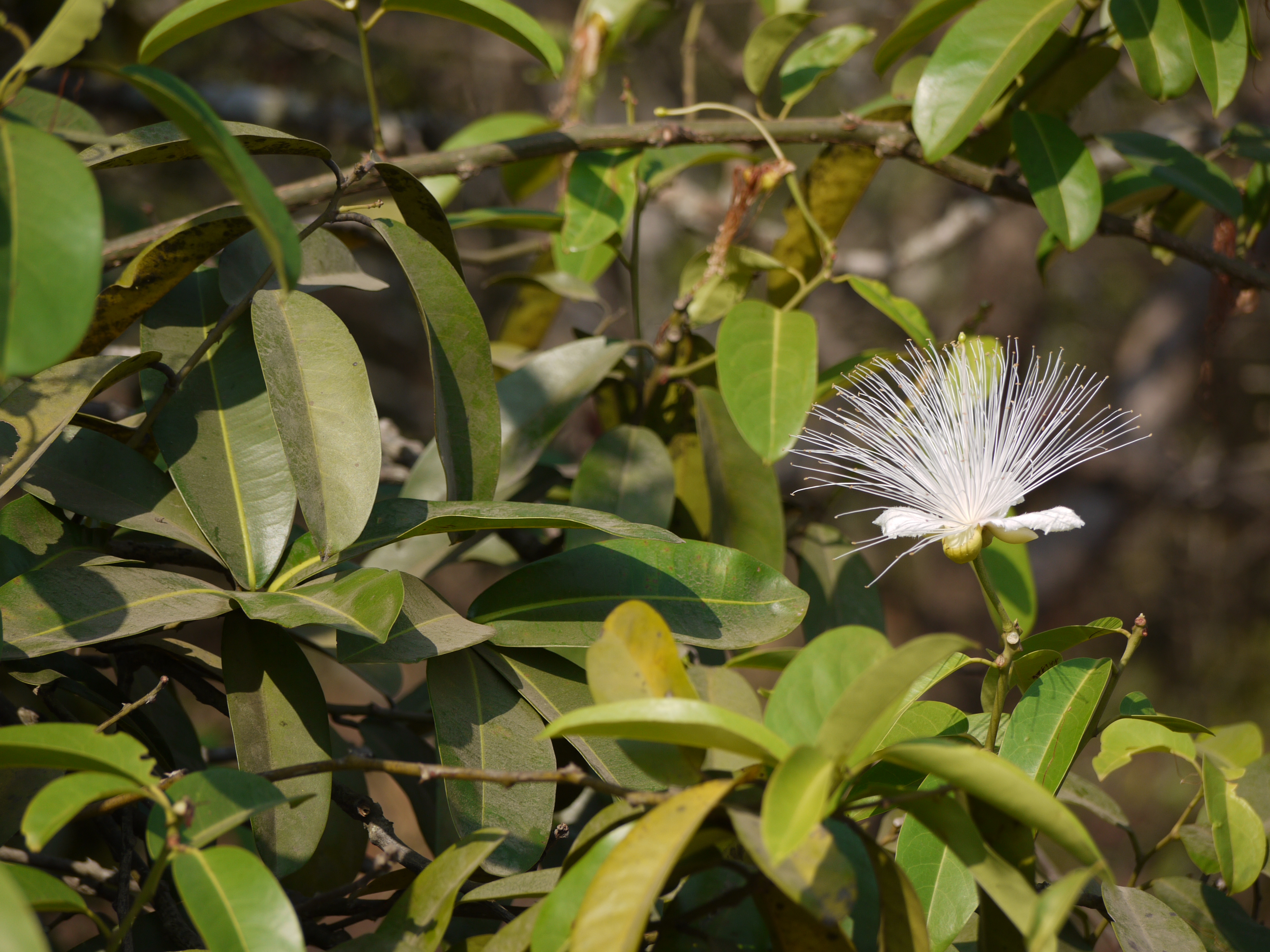

Scientific classification
- Kingdom: Plantae
- Clade: Tracheophytes
- Clade: Angiosperms
- Clade: Eudicots
- Clade: Rosids
- Order: Brassicales
- Family: Capparaceae
- Genus: Capparis
- Species: C. moonii

Binomial name
- Capparis moonii Wight

= Capparis moonii =

Species of flowering plant

Capparis moonii is a woody climber, belonging to the family Capparaceae which is native to India and Sri Lanka. It was described by Robert Wight in his Illustrations of Indian Botany in 1840.
