= Capparis tonkinensis =

Scientific classification
- Kingdom: Plantae
- Clade: Tracheophytes
- Clade: Angiosperms
- Clade: Eudicots
- Clade: Rosids
- Order: Brassicales
- Family: Capparaceae
- Genus: Capparis
- Species: C. tonkinensis

Binomial name
- Capparis tonkinensis Gagnep.

Species of flowering plant

Capparis tonkinensis is a species of climbing shrub in the family Capparaceae. The recorded distribution is restricted to Viet Nam where it may be called cáp bắc bộ. No subspecies are listed in the Catalogue of Life.
