= Capparis spinosa subsp. nummularia =

Scientific classification
- Kingdom: Plantae
- Clade: Tracheophytes
- Clade: Angiosperms
- Clade: Eudicots
- Clade: Rosids
- Order: Brassicales
- Family: Capparaceae
- Genus: Capparis
- Species: C. nummularia

Binomial name
- Capparis nummularia DC.

Subspecies of fruit and plant

Capparis nummularia, the wild passionfruit, or (locally) caperbush, is an Australian native plant. It is a subspecies of the caper adapted to deserts. The species was formerly considered to be a subspecies of Capparis spinosa.

Its name in the Arrernte language of Central Australia is Merne arrutnenge.

Wild passionfruit is a bush tucker food. When it ripens, the skin turns orange and splits open and the little black seeds become visible. It is then ready to eat. The seeds are hot and spicy when crushed. It grows prolifically in riverbanks in the desert.
