= Capparis pachyphylla =

Conservation status
- Endangered (IUCN 2.3)

Scientific classification
- Kingdom: Plantae
- Clade: Tracheophytes
- Clade: Angiosperms
- Clade: Eudicots
- Clade: Rosids
- Order: Brassicales
- Family: Capparaceae
- Genus: Capparis
- Species: C. pachyphylla

Binomial name
- Capparis pachyphylla Jacobs

Species of flowering plant

Capparis pachyphylla is a species of plant in the family Capparaceae. It is a shrub or tree native to Arunachal Pradesh (Aka Hills) and southeastern Tibet.
