= Capparis pyrifolia =

Scientific classification
- Kingdom: Plantae
- Clade: Tracheophytes
- Clade: Angiosperms
- Clade: Eudicots
- Clade: Rosids
- Order: Brassicales
- Family: Capparaceae
- Genus: Capparis
- Species: C. pyrifolia

Binomial name
- Capparis pyrifolia Lam.

Synonyms
- Capparis foetida Bl. Capparis dasypetala Turcz. Capparis acuminata Willd. ex Wall.

Species of flowering plant

Capparis pyrifolia is a species of climbing shrub in the family Capparaceae. The recorded distribution includes Indo-China and Malesia. It may be called cáp lá xá xị (cáp có múi) in Vietnam. No subspecies are listed in the Catalogue of Life.
