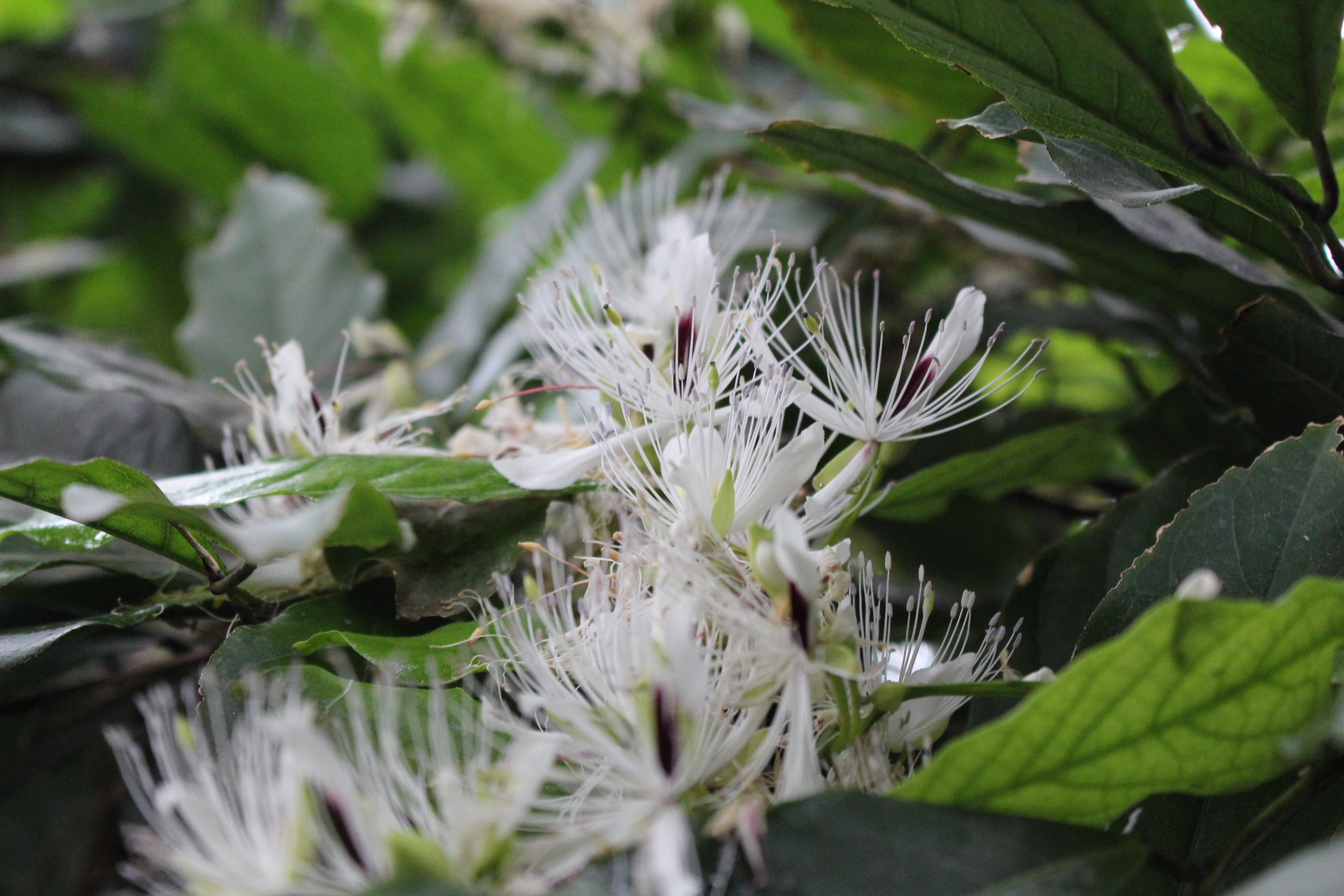
- Flowers

Scientific classification
- Kingdom: Plantae
- Clade: Tracheophytes
- Clade: Angiosperms
- Clade: Eudicots
- Clade: Rosids
- Order: Brassicales
- Family: Capparaceae
- Genus: Capparis
- Species: C. micracantha

Binomial name
- Capparis micracantha DC.

= Capparis micracantha =

Species of flowering plant

Capparis micracantha is a species of flowering plant in the caper family (Capparaceae). It grows as a shrub or small tree, sometimes with a more or less climbing habit.

It is native to Southeast Asia - the Andaman and Nicobar Islands, Indochina, Indonesia and the Philippines. Certain parts of the plant are locally used as a source of medicines and rarely for food.

== Subspecies ==
The Catalogue of Life lists:

- The nominate subspecies C. micracantha micracantha
- C. micracantha korthalsiana (Miq.) M.Jacobs (was C. korthalsiana Miq.)
- C. micracantha var. henryi (Matsum.) M.Jacobs (a synonym of C. henryi) is accepted in the Plant List.

== Gallery ==
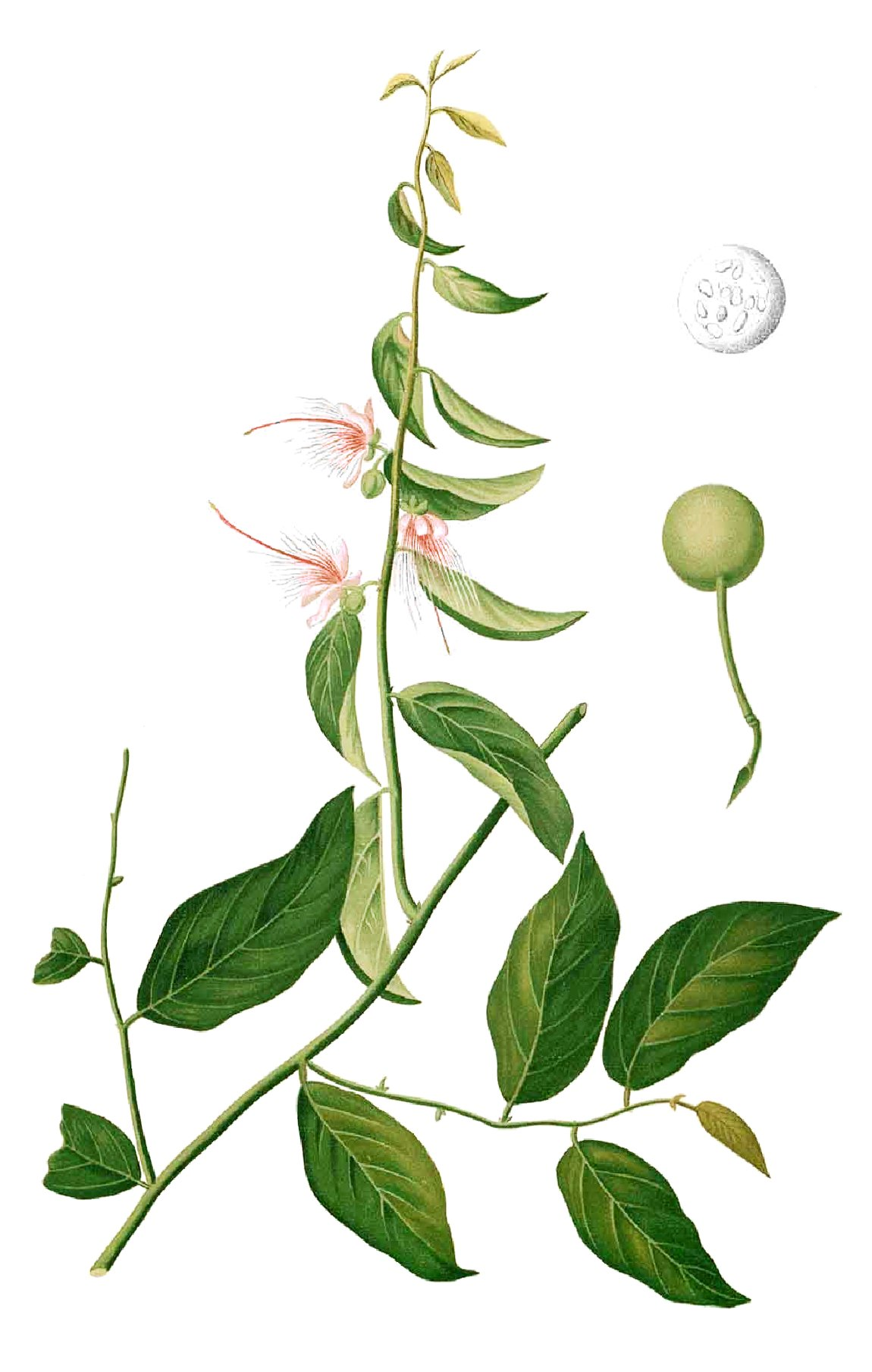

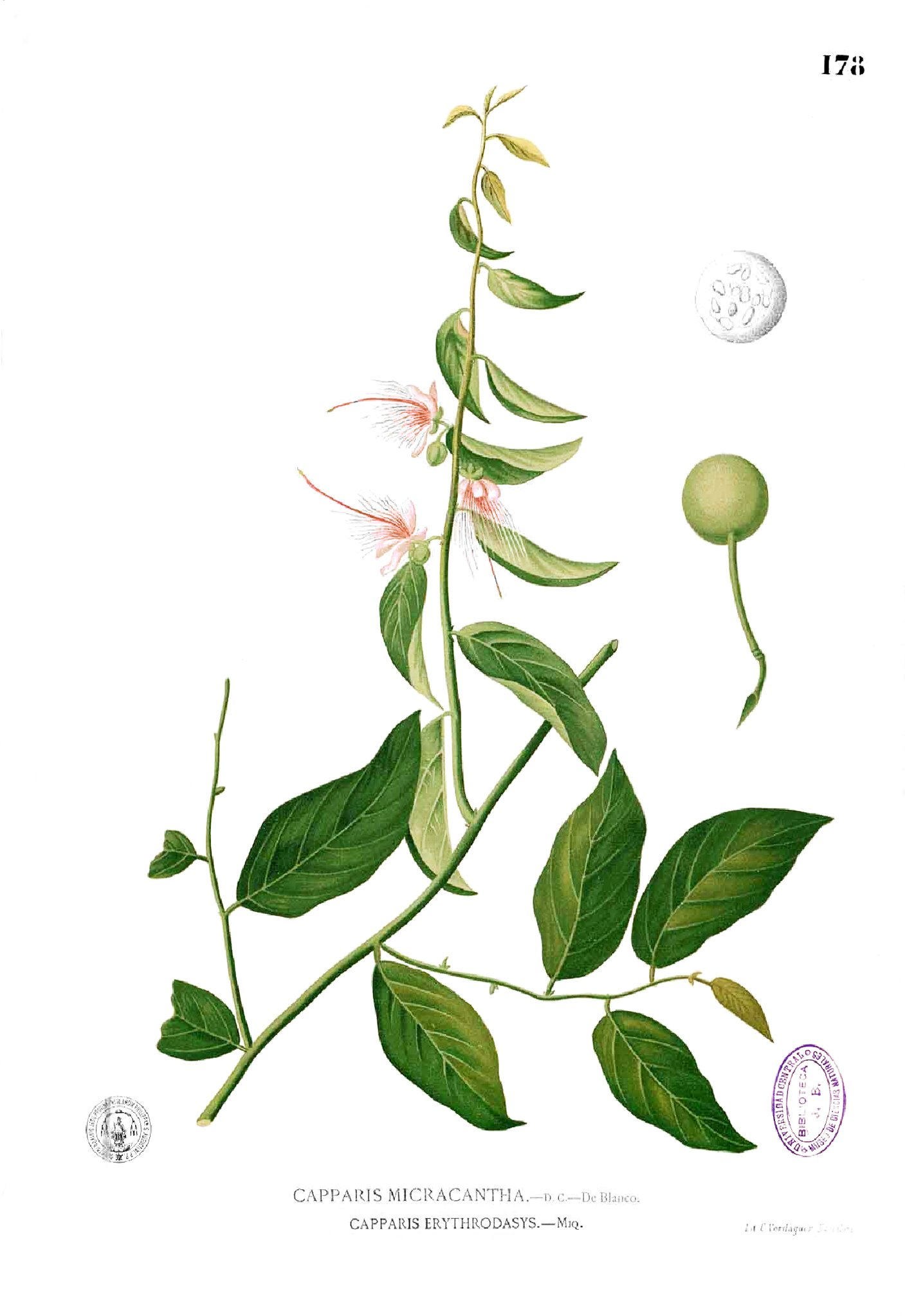
