= Capparis acutifolia =

Scientific classification
- Kingdom: Plantae
- Clade: Tracheophytes
- Clade: Angiosperms
- Clade: Eudicots
- Clade: Rosids
- Order: Brassicales
- Family: Capparaceae
- Genus: Capparis
- Species: C. acutifolia

Binomial name
- Capparis acutifolia Sweet

Synonyms
- Capparis tenuifolia Hayata; Capparis membranacea var. puberula B. S. Sun; Capparis membranacea var. angustissima Hemsl. Capparis membranacea Gardn. & Champ. Capparis leptophylla Hayata; Capparis kikuchii Hayata; Capparis chinensis G. Don; Capparis acuminata Lindl.

Species of flowering plant

Capparis acutifolia is a species of shrub in the family Capparaceae. The recorded distribution includes India, China, and Indo-China. It may be called cáp xoan ngược in Vietnam.

== Subspecies ==
No subspecies are listed in the Catalogue of Life, but GRIN records:

- C. acutifolia subsp. acutifolia
- C. acutifolia subsp. bodinieri
- C. acutifolia subsp. viminea
