= Capparis radula =

Scientific classification
- Kingdom: Plantae
- Clade: Tracheophytes
- Clade: Angiosperms
- Clade: Eudicots
- Clade: Rosids
- Order: Brassicales
- Family: Capparaceae
- Genus: Capparis
- Species: C. radula

Binomial name
- Capparis radula Gagnep.

Species of flowering plant

Capparis radula is a species of climbing shrub in the family Capparaceae. The recorded distribution includes Indo-China and may be called cáp (bán nao) in Vietnam. No subspecies are listed in the Catalogue of Life.
