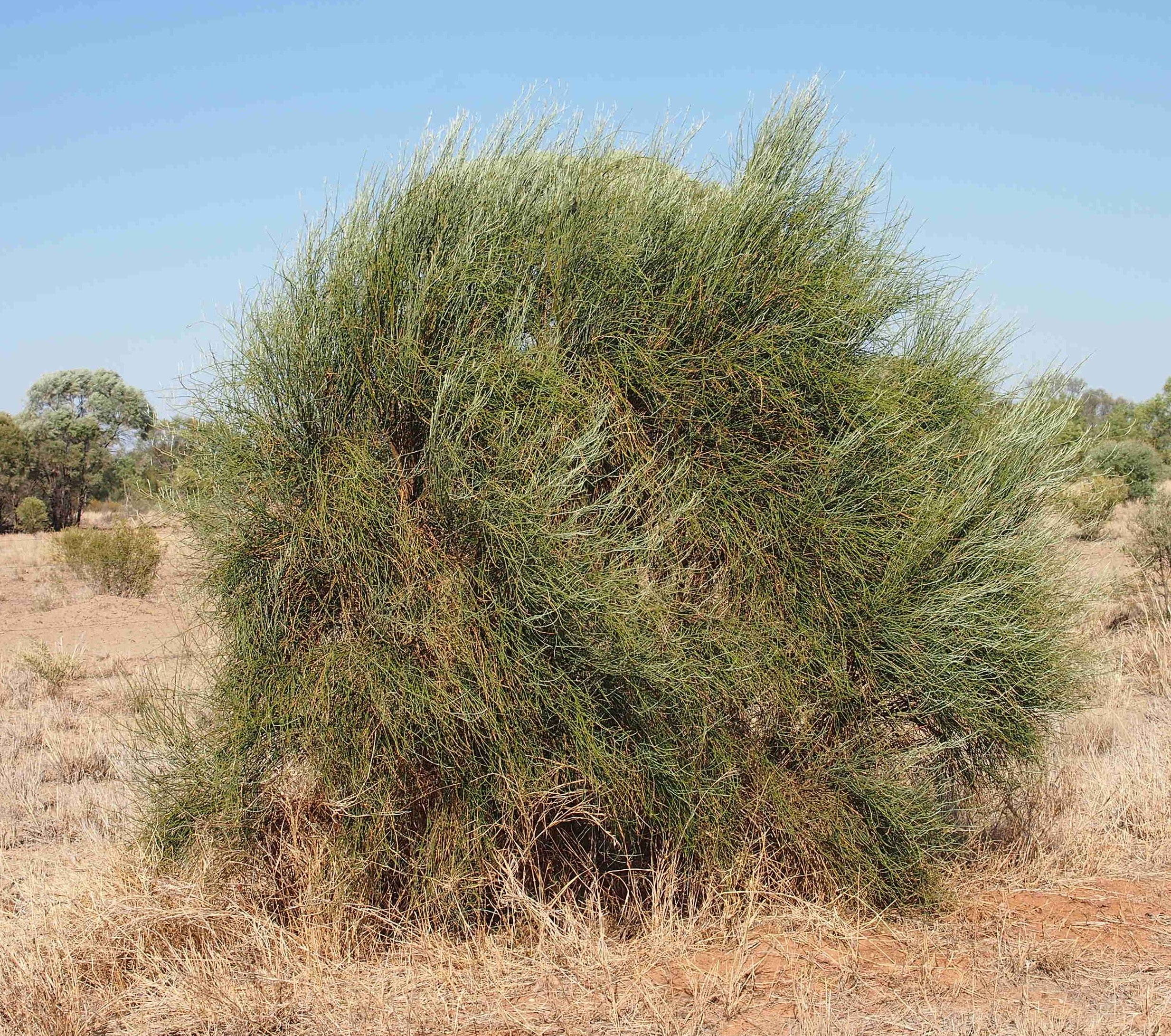

Scientific classification
- Kingdom: Plantae
- Clade: Tracheophytes
- Clade: Angiosperms
- Clade: Eudicots
- Clade: Rosids
- Order: Brassicales
- Family: Capparaceae
- Genus: Capparis
- Species: C. anomala

Binomial name
- Capparis anomala (F.Muell.) Christenh. & Byng (2018)

Synonyms
- Apophyllum anomalum F.Muell. (1857)

= Capparis anomala =

Genus of flowering plants

Capparis anomala is a species of flowering plant, commonly called warrior bush or broom bush, which is native to Australia.

== Description & habitat ==
It is widespread in semi-arid areas in Australia and predominant within New South Wales and Queensland. The plant is a shrub 3-5m high with leafless, sometimes drooping in older branches. This species leaves are linear to lanceolate 5-15mm long and its flowers are unisexual, blooming either in clusters or single, with 3-4 hairy sepals 2-3mm long and 2-5 petals 2-5mm long and are greenish white to yellow in colour. Male flowers with 8-6 stamens, as long as the petals. Female flowers with 1-3 stamens, ovary on a gymnophore 2-3mm long. Fruits are globous, purple, 5-8mm in diameter. The warrior bush flowers in spring to early summer.

The warrior bush is not usually more than a small bush, however it sometimes develops into a small tree like the specimen, the largest recorded being still only approximately 4 metres high. The young branches and berries are browsed by stock and frequently grazed on by wild goats. When it is flowering during November and December, the warrior bush attracts clouds of black and white migratory caper white butterflies, and their larvae frequently cause much damage. The sight of these butterflies encompassing this harsh shrub is an unusual image for a species which in a sense has no foliage to speak of. The timber of the warrior bush is surprisingly dense and close grained with a very fine medullary ray making this species highly drought resistant. It has also been noted that macropods such as kangaroos and wallabies are commonly associated with the habitat of the warrior bush.

== Ecology ==
The warrior bush was described by a government botanist by the name of Ferdinand von Mueller around 1855. One of Muller's many achievements was the establishment of the National Herbarium of Victoria. Several years after its establishment in 1853, Mueller describe species as Apophyllum anomalum and introduced it into the National Herbarium of Victoria where 19.8% of the species recordings are found today. Between the National Herbarium of New South Wales and the Herbarium of Queensland there is currently, according to The Australian Plant Census, a total of 53% of the country's warrior bush recordings to be found. The species was renamed Capparis anomala in 2018.

== Threats ==
The semi-arid zone presented by the warrior bush's habitat is a tough, wild and dry environment. During the settlement of Europeans and expeditions of those such as Oxley, Sturt and Mitchell it was a very harsh setting. This settlement put many of the environment's species under threat and although the warrior bush was not significantly impacted, it was similarly affected. Squatters ventured into the zone and with the discovery of artesian water, rapid expansion and intensification of pastoralism across the region began. These changes in the Australian environment since have included: displacement of Indigenous Australians, disruption of natural fire régimes and forestry practices which have modified the structure of native vegetation zones.

As the warrior bush is currently abundant within its vegetation zone, we may consider current animal grazing patterns, agriculture and forestry practices which have the potential to pose future threats to the Apophyllum species. These may include widespread overstocking of sheep and cattle which graze on the warrior bush and cause major soil erosion. In semi-arid areas, goats further add to this excessive grazing pressure on herbage and shrubs. The diet of a bush goat is primarily influenced by what choice is available. Bush goats are herbivores and are commonly found in semi-arid areas of Australia and are recorded to find the warrior bush to be palatable. There appears to be a correlation between growth and breeding rates of feral goats in semi-arid vegetation zones where herbage and shrub such as the warrior bush are prevalent, this in turn affects the regeneration of the species as well as damaging their growth when trampled.

Large scale land-clearing for crops, grazing and urban development has reduced native vegetation cover including the warrior bush and led to landscape salinisation, increased sediment, nutrient and salt loads in rivers and streams, loss of habitat and a decline in biodiversity. As a general note, we see introduced and invasive plant and animal species into any ecosystem is a major threat to floral biodiversity; 20 introduced species have been declared Weeds of National Significance (many of which are located within the semi-arid vegetation zones of the warrior bush) and since European settlement of Australia, 61 plant species are known to have become extinct; a further 1,239 species are presently considered threatened. Fortunately, the warrior bush is not classified as a threatened flora species and its conservation status classifies as "LC" - least concern.
