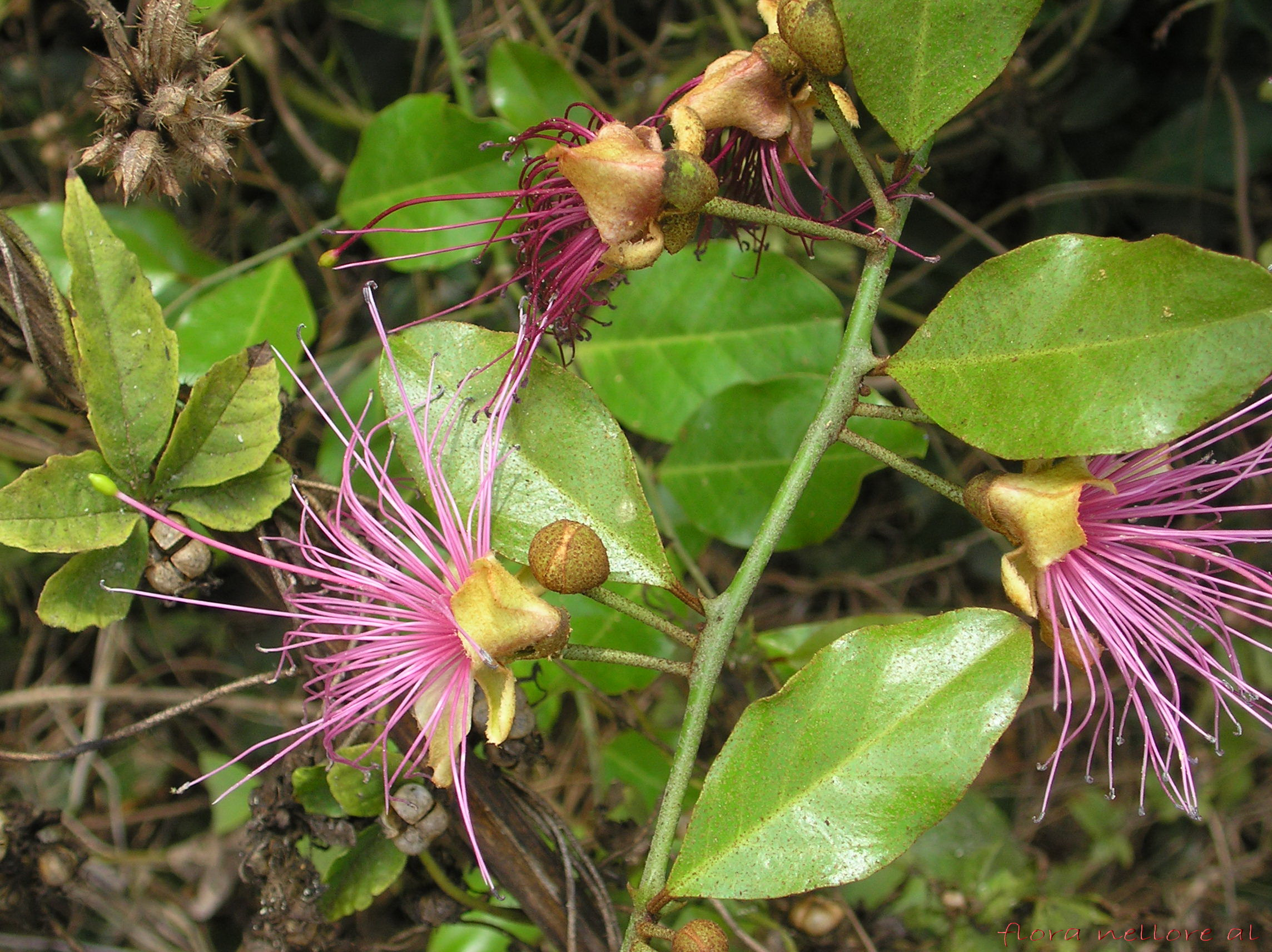
- Flowers and leaves of Capparis zeylanica

Scientific classification
- Kingdom: Plantae
- Clade: Tracheophytes
- Clade: Angiosperms
- Clade: Eudicots
- Clade: Rosids
- Order: Brassicales
- Family: Capparaceae
- Genus: Capparis
- Species: C. zeylanica

Binomial name
- Capparis zeylanica L.

Synonyms
- Capparis acuminata Roxb.; Capparis acuminata De Wild., nom. illeg.; Capparis aeylanica Roxb.; Capparis aurantioides C.Presl; Capparis crassifolia Kurz; Capparis dealbata DC.; Capparis erythrodasys Miq.; Capparis hastigera Hance; Capparis hastigera var. obcordata Merr. & F.P.Metcalf; Capparis horrida L.f.; Capparis horrida var. erythrodasys (Miq.) Miq.; Capparis horrida var. paniculata Gagnep.; Capparis latifolia Craib; Capparis linearis Blanco, nom. illeg.; Capparis myrioneura var. latifolia Hallier f.; Capparis nemorosa Blanco, nom. illeg.; Capparis polymorpha Kurz; Capparis quadriflora DC.; Capparis rufescens Turcz.; Capparis subhorrida Craib; Capparis swinhoii Hance; Capparis terniflora DC.; Capparis wightiana Wall., nom. inval.; Capparis xanthophylla Collett & Hemsl.

= Capparis zeylanica =

Species of flowering plant

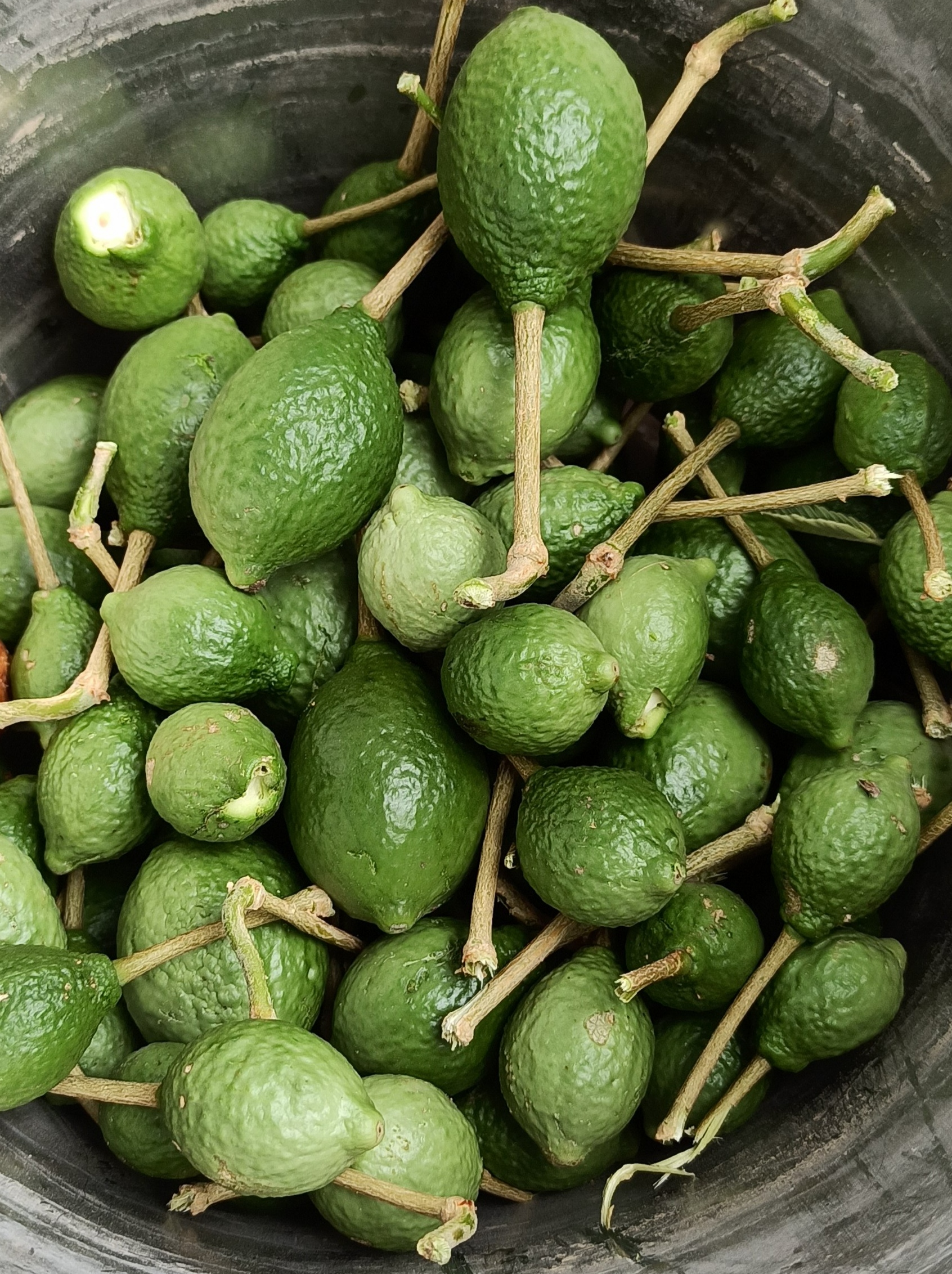

Capparis zeylanica is a climbing shrub common in the forests of the Indian subcontinent, Indo-China, China and Malesia; no subspecies are listed in the Catalogue of Life. Several species of Lepidopteran larvae feed on its leaves.

== Gallery ==
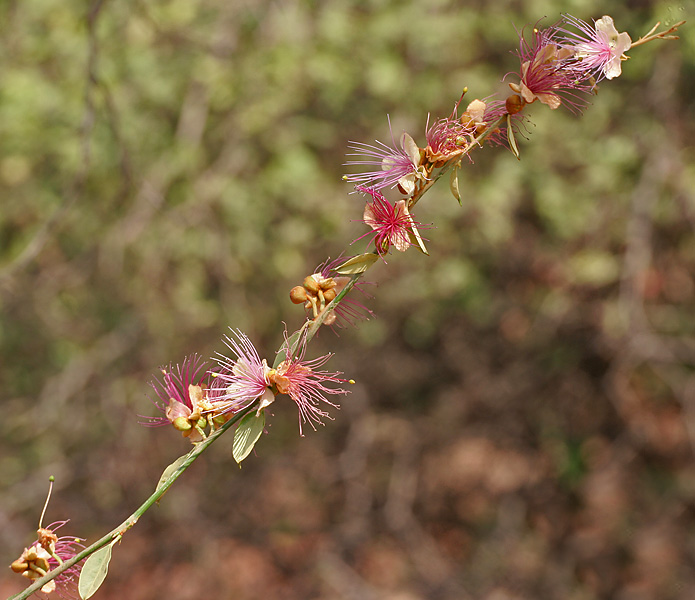

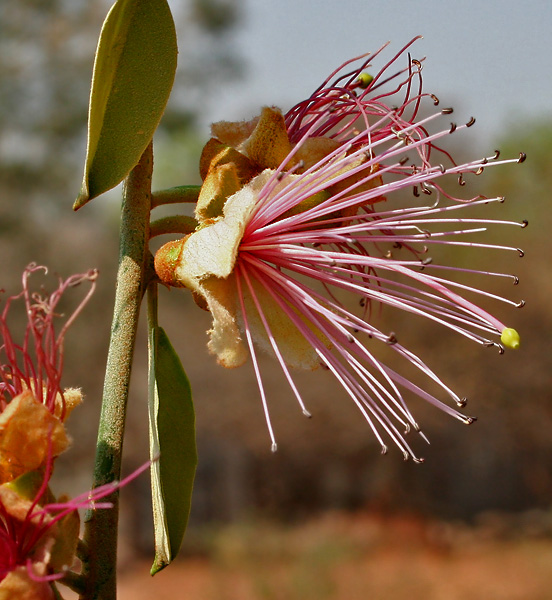

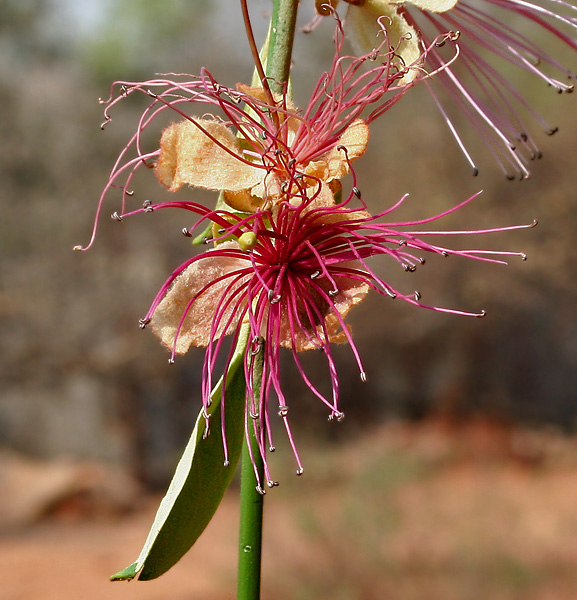

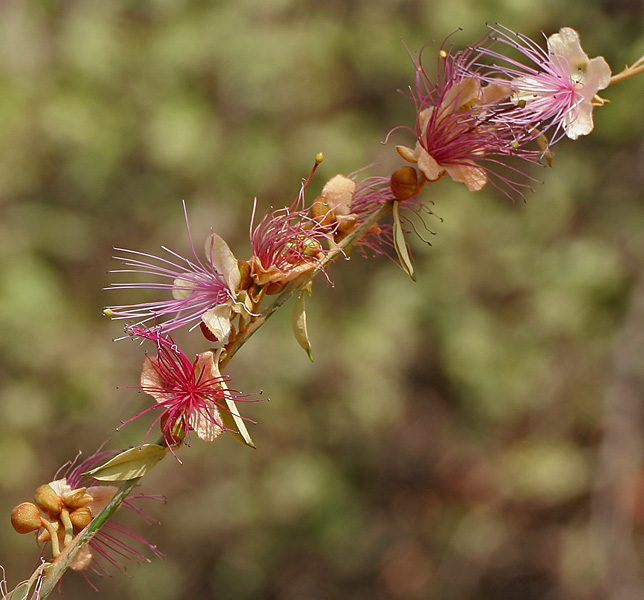

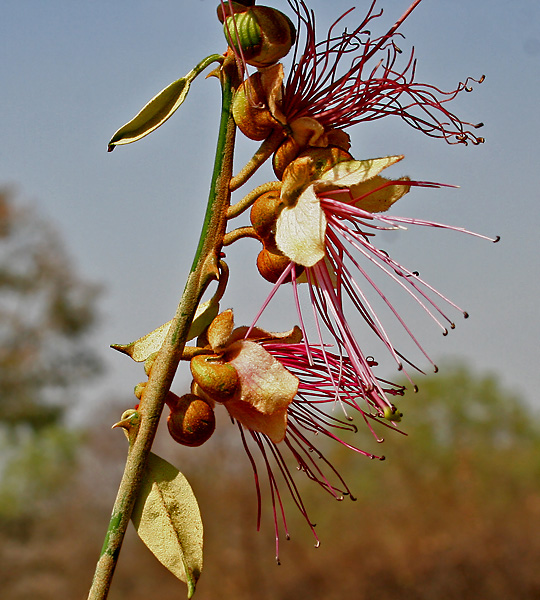

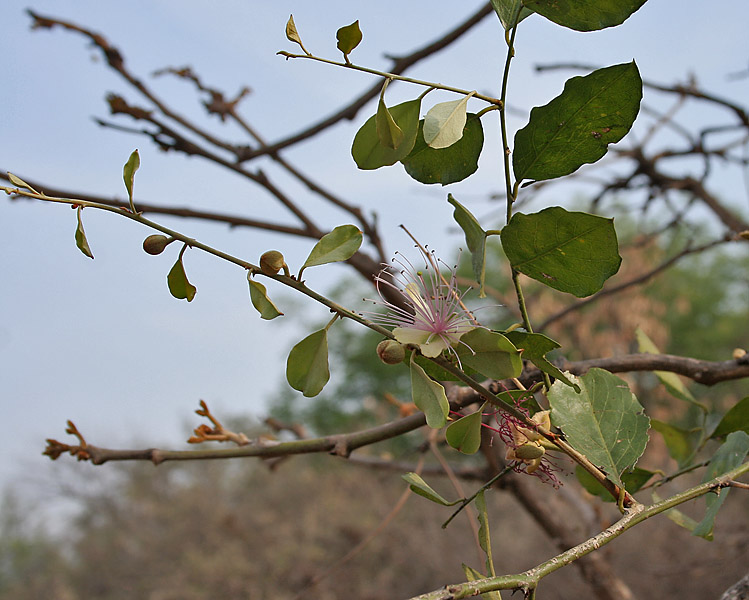
