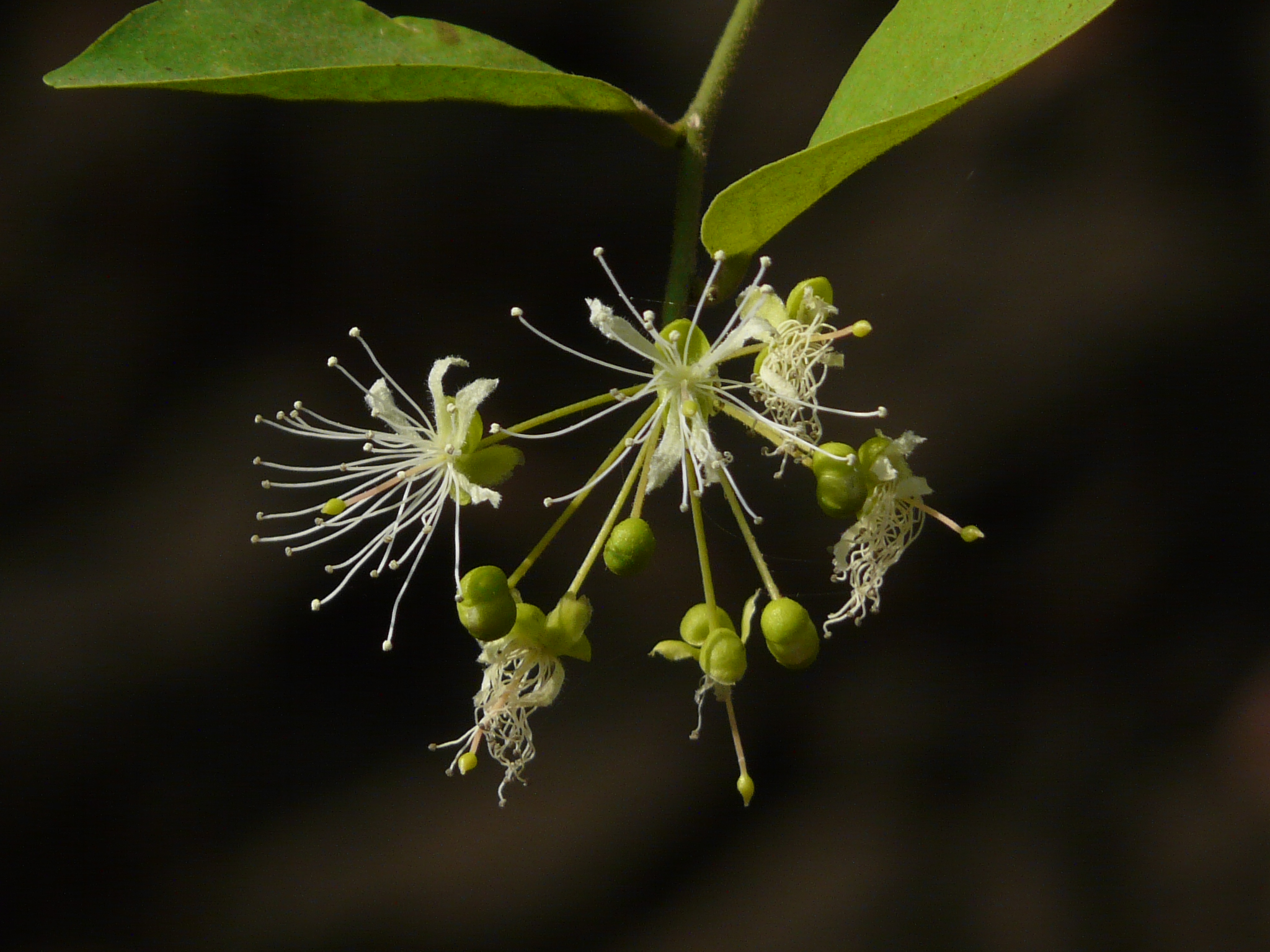

Scientific classification
- Kingdom: Plantae
- Clade: Tracheophytes
- Clade: Angiosperms
- Clade: Eudicots
- Clade: Rosids
- Order: Brassicales
- Family: Capparaceae
- Genus: Capparis
- Species: C. sepiaria

Binomial name
- Capparis sepiaria L.

= Capparis sepiaria =

Species of plant

Capparis sepiaria, also commonly called hedge caper or wild caper bush, is a shrub that has a pantropical distribution, especially in dry deciduous forests, foothills and scrub jungles.

== Description ==
Capparis sepiaria is a prickly, evergreen shrub growing to 3 to 5 meters tall, with white flowers during season. It flowers from February onwards, and fruits start developing in April.

== Distribution and habitat ==
Capparis sepiaria has a pantropical distribution, and has been found in Africa, Sri Lanka, Myanmar, India, Australia. In India, it has been observed in Kolhapur, Chikmagalur, Dharwad, Mysore, Shimoga, Hyderabad and various areas of Kerala and Tamil Nadu, including the Nilgiri Mountains in the Western Ghats, where the locals, like the Irulas, are familiar with it for various traditional medicinal uses.

== Ecological significance ==
In the areas where Capparis sepiaria grows in Rajasthan, it appears to be an important source of fodder for local wildlife, like the chital, sambar, and nilgai, who like to eat the shoots.

Like many members of the Capparis genus, various parts of the plant, especially the flowers and fruit, are used as food or traditional medicine. The flowers are pollinated by bees and the tree bark is an important larval host plant for the great orange-tipped butterfly and yellow orange tip butterfly of South India.
