= Thanksgiving in Portland, Oregon =

Holiday celebrations in the United States

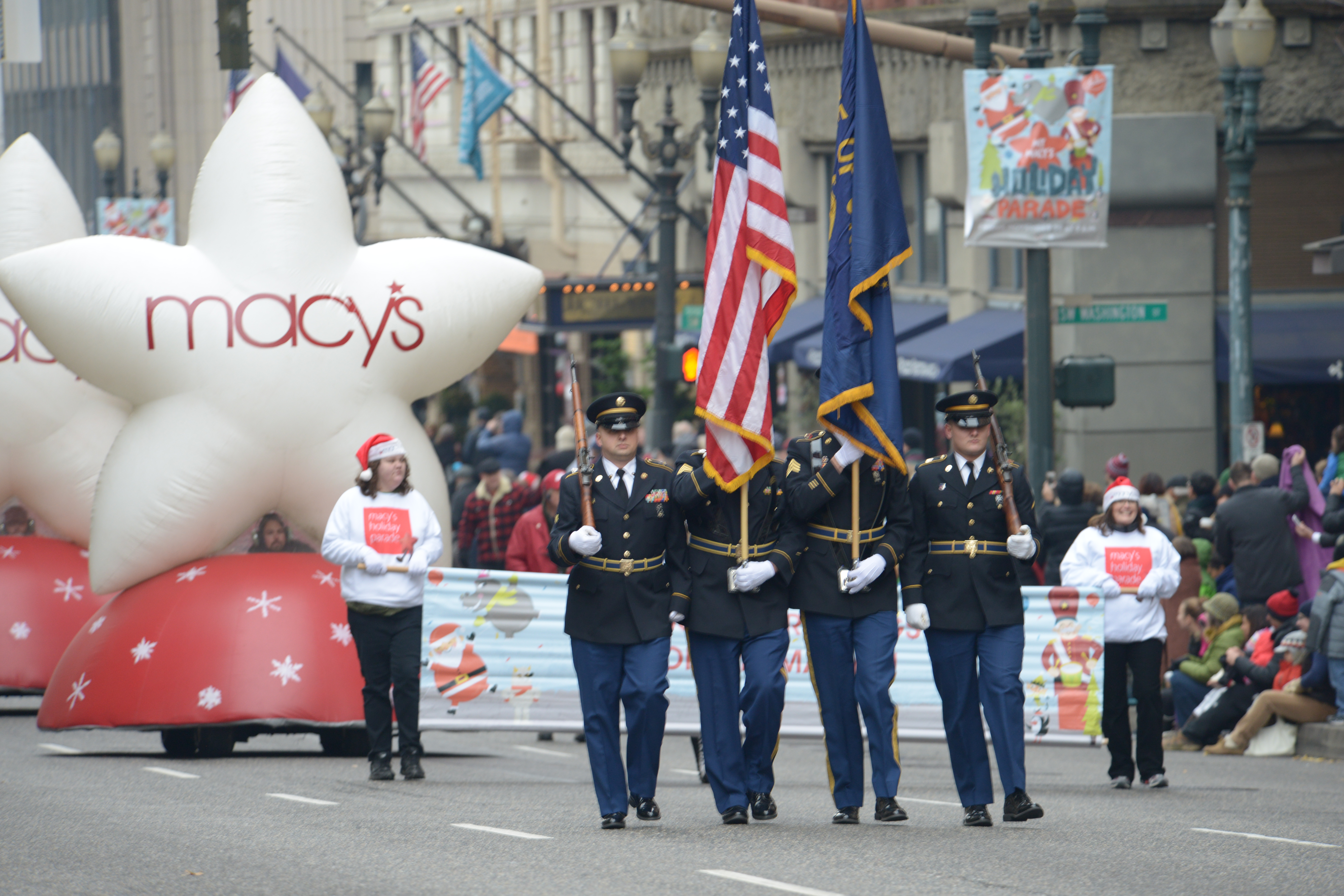
Oregon National Guard's Adjutant General Select Honor Guard team leading the Macy's Thanksgiving Day Parade in downtown Portland, Oregon, in 2013

The American federal holiday Thanksgiving is celebrated annually in the city of Portland, Oregon. A parade was held from 1987 to 2016, initially created by Meier & Frank and later sponsored by Macy's. The city has multiple annual turkey trots, including one at the Portland International Raceway, another at the Oregon Zoo and International Rose Test Garden, and one sponsored by Tofurkey that has entrants travel from Oaks Amusement Park to the Sellwood Bridge and back. The city has also hosted football games on Thanksgiving. Other activities help launch the Christmas shopping season, such as turkey bowling at Lloyd Center for Black Friday, Small Business Saturday, and other initiatives to support small businesses.

Restaurants have served special Thanksgiving meals for indoor dining or take-out; some have offered free meals. Several groups and organizations such as Portland Rescue Mission, Sunshine Division, and Union Gospel Mission provide Thanksgiving meals to people annually. Local public transport is impacted by the holiday and Portland International Airport sees traffic spikes. City offices and most branches of Multnomah County Library are closed on Thanksgiving.

== Events and activities ==
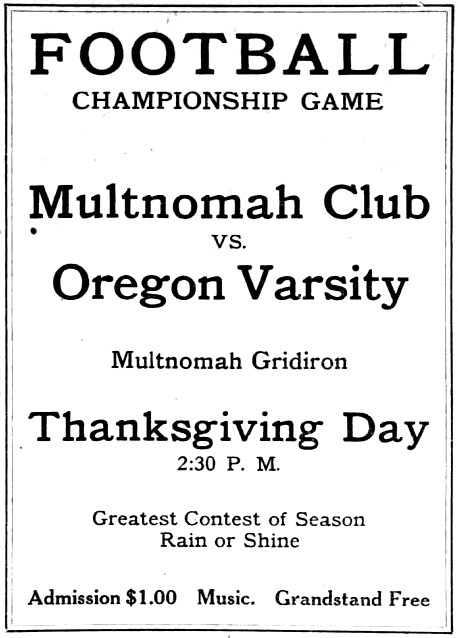
An advertisement from The Oregonian in 1906 for a game between the Multnomah Athletic Club and University of Oregon football teams at Multnomah Field in Portland, Oregon. The game was an annual Thanksgiving match-up.

Some residents play American football on Thanksgiving. Historically, the Multnomah Athletic Club football and University of Oregon football teams played at Multnomah Field. The football from the 1904 game is part of the collection of the Oregon Historical Society.

In 2012 and 2016, the Lloyd Center hosted turkey bowling on the shopping mall's ice rink to celebrate Black Friday, the day after Thanksgiving that traditionally marks the start of the Christmas shopping season. The city has seen other small business initiatives around the holiday, such as Small Business Saturday in 2025.

=== Parade ===
Portland hosted an annual parade on Thanksgiving for 29 years, from 1987 to 2016. The parade was started by Meier & Frank and known as the Meier & Frank Holiday Parade; some locals called the tradition "the Christmas parade" because it featured Santa Claus. After Meier & Frank was acquired by Macy's, the parade was known as the Macy's Thanksgiving Day Parade or Macy's Holiday Parade. The parade stopped after the Macy's store in downtown Portland closed in 2017. In 2016, KGW said the parade had 25 inflatable floats, marching bands from local middle and high schools, community drill teams, and approximately 650 costumed characters. Inflatables included an elf, a polar bear, and a snowman. Grant Butler of The Oregonian said the final parade had "Victorian carolers, caterpillar and polar bear floats, and plenty of marching bands". He wrote, "As if on cue, it started snowing just as the parade wrapped up. Santa couldn't have asked for a bigger finish." Footage of some of the parades are available on YouTube, according to the newspaper.

=== Turkey trots ===
Turkey trots are organized annually in Portland. Established in 2015, the PIR Turkey Trot is an annual fun run at Portland International Raceway, held on the night before Thanksgiving. The event has multiple races and also serves as a preview of the Winter Wonderland light show. In 2025, Brianna Wheeler of the Willamette Week opined, "If Thanksgiving as a concept bums you out, this is a great moment symbolically to run away while simultaneously making new running buddies."

The Oregon Road Runners Club and Oregon Zoo also host an annual Turkey Trot; races include a 5K run, as well as the Gobble Gallup and Tot Trot, both of which are for children. Participants go through the zoo and the International Rose Test Garden, and costumes are encouraged. Thousands of people participated in the zoo's Turkey Trot in 2025; entrants received a knit cap and a chocolate turkey.

Tofurky sponsors its race, the Tofurky Trot, annually. The event benefits the organization Northwest VEG and includes a 5K, a costume contest, and vegan snacks. Participants start near the Oaks Park Roller Skating Rink at Oaks Amusement Park, then take the Springwater Corridor to cross the Sellwood Bridge, before returning to the park. In 2019, Maura Fox included the Tofurky Trot in Outside magazine's "unofficial guide to America's best Turkey Trots".

== Food ==
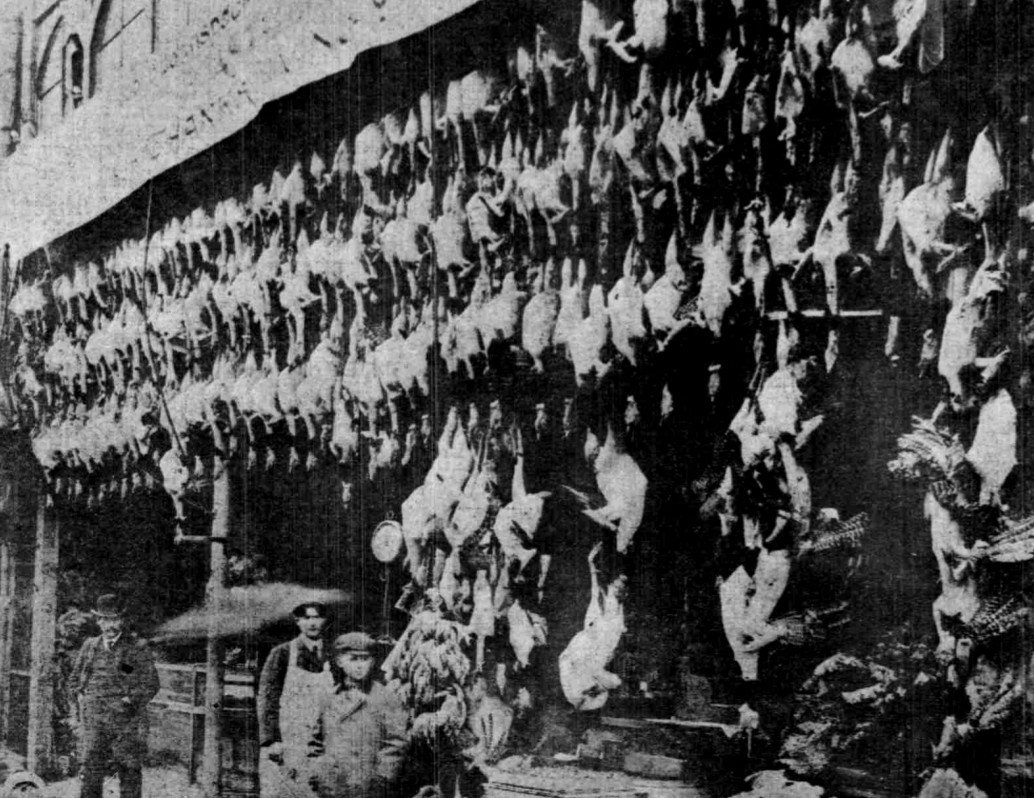
Market in Portland, Oregon in 1905, with an abundance of turkeys in anticipation for Thanksgiving

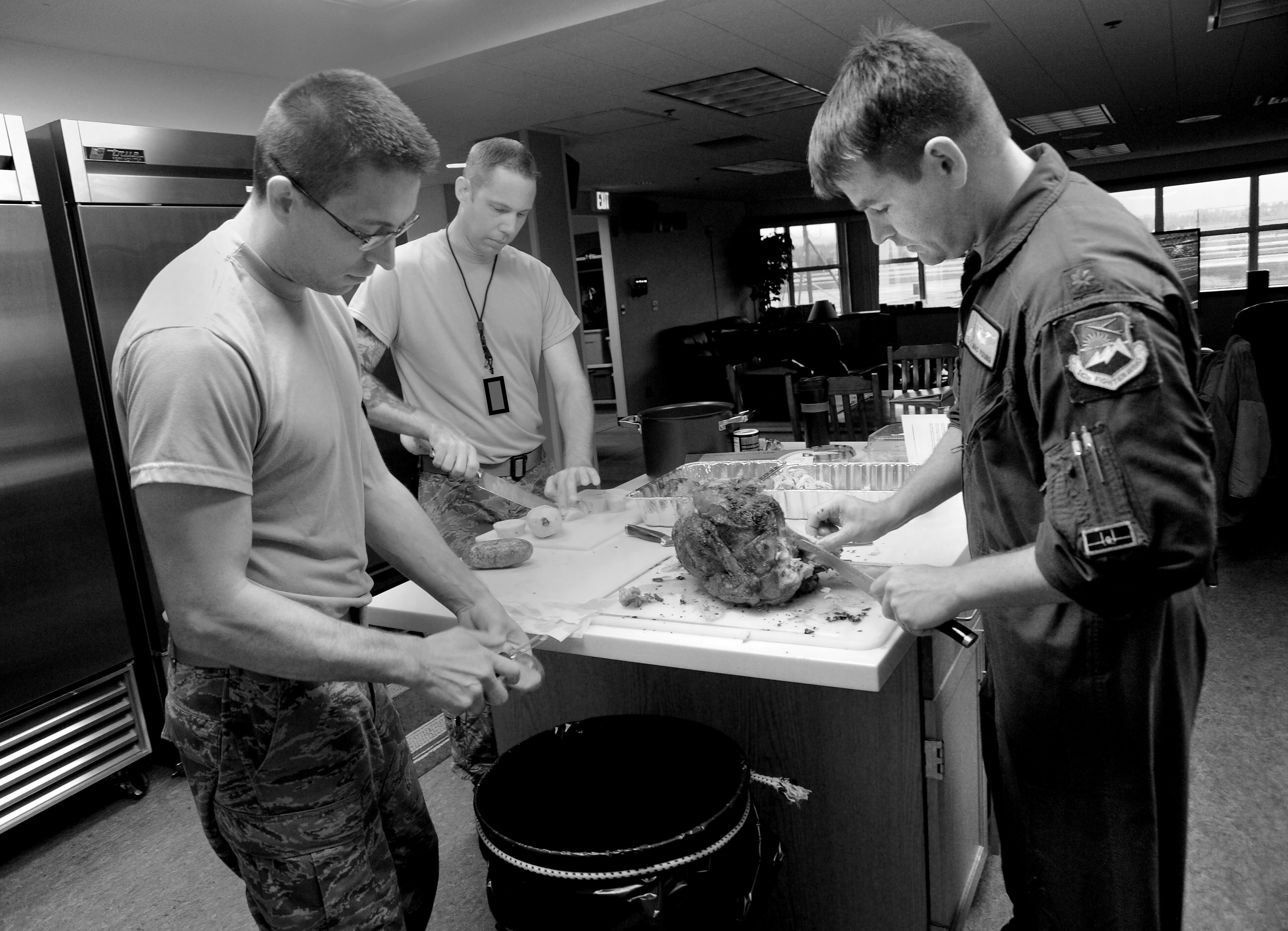
Food being prepared on Thanksgiving at Portland Air National Guard Base, Portland International Airport, 2014

Many restaurants have offered specials for Thanksgiving, including Andina, Bark City BBQ, Brix Tavern, Campana, Clarklewis, Duck House Chinese Restaurant, Friendship Kitchen, Huber's, Jake's Famous Crawfish, Jake's Grill, Jojo, Kann, Mother's Bistro, Papa Haydn, RingSide Steakhouse, Screen Door, and Sweedeedee in 2025. Cheryl's on 12th, Portland City Grill, the defunct Quaintrelle, the restaurant at the Ritz-Carlton, Salt & Straw, and Ya Hala have also offered specials for Thanksgiving. Some restaurants and grocery stores have offered take-out specials for the holiday, including Ava Gene's, Bullard Tavern, the defunct De Noche, Elephants Delicatessen, Laurelhurst Market, Magna Kusina, Urban Farmer, and Zupan's Markets in 2023. In 2023, Brooke Jackson-Glidden of Eater Portland recommended Clarklewis, Elephants, and Urban Farmer for vegan options. Other restaurants have offered free meals, including Mémoire Cà Phê, Prost, and Sun Rice. The seventeenth annual "Prostgiving" in 2025 featured a dinner buffet with traditional Thanksgiving foods such as turkey, stuffing, and mashed potatoes.

Various organizations have offered free Thanksgiving meals, including Portland Rescue Mission and Union Gospel Mission. Union Gospel Mission planned to serve approximately 450 meals in 2025. A division of The Salvation Army has hosted Thanksgiving dinner at the Moore Street Corps Community Center in north Portland for a decade; the 2021 event served 170 and organizers planned to feed 300 people in 2022. In 2025, between 500 and 1,000 volunteers with the Sunshine Division delivered approximately 2,750 Thanksgiving meals in Portland and Gresham. Approximately 50 employees of Zupan's Markets helped assemble the food boxes in 2025, as part of the company's almost two-decade partnership with the Sunshine Division. In 2025, the Sexual and Gender Minority Youth Resource Center hosted "Queersgiving" for LGBTQ youth. The Celebration Tabernacle Church in north Portland has hosted Proper Thanksgiving Feast-ival and the Mt. Scott Community Center and Pool in southeast Portland has hosted Feast for Southeast.

== Public transport and travel ==
There can be changes to schedules on public transport around the holiday; for example, TriMet's bus, MAX Light Rail, and streetcar operations have followed a weekend schedule on Thanksgiving, and the Portland Aerial Tram and WES Commuter Rail services have stopped service for the holiday. With some exceptions, parking meters were not enforced on Thanksgiving in 2025. Portland International Airport sees increased traffic around Thanksgiving. In 2010, approximately 290,000 passengers were expected to use the airport during Thanksgiving week, including between 34,000 and 43,000 per day on November 24, 28, and 29. In 2020, during the COVID-19 pandemic, approximately 200,000 people were expected to use the airport during Thanksgiving weekend. In 2025, approximately 367,000 travelers were expected to visit the airport between November 25 and December 1, with 60,000 alone on the Sunday and Monday after Thanksgiving. There can be longer driving times to reach Eugene via Interstate 5 around the holiday.

== See also ==
- Culture of Portland, Oregon
