= Post Alley Pizza =

Pizzeria in Seattle, Washington, U.S.

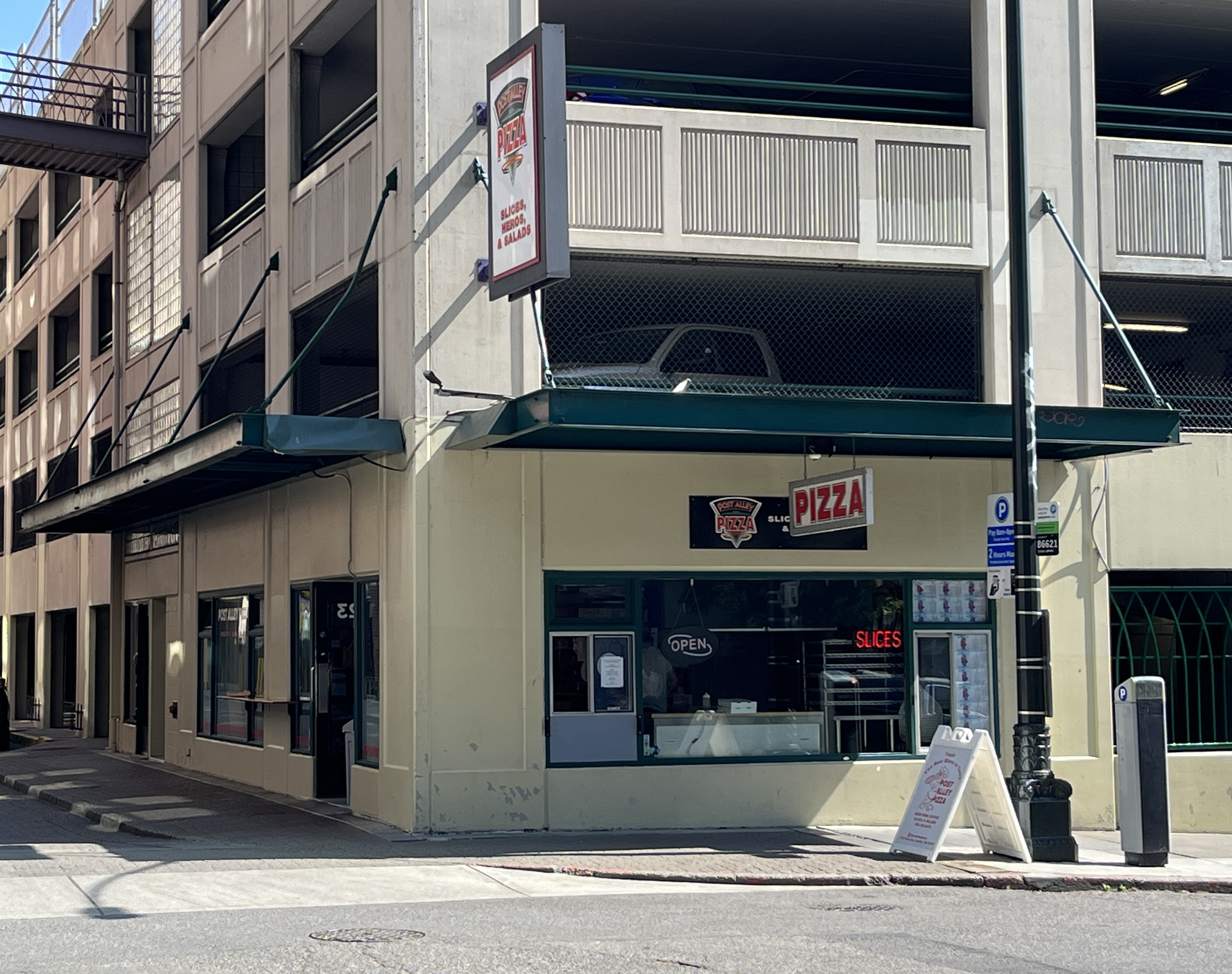
- The restaurant's exterior in 2023
- Interactive map of Post Alley Pizza

Restaurant information
- Established: 1997
- Owners: Marc Russell; Andrew and Ruel Gregory; Yasuaki Saito
- Previous owners: Doug Murray; Joshua Huckaby
- Food type: Italian
- Location: 1123 Post Avenue, Seattle, King, Washington, 98101, United States
- Coordinates: 47.6057°N 122.3381°W
- Website: postalley.pizza

Post Alley Pizza is a pizzeria in Seattle, in the U.S. state of Washington. The business was established by chef Doug Murray in 1997. He sold the business in 1999; since then, Post Alley Pizza has been owned by Joshua Huckaby, Marc Russell, spouses Andrew and Ruel Gregory, and Yasuaki Saito. The restaurant has garnered a positive reception for its New York–style pizza and sandwiches.

== Description ==
Post Alley Pizza is a pizzeria in the back of a parking garage at the intersection of Post Avenue and Seneca Street in the Central Waterfront district, approximately three blocks south from the Pike Place Market in downtown Seattle. Midland Reporter-Telegram's Evan Winston has described the restaurant as a "small hole-in-the-wall joint". The interior has Phish posters. Seattle Weekly has said of the clientele and staff:

Business suits and overalls share equal time here: 9-to-5ers from every demographic can be found hunkering down over a piece of honest-to-goodness New York-style street pizza, thin-crusted and bedecked with vegetables and meats of uncommon freshness. Moreover, the men and women who make the pies and ring up your order have an understated air of friendliness about them.

=== Menu ===
Post Alley serves New York–style pizza. As of 2022, ten varieties of pizza are sold by the slice or as 16- or 18-inch pies. Varieties include pepperoni, as well as sausage with pistachio pesto with honey. Dipping sauces include a homemade ranch and calabrian chili buffalo sauce.

The menu has also included breakfast sandwiches made with English muffins; varieties include: bacon, egg and cheese (or B.E.C.); sausage; vegetarian; and one with bacon, cashew butter, roasted delicata squash, and honey. Other ingredients for Italian sandwiches have included sesame hoagie rolls, finocchiona salami, spicy coppa, ham, provolone, red onion, and coleslaw. "Hoagie jazz”, an anchovy spread with calabrian chiles and garlic, has been served on the side.

== History ==
=== Ownership and operations ===
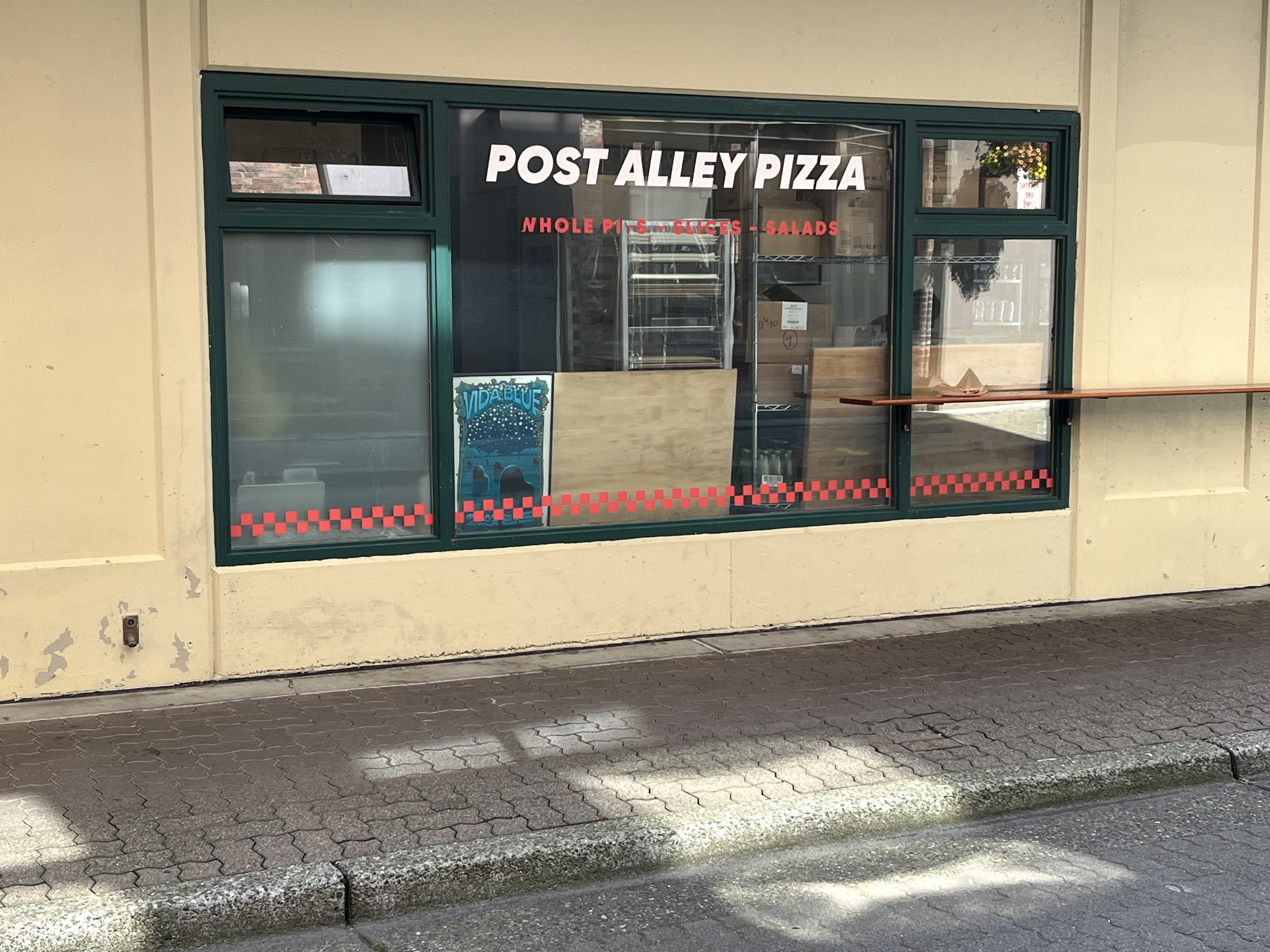
Post Avenue exterior, 2023

Post Alley was founded by chef Doug Murray in 1997. Originally from New York City, Murray arrived in Seattle earlier in the decade to work for Duke's. He sold the restaurant in 1999 and became the head chef of the Experience Music Project's in-museum restaurant.

Joshua Huckaby was described as a former owner in 2013. Marc Russell owned the business for three years, as of 2015. As of 2022, co-owners include spouses Andrew and Ruel Gregory, and Yasuaki Saito. Andrew Gregory was named one of seven "rising stars" of the industry by Pizza Today in 2022. He told the publication, "Our small shop and corner of Seattle has been under construction since the day we took ownership four years ago. It has been confusing for everyone." On the topics of inflation and rising costs, he said:

Our commitment to local food products and vendors has helped insulate our costs to some degree. We've explored offering breakfast sandwiches with some success. We did raise our prices. But we have also leaned into our 'alley' location and focused on takeout. We installed a take-out window and reduced our dining room to only a few barstools.

Andrew Gregory and Saito use Post Alley's dough recipe at Tivoli, which opened in Fremont in 2023 and also offers pizza and sandwiches. In November 2023, Post Alley's sandwich offerings went on an "indefinite hiatus" because of capacity issues related to space and staffing.

=== Collaborations and community activities ===
In 2020, Post Alley was among fifteen restaurants in Seattle and Portland that served fried-chicken specials to raise funds for the family of Cameron Addy, a chef who worked at Ava Gene's, Papa Haydn, St. Jack, and other restaurants, before he died of a heart attack. Post Alley collaborated with Ben's Bread Co. on a French bread pizza in 2021. The two businesses co-hosted a French-bread-pizza pop-up at the defunct restaurant The London Plane (2014–2022), where Saito was also a co-owner. Post Alley was among sixty Seattle metropolitan area establishments that raised funds for victims of the 2023 Turkey–Syria earthquakes.

== Reception ==
=== Newspapers and magazines ===
In 1998, Timothy Egan of The New York Times said, "street pizza in Seattle, New York style, is not an oxymoron" at Post Alley. The business was named the "best pizza hideaway" in Seattle Weekly's 2006 "best bites" overview. The newspaper said Post Alley "remains the industry standard for food, service, and ambiance. It is the one place on earth where the special is legitimately 'special.' With a different one each day... these things are so good that you don't even have to know what the day's special is before ordering it; the only trick is to get there before they run out". A writer for Seattle Weekly opined in 2006: "Post Alley wears its back-to-basics style like a fine tuxedo, and at a time when Domino's and Pizza Hut can make a pie enthusiast weep, the little parlor at Post and Seneca is just enough of a good thing." In the newspaper's 2018 list of the ten best "Seattle bites" under $10, Seth Sommerfeld wrote:

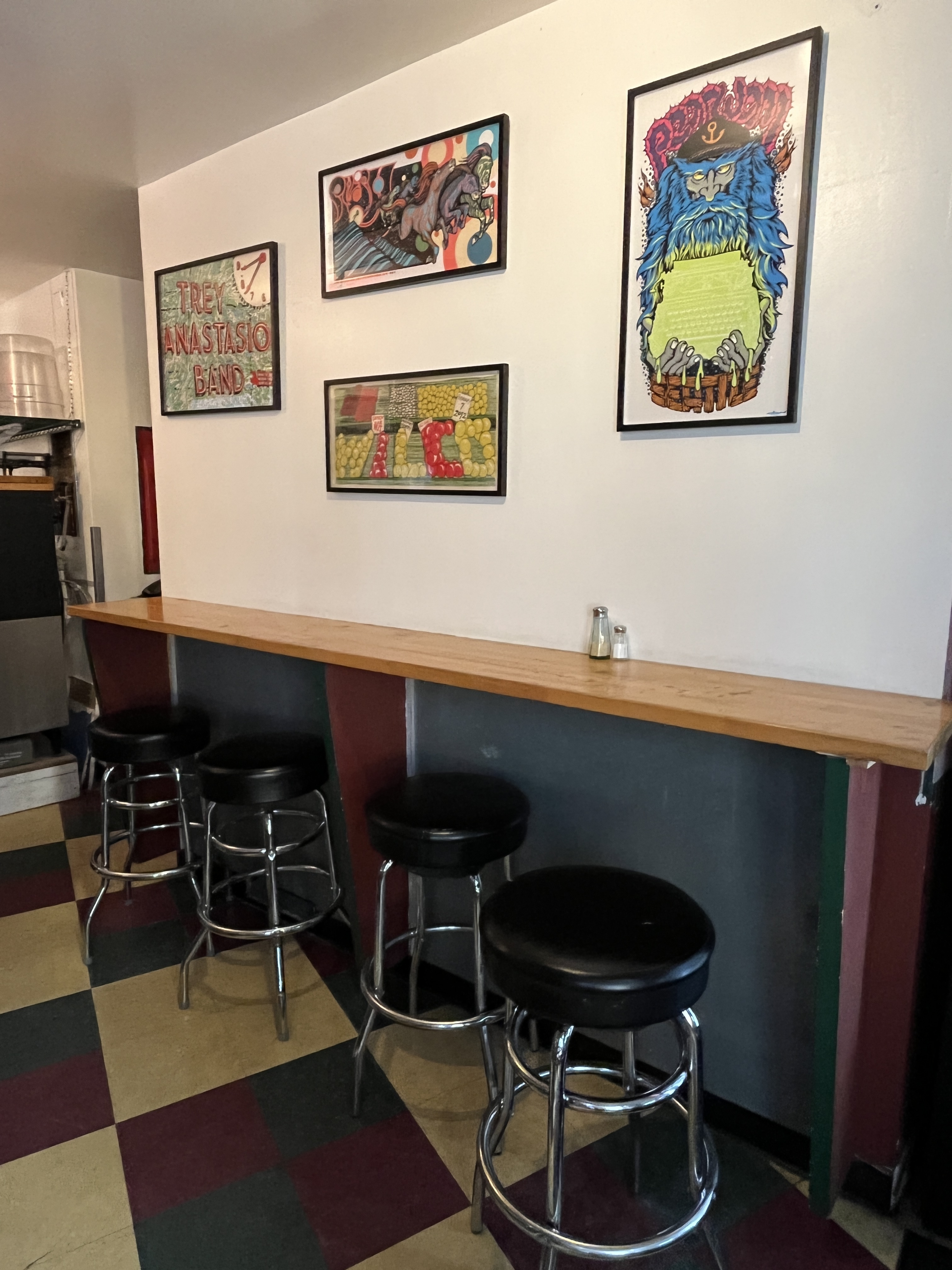
The pizzeria's interior, 2022

While Seattle may not be a mecca of by-the-slice pizza, Post Alley Pizza is well worth the trek to its tucked-away nook in the Central Business District. While you can't go wrong with the New York-style basics, including a near-perfect sauce/cheese ratio and crisp crust, the array of unpredictable daily specials make Post Alley stand apart from its peers. Any day might feature BBQ chicken pizza, bacon and potato slices, a pepperoni, onion, and jalapeno combo, some overloaded veggie creation, or basically whatever suits the chef's current mood.

Jake Uitti ranked Post Alley seventh place in The Stranger's 2018 "pizza pie face off", a search for Seattle's best slice. In 2019, Evan Winston of the Midland Reporter-Telegram said the pizza "was well worth the wait". In 2020, Jackie Varriano included the business in The Seattle Times' list of four "great spots" in the metropolitan area for a "scrumptious" breakfast sandwich . Allecia Vermillion included the restaurant in Seattle Metropolitan's 2022 list of thirteen "exceptional" breakfast sandwiches. She also selected Post Alley for the Central Waterfront in a 2022 overview of the city's best pizza by neighborhood and wrote: "A decades-old slice shop tucked behind a parking garage recently acquired serious culinary bona fides—and new owners with connections to London Plane. Post Alley didn't get fancier, exactly, but now local grains power a crust that could hold its own in the sort of restaurant with wine lists and a bread program." Portland Monthly called the pizzeria a "star newcomer" in 2023. The New York Times included Post Alley in a 2024 list of the 25 best restaurants in Seattle.

=== Review websites and food writers ===
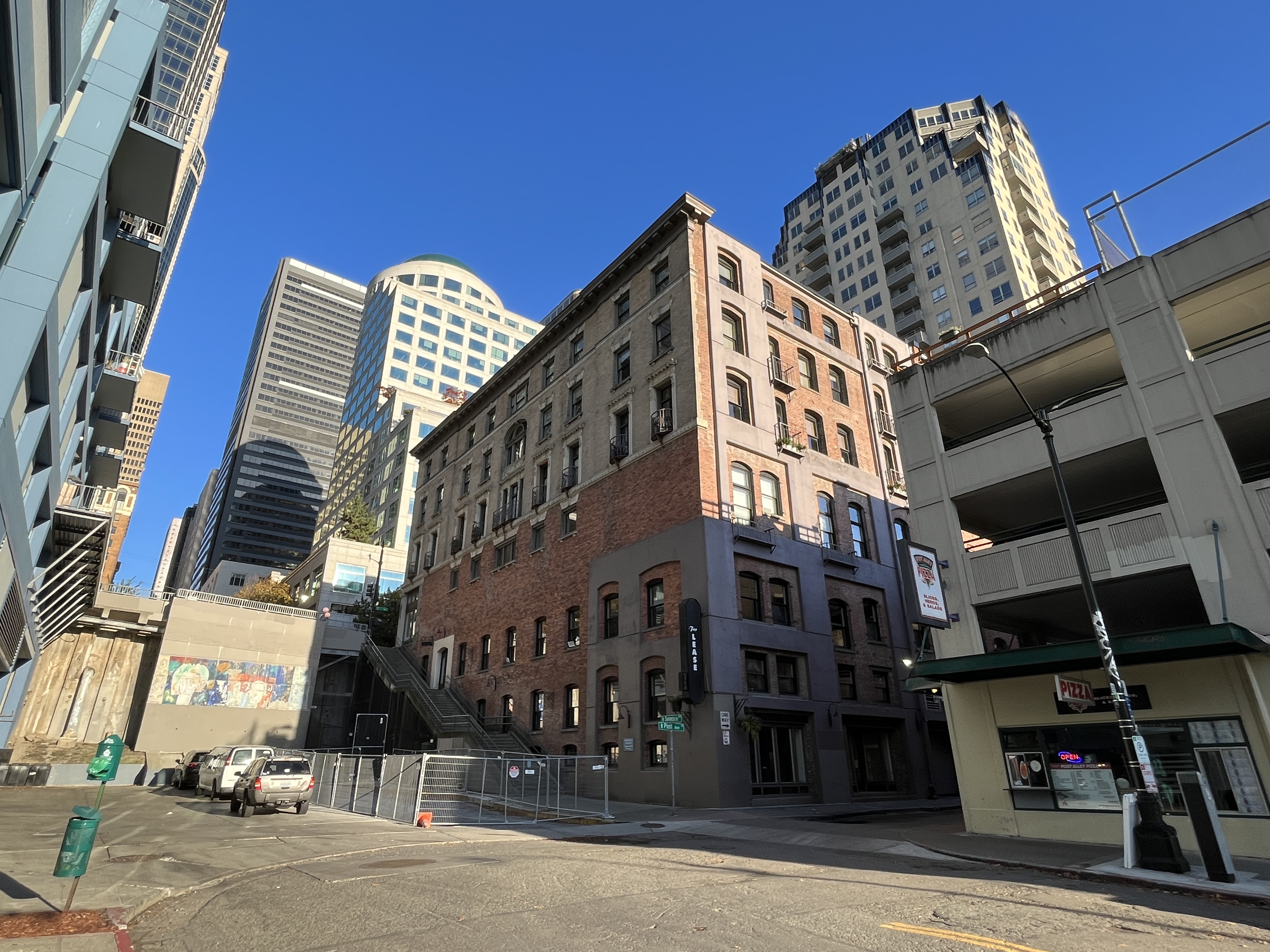
The pizzeria (on right) and parking garage at the intersection of Post Avenue and Seneca Street, 2022

Post Alley was included in Eater Seattle's 2021 overview of the city's best breakfast sandwiches. In 2022–2023, the website's Jade Yamazaki Stewart included the business in an overview of Seattle's "exceptional" pizza, as well as lists of "great" restaurants near Pike Place Market. In a 2023 list of fourteen establishments serving "perfect" pizza, Stewart and Meg van Huygen wrote, "This low-lit pizza den near the gum wall is easy to overlook... But after a recent menu revamp and ownership change, with improved doughs and higher quality ingredients has made this low-key Seattle standby one of the best pizzerias in town." Eater Seattle's Sophie Grossman said Post Alley has "perfect specimens of the East Coast slice variety" in 2023.

Aimee Rizzo included Post Alley in The Infatuation's list of ten "great" meals in Seattle for $10. She and Kayla Sager-Riley included the Italian sandwiches in 2022 and 2024 lists of the city's best sandwiches when boating. She included Post Alley in overviews of Seattle's best lunch and pizza options, opining:

This spot works really well if you're downtown and in need of a quick lunch slice you can trust, or you need a few reliable New York-style pies for a birthday party. Be sure to add sides of ranch and homemade calabrian chili buffalo sauce for dunking, and what's even more exciting is that this place offers granulated garlic to shake on your slice—a necessity that we haven't been able to find at any other pizza place in town.

Post Alley was also included in The Infatuation's 2023 list of chef and food writer J. Kenji López-Alt's recommendations for lunch in Seattle under $10. López-Alt complimented the pizza and the Italian sandwich. He also included the restaurant in his 2024 "Let's Eat Seattle Guide", in which he said Post Alley "makes quite possibly the best slices in town".
