= Campana (restaurant) =

Italian restaurant in Portland, Oregon, U.S.

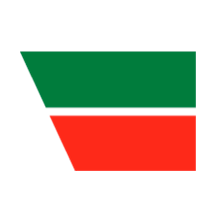
- Interactive map of Campana

Restaurant information
- Food type: Italian
- Location: 901 Northeast Oneonta Street, Portland, Multnomah, Oregon, 97211, United States
- Coordinates: 45.5720°N 122.6568°W
- Website: campanapdx.com

Campana is an Italian restaurant in Portland, Oregon's Woodlawn neighborhood, in the United States. Chef-owner George Kaden and co-owner Annalisa Maceda started Campana in 2018, initially as a series of pasta nights that became a pop-up restaurant at Grand Army Tavern, which the duo opened together in 2017. Plans for Campana to take over the Grand Army Tavern space were exacerbated by the arrival of the COVID-19 pandemic in 2020.

Campana's menu includes cacciatore, comfort food such as spaghetti and meatballs, cavatelli in pork ragu, polenta, puttanesca, panna cotta, and other Italian dishes. The restaurant has hosted special dinners for holidays like Feast of the Seven Fishes and Thanksgiving, and has garnered a positive reception.

== Description ==
The Italian restaurant Campana operates in northeast Portland's Woodlawn neighborhood. Eater Portland has described the space as "bright" and "industrial", and Portland Monthly has called the mood "part New Jersey food DNA, part New York fine dining". The menu has appetizers (including meatballs and olives), salads, pastas, risotto, and chicken cacciatore, as well as desserts such as chocolate panna cotta and olive oil cake with whipped cream. The restaurant has also served cannolis, garlic bread, and comfort food such as spaghetti and meatballs, cavatelli in pork ragu, and rigatoni with braised pork ribs and polenta. Drink options include Aperol spritzes and Negronis. The happy hour menu has included pasta with arrabbiata sauce, puttanesca, and Italian wine.

== History ==
Campana started as pasta nights in 2018 and became a pop-up restaurant at Grand Army Tavern. George Kaden was the chef of both businesses. Campana initially served three-course pasta dinners.

In June 2020, Kaden and co-owner Annalisa Maceda closed Grand Army Tavern (established in 2017) and expanded Campana to take over the space in its entirety. According to The Oregonian, "Shifting to Campana full-time was already in the works before Oregon's COVID-19 outbreak, but the pandemic did force the timing."

In 2022, Campana hosted a seafood-focused five-course tasting menu for the Italian-American Christmas Eve celebration Feast of the Seven Fishes. For Thanksgiving in 2023, the restaurant had a four-course meal with: chicory salad with citrus vinaigrette and hazelnuts, white bean soup with autumn vegetables and Parmigiano; turkey with gravy, cranberry sauce, chestnut stuffing, honey-glazed squash, carrots, and potatoes; and a pear crostata with pumpkin spice gelato.

In 2026, business participated in Portland Dining Month as well as Strawberry Shortcake Week, which was presented by and in support of the James Beard Public Market.

== Reception ==
In 2020, Alex Frane of Eater Portland said Campana "can be easily missed by those in other parts of the city, but it's well worth the trek". Nathan Williams and Krista Garcia included the business in a 2023 list of thirteen "solid" restaurants in the city for dining solo. In 2024, the website included Campana in an overview of the city's "stellar" Italian restaurants and food carts, and Asia Alvarez and Brooke Jackson-Glidden included the business in a list of "foolproof first date spots for every kind of Portlander". Jackson-Glidden and Rebecca Roland also included Campana in Eater Portland's 2024 list of restaurants in the city with "beautiful" private dining rooms. Campana was also in the website's 2025 list of Portland's best Italian restaurants.

Portland Monthly included Campana in a 2024 overview of the city's 50 best restaurants and said the eatery "has quietly morphed into a must-know Italian restaurant, warm and thoughtful to the bone." The magazine also said the scarpariello "vies for Portland's chicken crown", as well as: "Good cocktails, a Godfather-level cannoli, and attentive service seal the deal, as jazz tootles overhead." Campana ranked first in the best pasta restaurants category of The Oregonian's annual readers choice awards in 2024. Michael Russell ranked the business number 21 in the newspaper's 2025 list of Portland's 40 best restaurants.

== See also ==
- List of Italian restaurants
