= Petunia's Pies & Pastries =

Bakery and dessert shop in Portland, Oregon, U.S.

- The shop's exterior, 2026
- Interactive map of Petunia's Pies & Pastries

Restaurant information
- Owners: Lisa Clark; Jacob Williamson
- Location: 610 Southwest 12th Avenue, Portland, Multnomah, Oregon, 97205, United States
- Coordinates: 45.5209°N 122.6837°W
- Seating capacity: 25

Petunia's Pies & Pastries is a bakery and dessert shop in Portland, Oregon, United States. The business specializes in gluten-free and vegan pastries.

== Description ==
The bakery and dessert shop Petunia's Pies & Pastries operates near the intersection of Alder Street and 12th Avenue in downtown Portland. The interior has exposed brick walls, white countertops, and wood beams.

The shop specializes in gluten-free and vegan pastries such as bumble-berry peach pie, streusels with coconut and hazelnut, cupcakes, coffee cake, doughnuts, muffins, coconut passionberry babycakes, cookies, marionberry crumble bars, and macarons. The menu has also included burgers, pizza, salads, soups, chili, and cornbread. Chili ingredients include pinto and black beans, corn, kale, tomato, cayenne pepper, paprika, and chili powder. Petunia's also offers ice cream and waffle cones.

Among cocktails is the Widow's Kiss, which has apple brandy, chartreuse, Benedictine, and bitters. The shop also offers seasonal options such as peppermint hot cocoa babycakes with toasted marshmallows, eggnog cheesecake with a ginger snap crust, chocolate mint sandwich cookies with a peppermint buttercream filling, pumpkin maple spice cake with maple buttercream and candied ginger, and sugar cookies. Petunia's has also sold chocolate brownies, sticky buns with pecans, and blueberry-lemon scones. Pie varieties have included apple crumb, marionberry crumb, pecan, and pumpkin.

== History ==
Lisa Clark opened the 25-seat shop as Portland's first gluten-free and vegan bakery on March 1, 2013. She operates the business with her husband Jacob Williamson. Prior to opening a brick and mortar storefront, she sold gluten-free and vegan products at farmers' markets and other events. The shop launched a savory lunch menu in 2014.

Elephants Delicatessen, New Seasons Market, and Whole Foods Market have sold products by Petunia's. In 2020, during the COVID-19 pandemic, the business operated via curbside pickup and delivery via Grubhub and Postmates at times. Petunia's also sold baking mixes, gift cards, and merchandise.

== Reception ==
Michelle Lopez included the business in Eater Portland's 2024 overview of the city's best pies. The website's Sararosa Davies included Petunia's in a 2025 list of Porltand's best gluten-free bakeries and restaurants. Anastasia Sloan included the shop in Eater Portland's 2025 overview of the city's best dairy-free frozen desserts.

== See also ==
- List of bakeries
- List of vegetarian and vegan restaurants
