= Streptomyces capparidis =

Scientific classification
- Domain: Bacteria
- Kingdom: Bacillati
- Phylum: Actinomycetota
- Class: Actinomycetia
- Order: Streptomycetales
- Family: Streptomycetaceae
- Genus: Streptomyces
- Species: S. capparidis

Binomial name
- Streptomyces capparidis Wang et al. 2017

Species of bacterium

Streptomyces capparidis is a bacterium species from the genus of Streptomyces which has been isolated from the fruits of the caper bush Capparis spinosa in Urumqi in China.

== See also ==
- List of Streptomyces species
