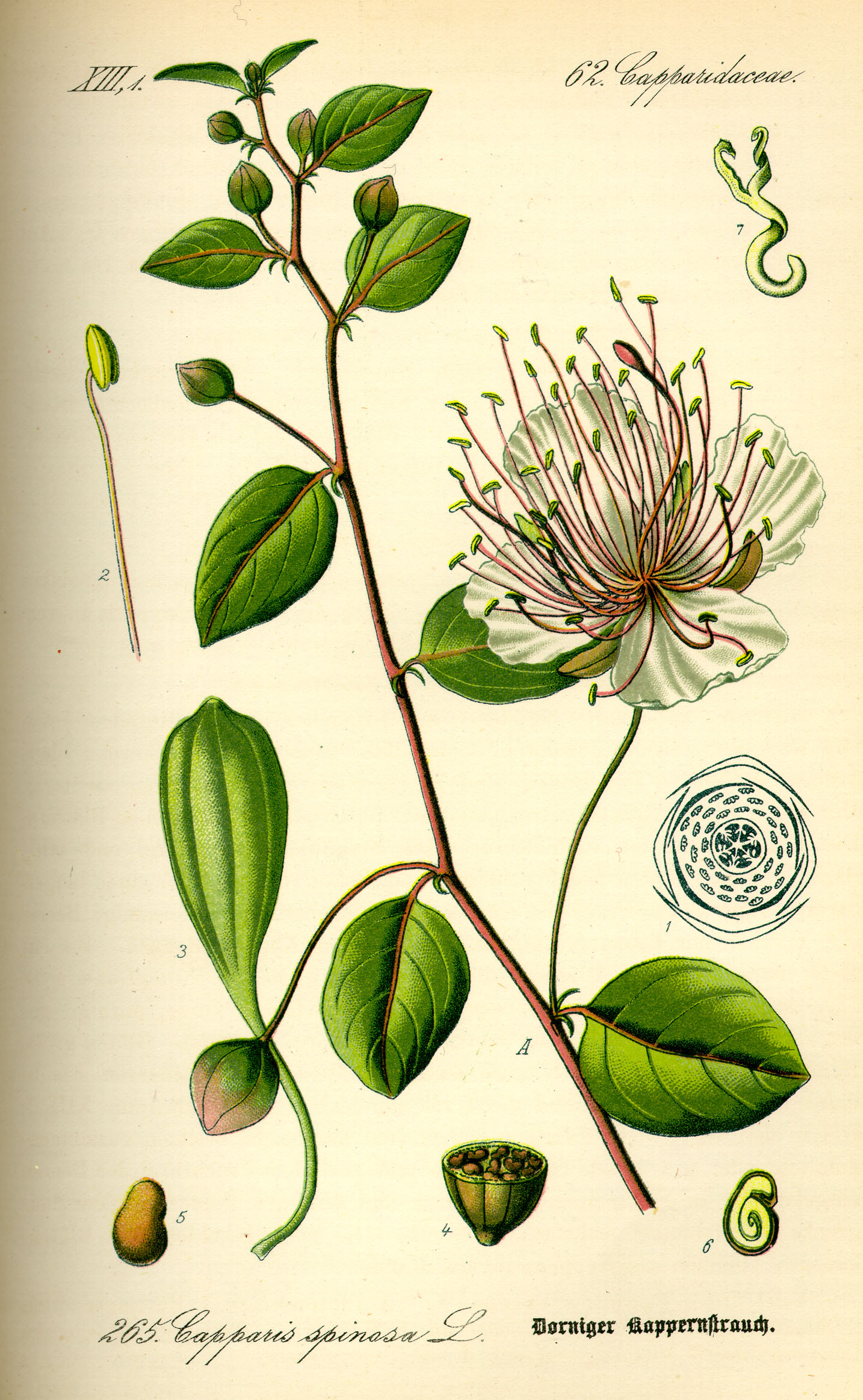
- Illustration by Otto Wilhelm Thomé

Conservation status
- Least Concern (IUCN 3.1)

Scientific classification
- Kingdom: Plantae
- Clade: Tracheophytes
- Clade: Angiosperms
- Clade: Eudicots
- Clade: Rosids
- Order: Brassicales
- Family: Capparaceae
- Genus: Capparis
- Species: C. spinosa

Binomial name
- Capparis spinosa Linnaeus, 1753

Synonyms
- Synonymy: Blumea grandiflora Zipp. ex Span.; Capparis aculeata Steud.; Capparis microphylla Ledeb.; Capparis murrayi Stewart ex Dalz.; Capparis ovalis Risso; Capparis ovata Desf.; Capparis peduncularis C.Presl; Capparis sativa Pers.

= Caper =

Capparis spinosa

Species of plant (Capparis spinosa)

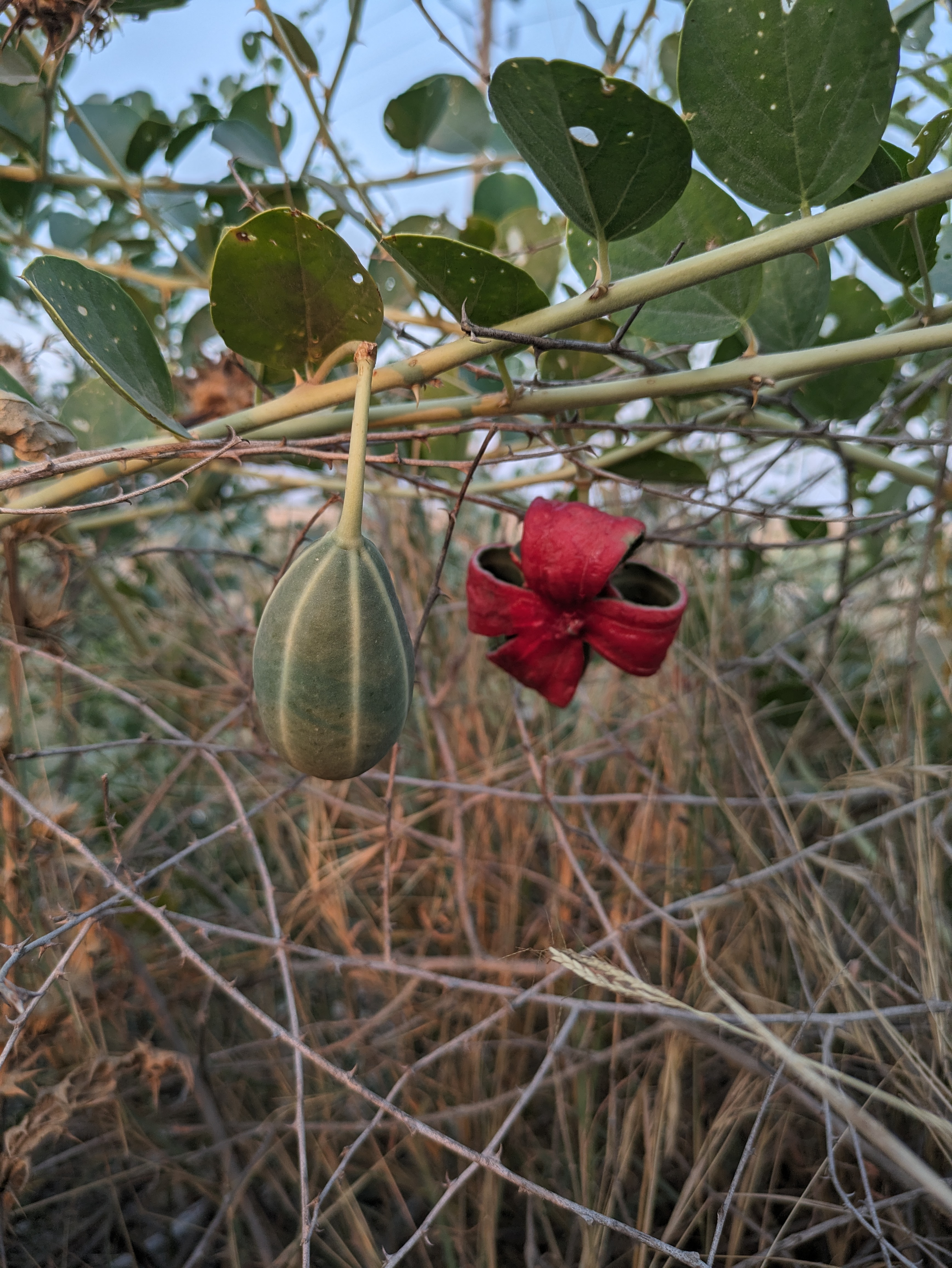
Capparis spinosa fruits in Behbahan

Capparis spinosa, the caper bush, also called Flinders rose, is a perennial plant that bears rounded, fleshy leaves and large white to pinkish-white flowers.

The taxonomic status of the species is controversial and unsettled. Species within the genus Capparis are highly variable, and interspecific hybrids have been common throughout the evolutionary history of the genus. As a result, some authors have considered C. spinosa to be composed of multiple distinct species, others that the taxon is a single species with multiple varieties or subspecies, or that the taxon C. spinosa is a hybrid between C. orientalis and C. sicula.

Capparis spinosa is native to almost all the circum-Mediterranean countries, and is included in the flora of most of them, but whether it is indigenous to this region is uncertain. The family Capparaceae could have originated in the tropics and later spread to the Mediterranean basin.

The plant is best known for the edible flower buds (capers), used as a seasoning or garnish, and the fruit (caper berries), both of which are usually consumed salted or pickled. Other species of Capparis are also picked along with C. spinosa for their buds or fruits. Other parts of Capparis plants are used in the manufacture of medicines and cosmetics.

== Description ==
Leaves and flower buds

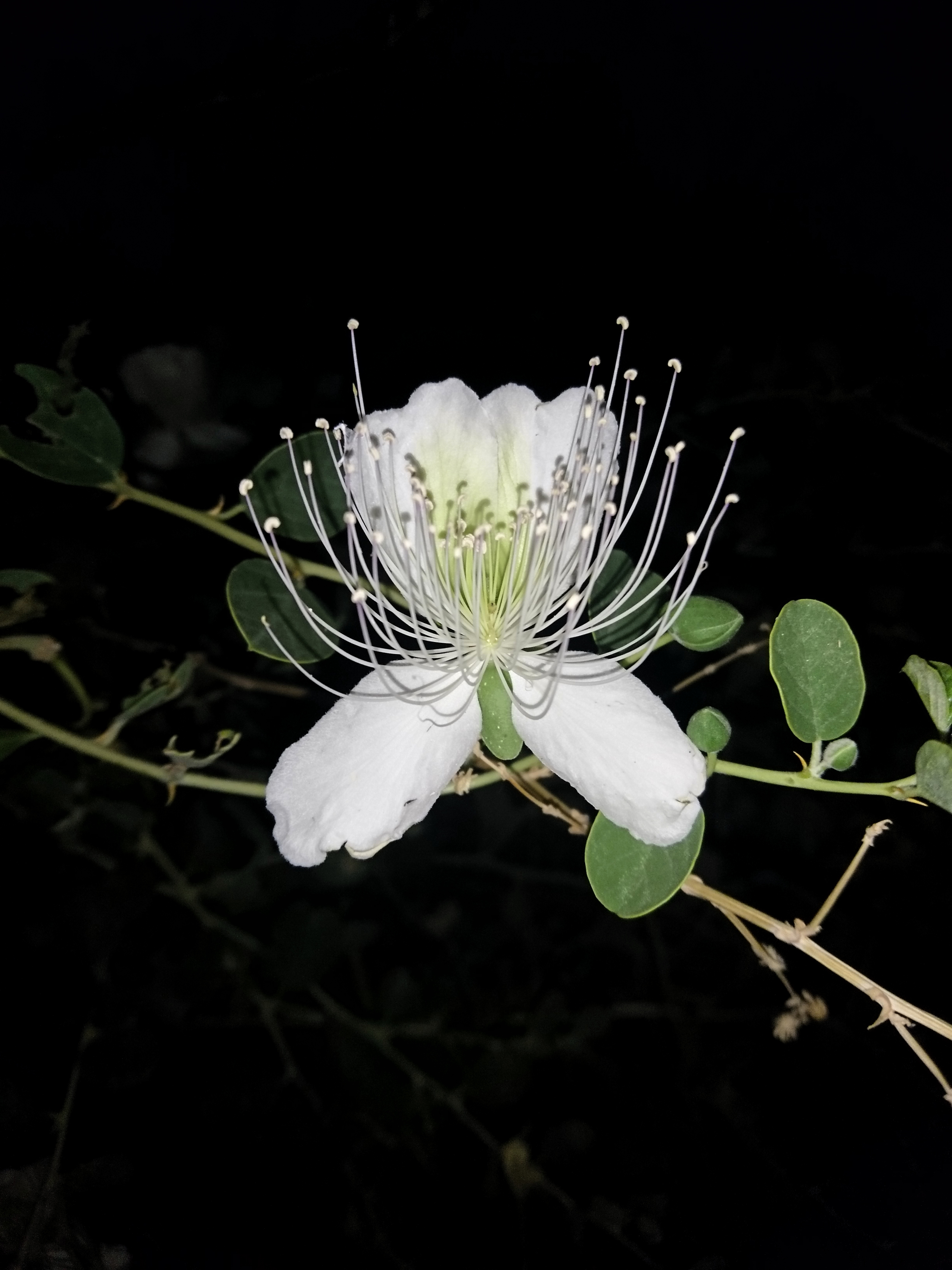
Caper flower in Behbahan

The shrubby plant is many-branched, with alternate leaves, thick and shiny, round to ovate. The flowers are complete, sweetly fragrant, and showy, with four sepals and four white to pinkish-white petals, many long violet-coloured stamens, and a single stigma usually rising well above the stamens.

== Accepted infraspecifics ==
Eleven subspecies and variants are accepted, according to Plants of the World Online:

- Capparis spinosa var. aegyptia (Lam.) Boiss.
- Capparis spinosa var. atlantica (Inocencio, D.Rivera, Obón & Alcaraz) Fici
- Capparis spinosa var. canescens Coss.
- Capparis spinosa subsp. cordifolia (Lam.) Fici
- Capparis spinosa var. herbacea (Willd.) Fici
- Capparis spinosa var. mucronifolia (Boiss.) Hedge & Lamond ex R.R.Stewart
- Capparis spinosa var. myrtifolia (Inocencio, D.Rivera, Obón & Alcaraz) Fici
- Capparis spinosa var. ovata (Desf.) Sm.
- Capparis spinosa subsp. parviflora (Boiss.) Ahmadi, H.Saeidi & Mirtadz.
- Capparis spinosa subsp. rupestris (Sm.) Nyman
- Capparis spinosa subsp. spinosa

Capparis nummularia was formerly considered a subspecies of Capparis spinosa.

== Distribution and habitat ==
Capparis spinosa ranges around the Mediterranean Basin, Arabian Peninsula, and portions of Western and Central Asia.

In southern Europe, it is found in southern Portugal, southern and eastern Spain (including the Balearic Islands), Mediterranean France including Corsica, Italy including Sicily and Sardinia, Malta, Croatia's Dalmatian islands, Albania, Greece and the Greek Islands, western and southern Turkey, on Cyprus, and on the Crimean Peninsula in Ukraine. In Spain, it ranges from sea level up to 1,300 metres (4,300 ft) in elevation.

In northern Africa, it is found throughout the north and the Atlas Mountains of Morocco, where it occurs from sea level up to 2,000 m (6,600 ft) in elevation. It is also found in northern Algeria (Kabylie, coastal Algeria, Bouzaréa, and Oran) and the Hoggar Mountains of the Algerian Sahara, in Tunisia north of the Sahara, and Cyrenaica in Libya.

In western Asia, it is found along the eastern Mediterranean in Lebanon, Palestine, Israel, Syria, western Jordan, and in the southern Sinai Peninsula of Egypt. It is also found south of the Caucasus in Armenia, Azerbaijan, Georgia, and northeastern Turkey. On the Arabian Peninsula it occurs in Oman, Yemen including Socotra, and Asir province of Saudi Arabia. In central Asia, it inhabits the mountains of central Afghanistan, the lower Karakoram range in northern Pakistan and Ladakh, and Tajikistan, Kyrgyzstan, and eastern Uzbekistan.

=== Environmental requirements ===
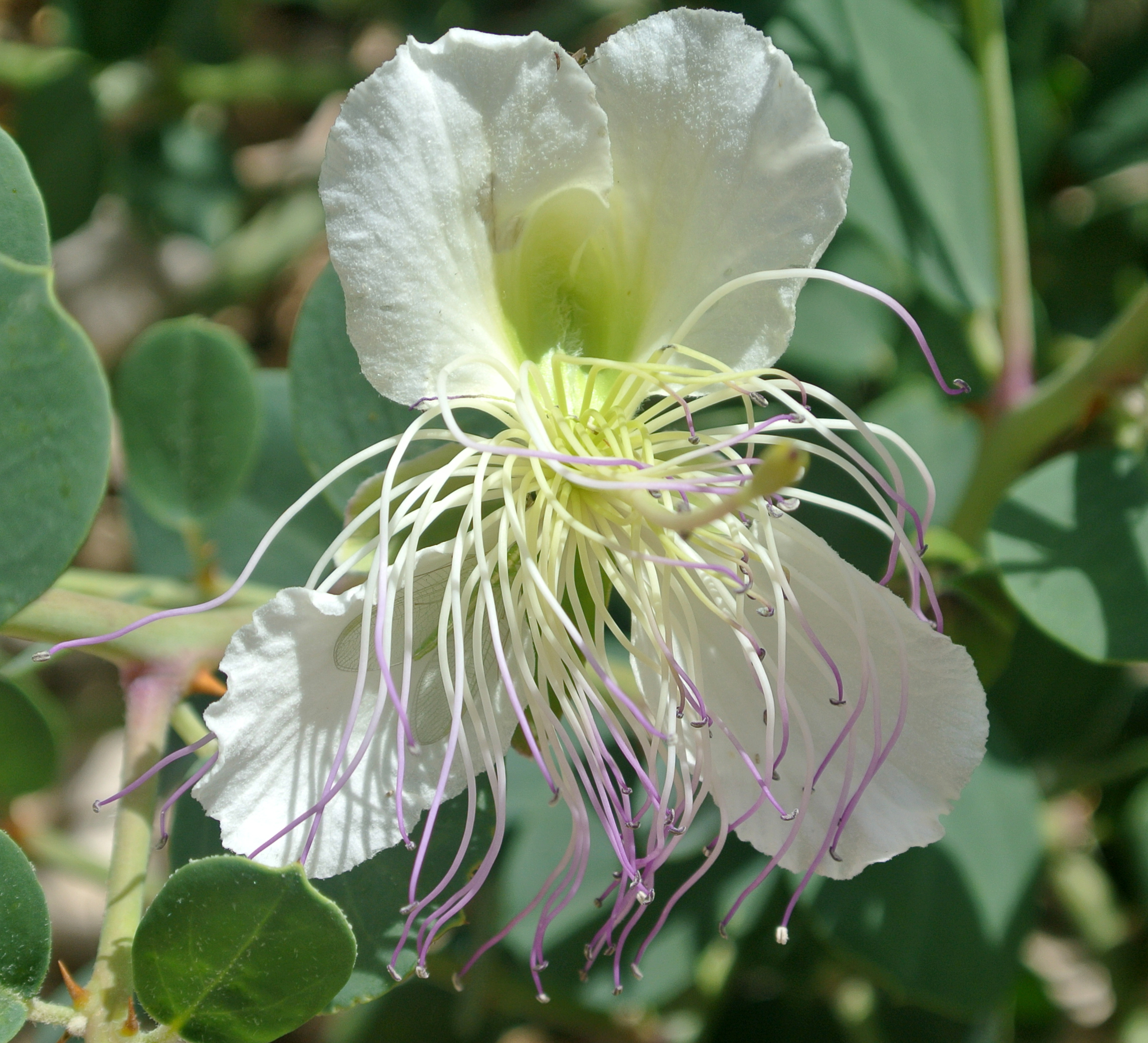
Thorny caper flower

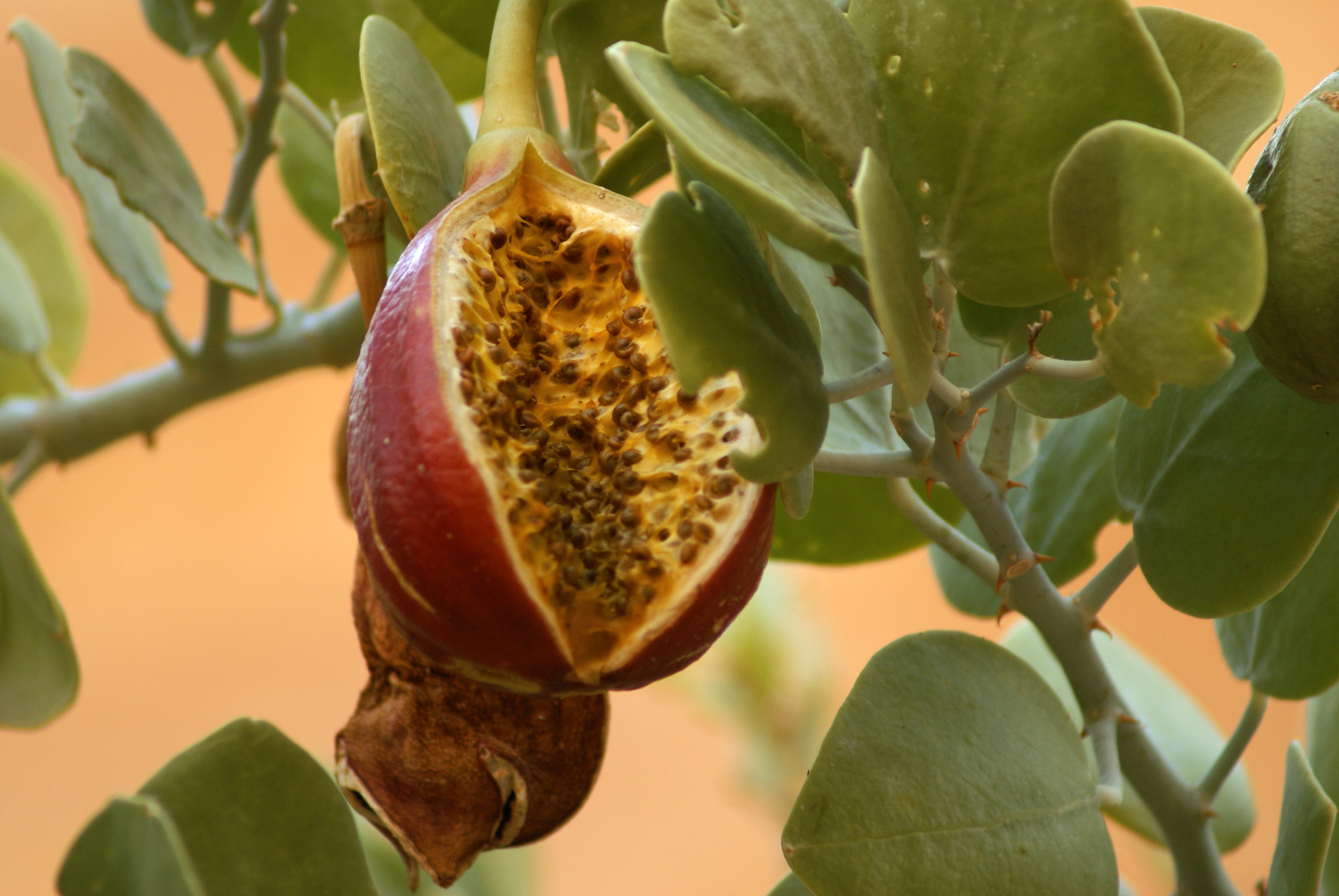
Open ripe caper fruit

The caper bush requires a semiarid or arid climate. The caper bush has developed a series of mechanisms that reduce the impact of high radiation levels, high daily temperature, and insufficient soil water during its growing period.

In response to sudden increases in humidity, the bush forms wart-like pockmarks across the leaf surface. It quickly adjusts to the new conditions and produces unaffected leaves.

== Agriculture ==
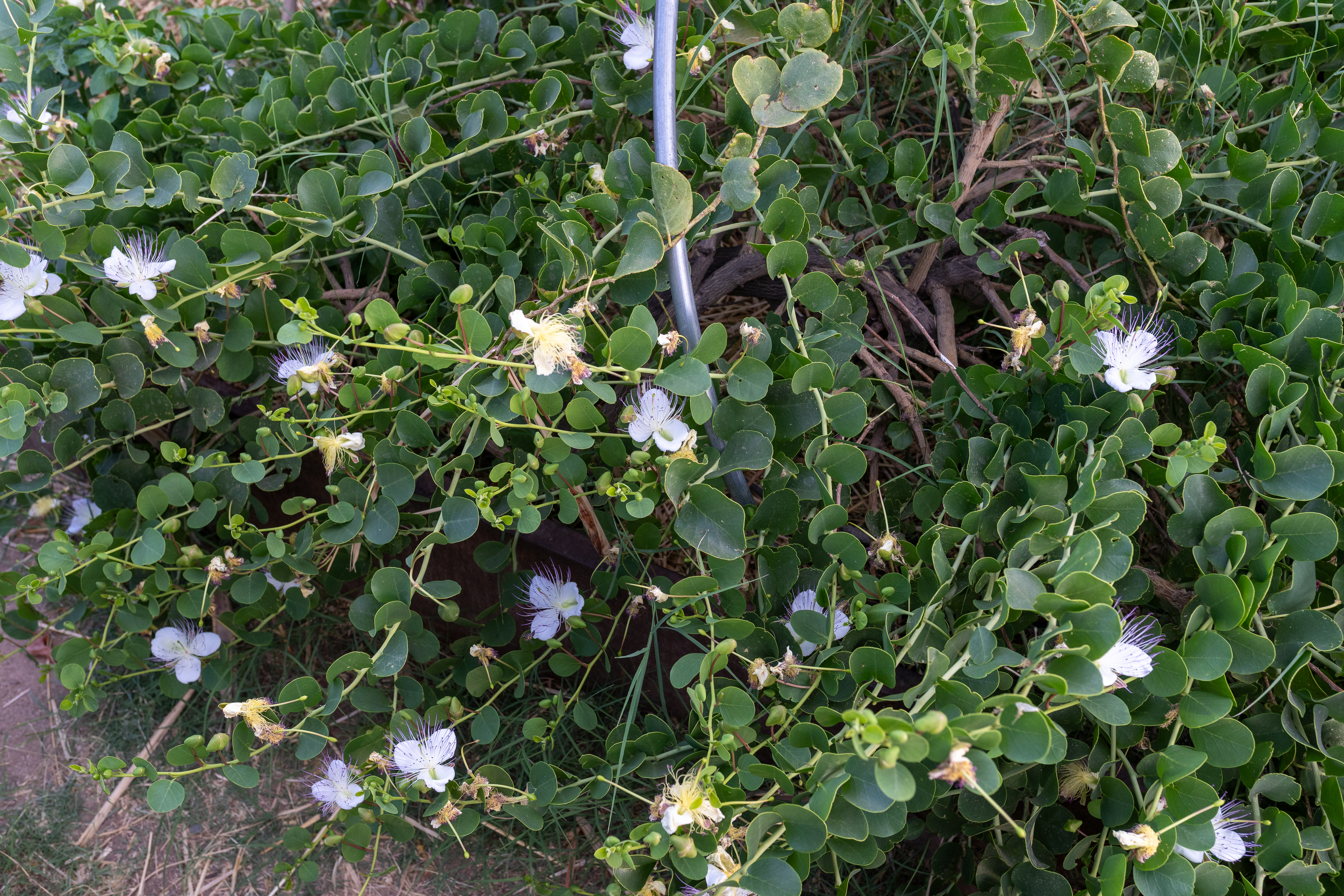
Flowering caper plant, yielding caper berries

Capers can be grown easily from fresh seeds gathered from ripe fruit and planted into a well-drained seed-raising mix. Seedlings appear in two to four weeks. Old, stored seeds enter a state of dormancy and require cold stratification to germinate. The viable embryos germinate within three to four days after partial removal of the lignified seed coats. The seed coats and the mucilage surrounding the seeds may be ecological adaptations to avoid water loss and conserve seed viability during the dry season.

=== Orchard establishment ===
Mean annual temperatures in areas under cultivation are over 14 °C (57 °F). A rainy spring and a hot, dry summer are considered advantageous. This drought-tolerant perennial plant is used for landscaping and reducing erosion along highways, steep rocky slopes, dunes or fragile semiarid ecosystems.

=== Harvest ===
Caper buds are usually picked in the morning. Because the youngest, smallest buds fetch the highest prices, daily picking is typical.

Capers may be harvested from wild plants, in which case it is necessary to know that the plant is not one of the few poisonous Capparis species that look similar. The plant normally has curved thorns that may scratch the people who harvest the buds, although a few spineless varieties have been developed.

== Uses ==
Capers, prepared, canned
Nutritional value per 100 g (3.5 oz)
- Energy: 96 kJ (23 kcal)
- Carbohydrates: 5 g
- Sugars: 0.4 g
- Dietary fiber: 3 g
- Fat: 0.9 g
- Protein: 2.4 g
Vitamins and minerals
Vitamins	Quantity %DV^{†}
Thiamine (B1)	2% 0.018 mg
Riboflavin (B2)	11% 0.139 mg
Niacin (B3)	4% 0.652 mg
Pantothenic acid (B5)	1% 0.027 mg
Vitamin B6	1% 0.023 mg
Folate (B9)	6% 23 μg
Vitamin C	4% 4 mg
Vitamin E	6% 0.88 mg
Vitamin K	21% 24.6 μg
Minerals	Quantity %DV^{†}
Calcium	3% 40 mg
Iron	9% 1.7 mg
Magnesium	8% 33 mg
Sodium	102% 2350 mg
- Other constituents: Quantity
- Water: 83.8 g
- Selenium: 1.2 μg
- Link to USDA Nutrient Database Entry
- ^{†}Percentages estimated using US recommendations for adults.

=== Nutrition ===
Canned, pickled capers are 84% water, 5% carbohydrates, 2% protein, and 1% fat. Preserved capers are particularly high in sodium due to the amount of salt added to the brine. In a typical serving of 28 grams (one ounce), capers supply 6 kcal and 35% of the Daily Value (DV) for sodium, with no other nutrients in significant content. In a 100-gram amount, the sodium content is 2350 mg or 102% DV, with vitamin K (21% DV) and riboflavin (11% DV) also having appreciable levels.

=== Culinary ===
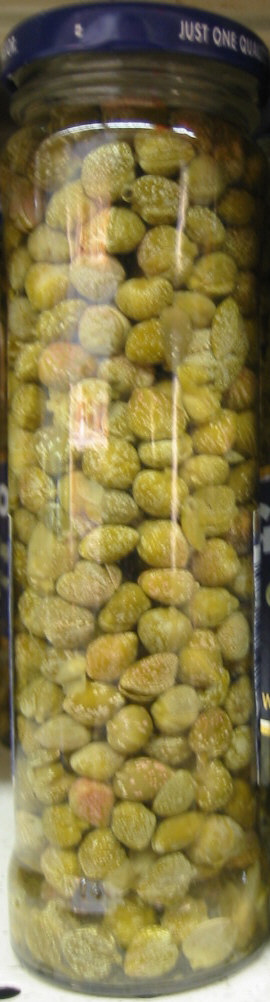
Pickled capers in a jar

The buds, when ready to pick, are a dark olive green and range in size from under 7 mm (1/4 in) to more than 14 mm (1/2 in). Once the capers are picked, they are pickled in salt or a salt and vinegar solution, and drained. Intense flavour, sometimes described as being similar to black pepper or mustard, is developed as glucocapparin, a glycoside organosulfur molecule, is released from each caper bud.

Capers are a distinctive ingredient in Italian cuisine, especially in Sicilian, Aeolian and southern Italian cooking. They are commonly used in salads, pasta salads, meat dishes, and pasta sauces. Examples of uses in Italian cuisine are piccata dishes, vitello tonnato and spaghetti alla puttanesca. In Campania, the best capers are believed to grow on Pantelleria, an island off the region's coast.

=== Polyphenols ===
Canned capers contain polyphenols, including the flavonoids quercetin (173 mg per 100 g) and kaempferol (131 mg per 100 g), as well as anthocyanins.

=== Other uses ===
==== Cosmetics ====
Capparis spinosa (caper) is rich in phenolics, flavonoids, and other bioactives that give it moisturizing, antioxidant, and anti‑inflammatory properties relevant to skin care. As of 2026, most evidence is preclinical or early clinical, but several studies and reviews directly link caper to cosmetic and dermocosmetic applications.

== History ==
Archaeobotanical evidence of capers has been found in the Mediterranean region and Mesopotamia as early as the Upper Paleolithic period.

The caper was used in ancient Greece as a carminative. It is represented in archaeological levels in the form of carbonised seeds and rarely as flower buds and fruits from archaic and classical antiquity contexts. Athenaeus in Deipnosophistae pays a lot of attention to the caper, as do Pliny (NH XIX, XLVIII.163) and Theophrastus.

Etymologically, the caper and its relatives in several European languages can be traced back to Classical Latin capparis, "caper", in turn, borrowed from the Greek κάππαρις, kápparis, whose origin (as with that of the plant) is unknown but is probably Asian. Another theory links kápparis to the name of the island of Cyprus (Κύπρος, Kýpros), where capers grow abundantly.

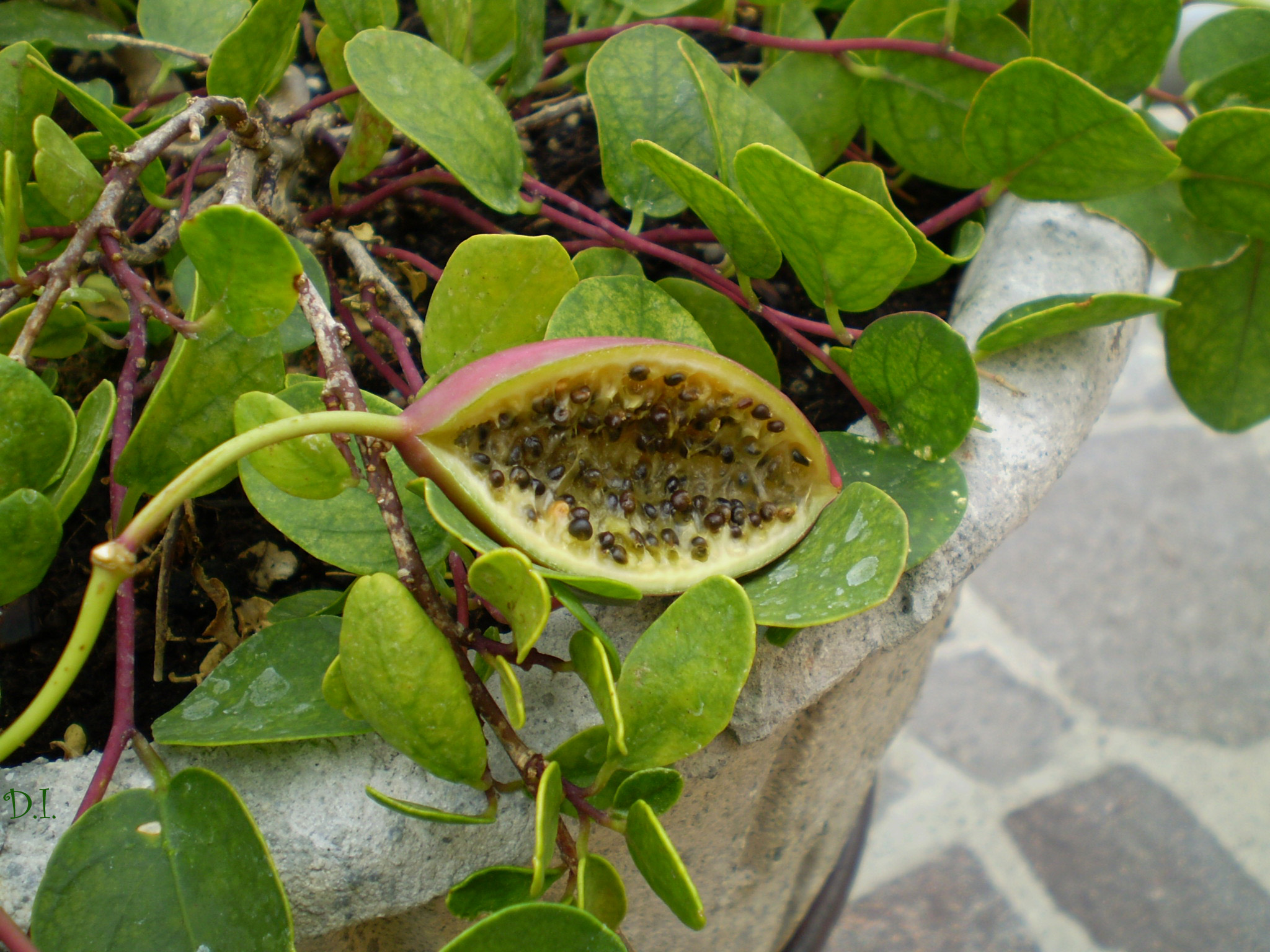
A ripe caper fruit (caper berry)

In Biblical times, the caper-berry was thought to have aphrodisiac properties. In Ecclesiastes 12:5, the Biblical Hebrew hapax aviyyonah (אֲבִיּוֹנָה) is frequently translated "caper-berry" and has been linked by some scholars to the Hebrew root אבה (a-v-h, "desire") although this etymology is disputed.

The berries (abiyyonot) were eaten, as appears from their liability to tithes and the restrictions of the 'Orlah. They are carefully distinguished in the Mishnah and the Talmud from the caper leaves, alin, shoots, temarot, and the caper buds, capperisin (note the similarity "caper"isin to "caper"); all of which were eaten as seen from the blessing requirement, and declared to be the fruit of the ẓelaf or caper plant. The "capperisin" mentioned in the Talmud are actually referring to a shell that protected the aviyyonot as it grew.

Talmud Bavli discusses the eating of caper sepals versus caper berries, both in the land of Israel and in Syria.

Capers are mentioned as a spice in the Roman cookbook Apicius.

In his 14th-century work Kaftor va-Ferach (Hebrew: כפתור ופרח), Ishtori Haparchi notes that capers were grown in the Jordan Valley region.
