= Feast of the Seven Fishes =

Italian-American Christmas Eve celebration

The Feast of the Seven Fishes (Italian: Festa dei sette pesci) is an Italian American celebration of Christmas Eve with dishes of fish and other seafood. Christmas Eve is a vigil and fasting day, and the abundance of seafood reflects the observance of abstinence from meat until the feast of Christmas Day itself.

== Origins and tradition ==
The Feast of the Seven Fishes derives its name from seven different seafood dishes that are typically served during this celebration. It is a ritualized Christmas Eve feast consumed over several hours. As an Italian-American celebration, it came along from the peak of immigration into the cities of the Northeast and the Upper Midwest (from the 1880s to the 1930s).

The tradition stems from the Roman Catholic observance of abstaining from eating meat on the eve of a feast day. As no meat or animal fat could be used on such days, observant Catholics would instead eat fish (typically fried in oil). It is unclear when or where the term "Feast of the Seven Fishes" was popularized. Nick Vadala, writing for The Philadelphia Inquirer, found the newspaper's oldest reference to the feast in a 1983 article.

The meal includes multiple (usually seven or thirteen) fish dishes. It is often erroneously claimed that the tradition is "unknown in Italy". However the tradition of a Christmas Eve meal of seven or thirteen fishes has been well-documented in Calabria. In some Italian-American families, there is no count of the number of fish dishes. A well-known dish is baccalà (salted cod fish). Fried smelts, calamari, and other types of seafood have been incorporated into the Christmas Eve dinner over the years.

The number seven may come from the seven Sacraments of the Catholic Church, or the seven hills of Rome, or some other source. There is no general agreement on its meaning.

== Typical feast ==
The meal's components may include some combination of anchovies, whiting, lobster, sardines, baccalà (dried salt cod), smelts, eels, squid, octopus, shrimp, mussels and clams. The menu may also include pasta, vegetables, baked goods and wine.

=== Popular dishes ===
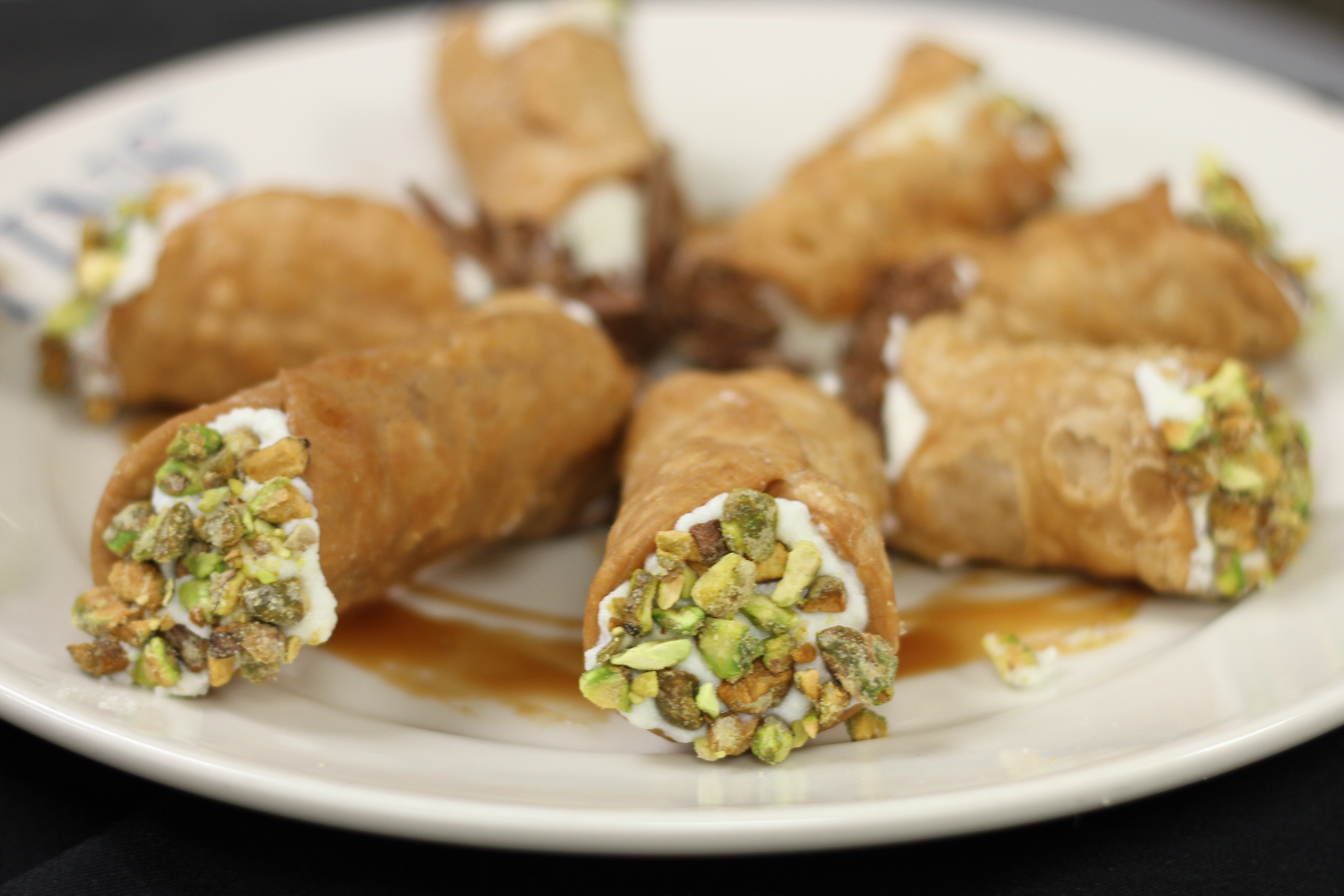
Cannoli served at the Feast of the Seven Fishes

- Baccalà with pasta, as a salad, or fried
- Baked cod
- Clams casino
- Cod fish balls in tomato sauce
- Dolphinfish
- Deep-fried calamari
- Deep-fried cod
- Deep-fried fish or shrimp
- Deep-fried scallops
- Fried smelts
- Insalata di mare (seafood salad)
- Linguine with anchovy, clam, lobster, tuna, or crab sauce
- Marinated or fried eel
- Octopus salad
- Oyster shooters
- Puttanesca with anchovies
- Scungilli salad
- Shrimp cocktail
- Stuffed calamari in tomato sauce
- Stuffed-baked lobsters
- Stuffed-baked quahogs
- Whiting

== In popular culture ==
- The graphic novel Feast of the Seven Fishes, written by Robert Tinnell (2005; ISBN 0976928809), has been made into a feature film also titled Feast of the Seven Fishes, featuring Skyler Gisondo and Madison Iseman, released November 15, 2019.
- Iron Chef Showdown had the feast of the seven fishes as a secret ingredient.
- The Bear, season 2, Episode 6, the Berzatto family meet for a Feast of the Seven Fishes: a traumatic, dysfunctional flashback where they argue at one point over the ambiguous origins of the feast — and where one guest brings an eighth fish dish, thrown out because it could ostensibly bring bad luck. The fishes also end up as a final dish for The Bear.
- "If You Give Me Seven Fishes", a song written and performed by artist Tony Trov in the style of Louis Prima, was released on Spotify, Apple Music, and YouTube in 2023.

== See also ==
- Italian-American cuisine
- List of Christmas dishes
- List of dining events
- Twelve-dish Christmas Eve supper, a similar meal in Central and Eastern European Catholic culture
- Food of The Bear (TV series)
