= Portland Rescue Mission =

Nonprofit organization based in Portland, Oregon, U.S.

- Formation: 1949; 77 years ago
- Location: Portland, Oregon, United States
- Staff: 95 (2018)
- Website: portlandrescuemission.org

Portland Rescue Mission is a nonprofit organization based in Portland, Oregon, United States. Established in 1949, the organization had 95 employees at four locations, as of 2018. Portland Rescue Mission operates a facility on West Burnside Street, near the Burnside Bridge.

In 2018, Portland Rescue Mission entered The Oregonian's annual Top Workplaces list for the first time, ranking number 25 in the category for small employers. The organizations ranked number 12 in the same category in 2021.
