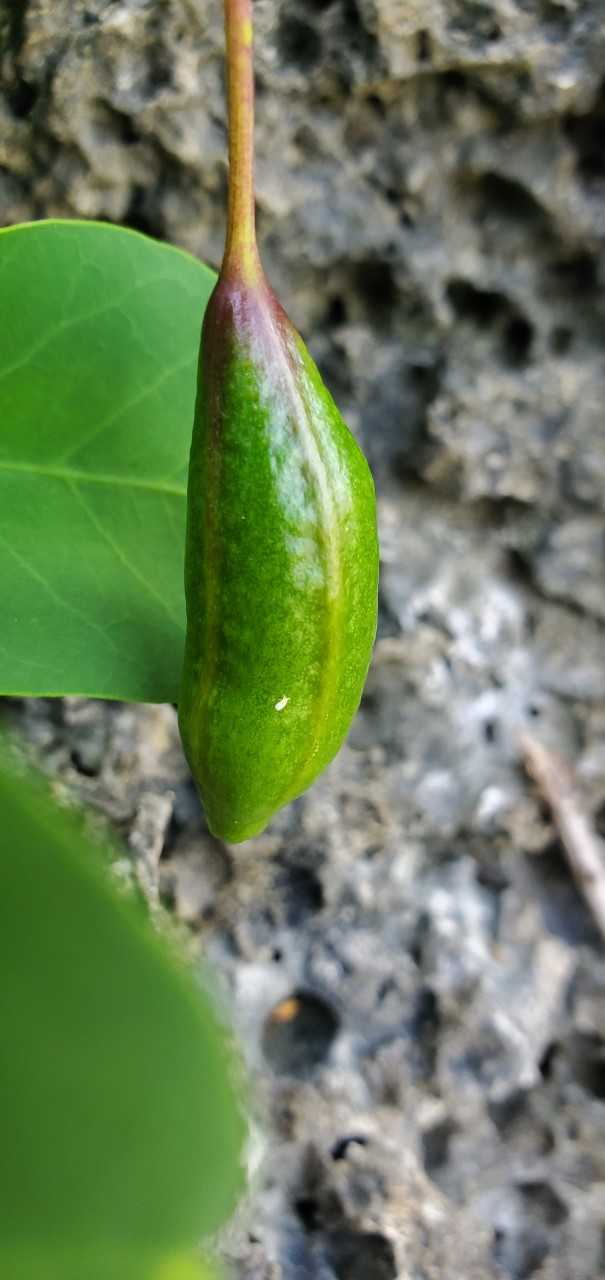
- Unripe fruit. Tamuning, Guam.

Scientific classification
- Kingdom: Plantae
- Clade: Tracheophytes
- Clade: Angiosperms
- Clade: Eudicots
- Clade: Rosids
- Order: Brassicales
- Family: Capparaceae
- Genus: Capparis
- Species: C. s. subsp. cordifolia

Binomial name
- Capparis spinosa subsp. cordifolia (Lam.) Fici

Synonyms
- Capparis cordifolia Lam.; Blumea grandiflora Zipp. ex Span.; Capparis mariana Jacq.; Capparis spinosa var. mariana (Jacq.) K.Schum.

= Capparis spinosa subsp. cordifolia =

Subspecies of caper plant

Capparis spinosa subsp. cordifolia (Chamorro: atkåpares), is a plant endemic to central Malesia and western and southern Pacific Ocean islands. It is a shrub growing along coastal limestone cliffs.

== Distribution ==
The subspecies can be found in the following islands: Caroline Islands, Cook Islands, Fiji, Lesser Sunda Islands, Mariana Islands, Marshall Islands, Nauru, New Caledonia, New Guinea, Niue, Philippines, Pitcairn Islands, Samoa, Society Islands, Solomon Islands, Tonga, Tuamotu, Tubuai Islands, Vanuatu, Wallis-Futuna Islands.

== Gallery ==
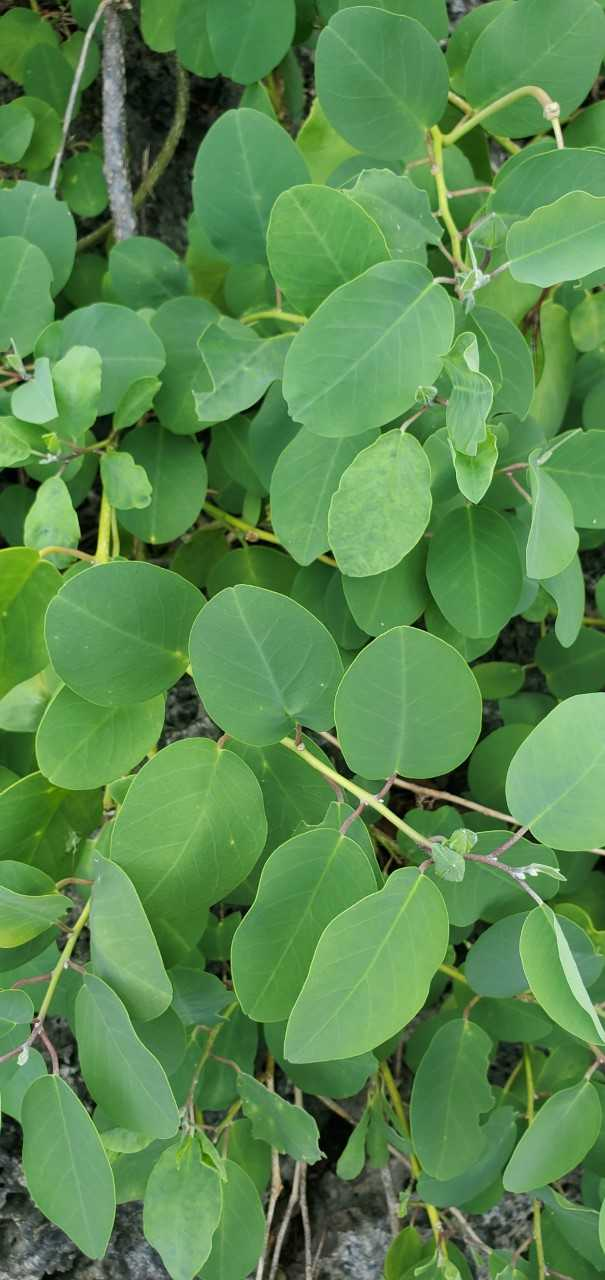
Foliage. Tamuning, Guam

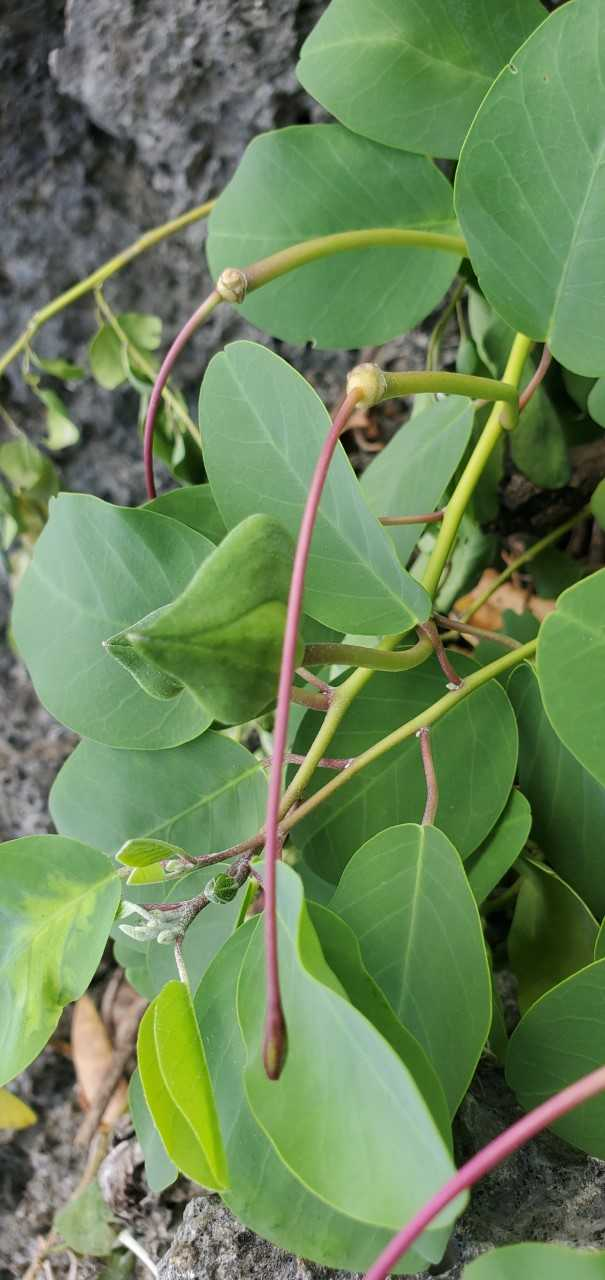
Flower buds. Tamuning, Guam
