= Union Gospel Mission =

Charity in British Columbia, Canada

- Abbreviation: UGM
- Founded: 1940
- Founder: Gordon (Bob) R. Stacey
- Type: Charitable organization
- Location: Vancouver, British Columbia
- Key people: Dean Kurpjuweit (President); Jim Barkman (Chairperson)
- Revenue: 22.67 million CAD (2018)
- Website: www.ugm.ca

Union Gospel Mission (UGM) is a charitable organization providing meals, education, shelter, safe and affordable housing, drug and alcohol recovery programs, and support services to those struggling with homelessness and addiction in Canada, with locations in the Metro Vancouver area and the city of Mission.

== History ==
In 1940, 21-year-old Gordon (Bob) Stacey returned from working with the Jerry McAuley Cremorne Rescue Mission in New York City. At this time, the city of Vancouver had attracted many Canadians suffering from the Great Depression. Stacey established the Union Gospel Mission in 1940 at 10 Powell Street, in the heart of Vancouver’s historic Gastown.

In April 2011, UGM officially opened a new headquarters at 601 East Hastings in Vancouver, marking the largest expansion in its history. The new facility is 70,000 square feet and equipped to provide 92 shelter beds, 37 affordable housing units, extended meal capacity and a live-in drug and alcohol recovery program for men.

== See also ==
- Downtown Eastside
- History of Vancouver
- Timeline of Vancouver history
