= Ben's Bread Co. =

Bakery in Seattle, Washington, U.S.

- Interactive map of Ben's Bread Co.

Restaurant information
- Location: 216 North 70th Street, Seattle, Washington, 98103, United States
- Coordinates: 47°40′47″N 122°21′21″W

Ben's Bread Co. is a bakery in Phinney Ridge, Seattle, in the U.S. state of Washington. Spouses Ben and Megan Campbell are co-owners.

== Description ==
Ben's Bread Co. operates in the Shared Roof building, in Phinney Ridge, Seattle. The bakery has offered cookies, doughnuts, granola, pastries, sandwiches, sourdough English muffins, and sourdough table bread. Pie varieties have included 'Cosmic Crisp' apple, pumpkin, and chocolate cream pie with candied hazelnuts. For Thanksgiving, Ben's Bread has carried pies, rolls, and stuffing kits.

== History ==
Before operating from a brick and mortar shop, Ben's Bread operated as a pop-up.

== Reception ==
Ben's Bread was included in Eater Seattle's 2023 list of the city's sixteen "most perfect" bakeries. In 2023, The Infatuation's Aimee Rizzo called Ben's Bread " the best new bakery in Seattle". In 2024, the bakery earned Ben Campbell a nomination in the Outstanding Pastry Chef or Baker category of the James Beard Foundation Awards.

== See also ==
- List of bakeries
