= Spaghetti alla puttanesca =

Neapolitan pasta dish

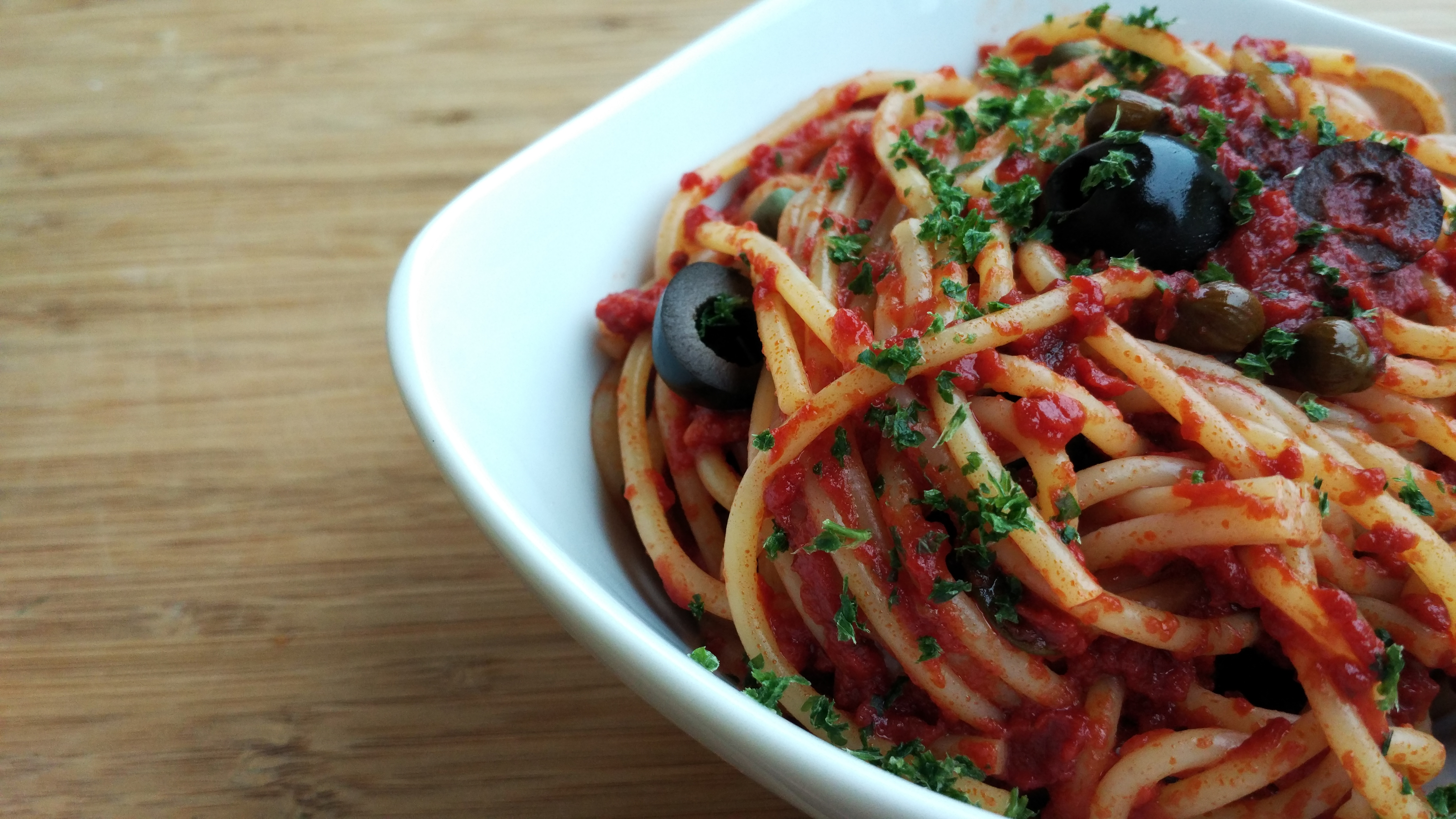
- Alternative names: Pasta alla puttanesca, pasta puttanesca
- Course: Primo (Italian course)
- Place of origin: Italy
- Region or state: Naples, Campania
- Main ingredients: Spaghetti, tomatoes, olives, capers, anchovies, garlic, peperoncino, extra virgin olive oil
- Variations: Tuna

Spaghetti alla puttanesca (Italian: [spaˈɡetti alla puttaˈneska]) is a pasta dish invented in the Italian city of Naples in the mid-20th century, typically made with tomatoes, olives, capers, anchovies, garlic, peperoncino, and extra virgin olive oil.

== Etymology ==
Because puttana means roughly 'whore' or 'prostitute' and puttanesca is an adjective derived from that word, the dish may have been invented in one of many bordellos in the Naples working-class neighbourhood of Quartieri Spagnoli as a quick meal taken between servicing clients. Alternatively, food historian Jeremy Parzen suggests: "Italians use puttana (and related words) almost the way we use shit, as an all-purpose profanity, so pasta alla puttanesca might have originated with someone saying, essentially, 'I just threw a bunch of shit from the cupboard into a pan'."

== Origin ==
Various recipes in Italian cookbooks dating back to the 19th century describe pasta sauces very similar to a modern puttanesca under different names. One of the earliest dates from 1844, when Ippolito Cavalcanti, in his Cucina teorico-pratica, included a recipe from popular Neapolitan cuisine, calling it vermicelli all'oglio con olive capperi ed alici salse. After some sporadic appearances in other Neapolitan cookbooks, in 1931 the Touring Club Italiano's Guida gastronomica d'Italia lists it among the gastronomic specialties of Campania, calling it maccheroni alla marinara.

The dish under its current name first appears in gastronomic literature in the 1960s. The earliest known mention of pasta alla puttanesca is in Raffaele La Capria's Ferito a morte (Mortal Wound), a 1961 Italian novel which mentions "spaghetti alla puttanesca come li fanno a Siracusa" (lit. 'spaghetti alla puttanesca as they make it in Syracuse'). The sauce became popular in the 1960s, according to the Professional Union of Italian Pasta Makers.

Nonetheless, the 1971 edition of the Il cucchiaio d'argento (The Silver Spoon), one of Italy's most prominent cookbooks, has no recipe with the name puttanesca, but two recipes that are similar: the Neapolitan spaghetti alla partenopea is made with anchovies and generous quantities of oregano, while spaghetti alla siciliana is distinguished by the addition of green peppers; still again, there is a Sicilian style popular around Palermo that includes olives, anchovies, and raisins. In Dom DeLuise's 1988 cookbook, Eat This... It'll Make You Feel Better!, he offers a recipe named "Puttanesca Sauce (Harlot Sauce)", which he explains was introduced to him by Caterina Valente during the filming of The Entertainers in 1964. DeLuise's recipe calls for both olives and capers, along with red pepper flakes, but no anchovies or oregano.

In a 2005 article from Il Golfo—a daily newspaper serving the Italian islands of Ischia and Procida—Annarita Cuomo asserted that sugo alla puttanesca was invented in the 1950s by Sandro Petti, co-owner of 'O Rangio Fellone, a famous Ischian restaurant and nightspot.

== Basic recipe ==
The sauce alone is called sugo alla puttanesca in Italian. Recipes may differ according to preferences; for instance, the Neapolitan version is prepared without anchovies, unlike the version popular in the Lazio region. Spices are sometimes added. In most cases, however, the sugo is a little salty (from the capers, olives, and anchovies) and quite fragrant (from the garlic). Traditionally, the sauce is served with spaghetti, although it is also paired with penne, bucatini, linguine, and vermicelli.

Garlic and anchovies (omitted in the Neapolitan version) are sautéed in olive oil. Chopped chili peppers, olives, capers, diced tomatoes, and oregano are added, along with salt and black pepper to taste. The cook then reduces this mixture by simmering and mixes it with the spaghetti al dente. The final touch is a topping of parsley.

== Culture ==
As of the late 1990s in Naples, the term "puttanesca" rarely appeared on menus; rather, the sauce was referred to as marinara. A marinara sauce in the Campania region was not simply a tomato sauce, as it was elsewhere, as it contained fish, often anchovy. By adding capers and olives, some Neapolitans could distinguish the dish of puttanesca from this marinara. Others did not draw such a distinction, considering a marinara and puttanesca sauce identical.

== See also ==
Media related to Spaghetti alla puttanesca at Wikimedia Commons Spaghetti alla Puttanesca at the Wikibooks Cookbook subproject

- List of pasta
- List of pasta dishes
