= Elephants Delicatessen =

Caterer based in Portland, Oregon, U.S.

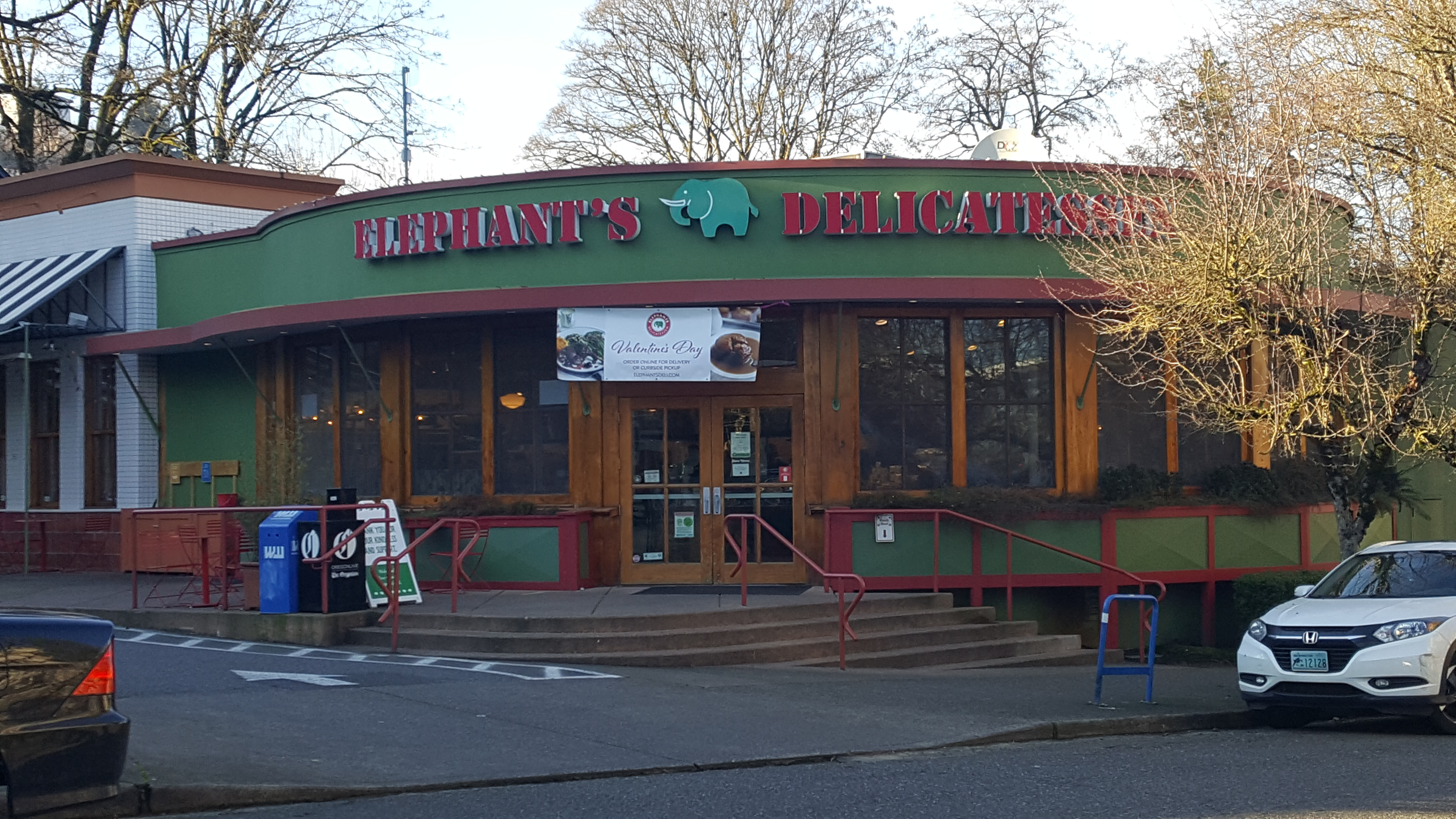
- Exterior of the flagship store in Portland, Oregon's Northwest District, 2022

- Location within Portland, Oregon

Restaurant information
- Established: April 1979
- Owner: The Ground
- Location: 700 Southeast Clay Street, Portland, Oregon, United States
- Coordinates: 45.5113466°N 122.65851°W
- Reservations: No
- Website: elephantsdeli.com

Elephants Delicatessen is a local delicatessen and catering chain based in Portland, Oregon, in the United States, established in 1979. There are seven store locations as of March 2026.

== History ==
Elaine and Jake Tanzer founded the company in April 1979.

Co-owner Anne Weaver was the chief executive officer for 40 years and was replaced by Martin McClanan in June 2025. Scott Weaver is executive chef, as of 2019. For the first 21 years after opening, it operated from a single location.

Elephants had 439 employees, as of 2019.

Kim Stafford has a writing shed with a wall made of boards from the original Elephants.

In March 2026, its flagship location on NW 22nd Ave in Portland was significantly damaged in a human caused fire. A 56 year old female transient started the fire "accidentally" while using a torch lighter to "look for food" in the trash container outside the restaurant. The perpetrator had been previously told to not come to the store before the fire due to unpleasant interaction with store's staff. It is slated to reopen sometime in 2027 several blocks away at Uptown Shopping Center, the shopping center where Elephant originally started in 1979. It opeated at the Uptown Shopping Center from 1979 to 2004.

The company was acquired by a Carlton, Oregon based hospitality company The Ground in October 2026.

== Reception ==
Elephants was included in The Oregonian's 2019 "Top Workplaces" list of "99 great places to work" in Oregon and Southwest Washington. The company ranked number 24 in Oregon Business's 2021 list of "100 Best Green Workplaces in Oregon".

Elephants won in the Best Catering Service category of Willamette Week's annual 'Best of Portland' readers' poll in 2020, 2022, and 2024. It ranked second in the same category and won in the Best Deli category in 2025. In 2026, Elephants won in the Best Catering Service, Best Deli, and Best Prepared Food categories.

== See also ==
- List of delicatessens
