= Papa Haydn (restaurant) =

Restaurant in Portland, Oregon, U.S.

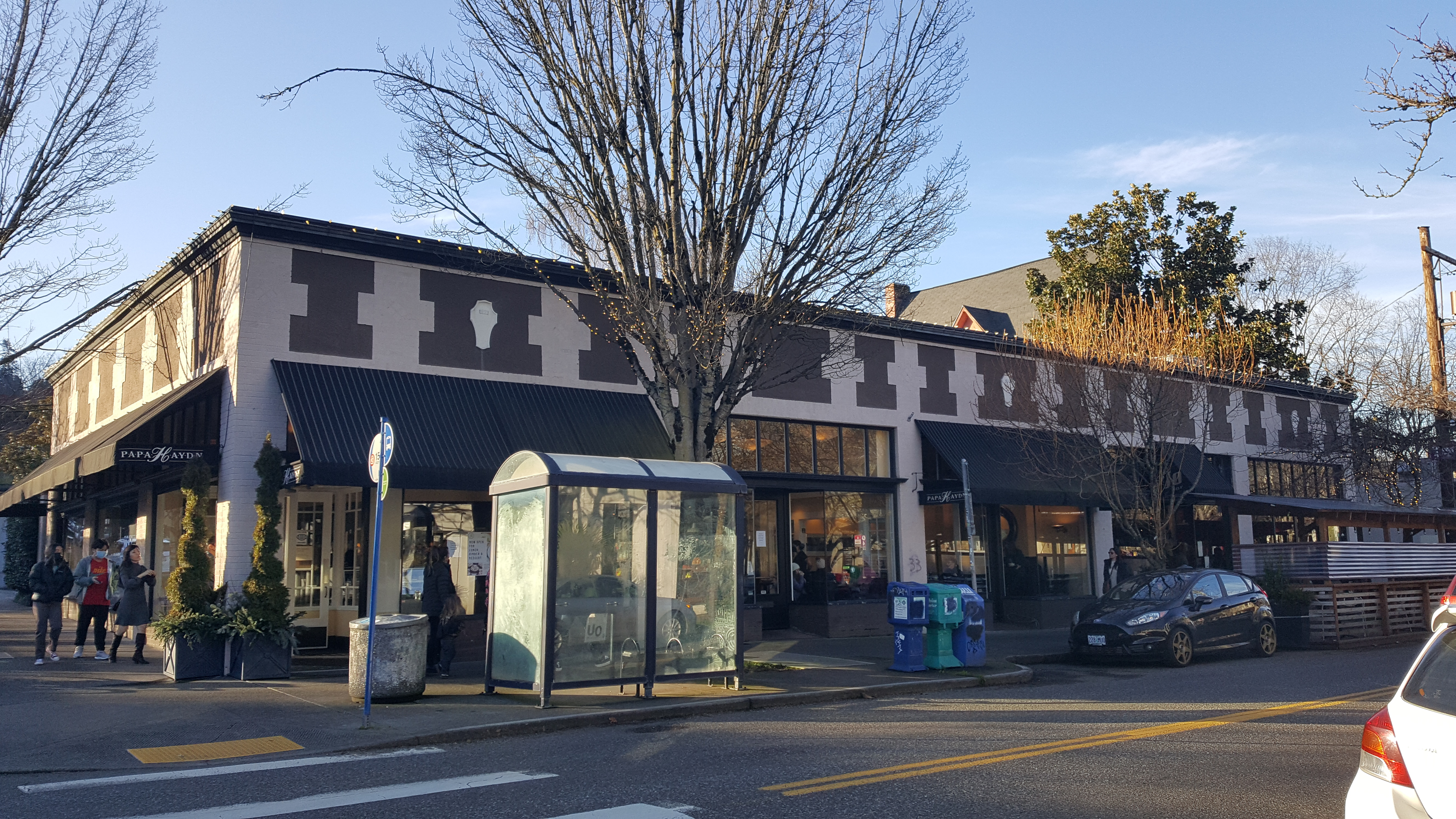
- Exterior of the restaurant in northwest Portland, Oregon's Northwest District, 2022
- Interactive map of Papa Haydn

Restaurant information
- Owners: Michael and Evelyn Gibbons
- Location: Portland, Multnomah, Oregon, 97210, United States
- Coordinates: 45.5279°N 122.6987°W
- Website: papahaydn.com

Papa Haydn is a restaurant with two locations in Portland, Oregon, United States.

== Description ==
Papa Haydn is a restaurant with locations in northwest Portland's Northwest District and southeast Portland's Sellwood-Moreland neighborhood. The menu has included French onion soup.

== History ==
Spouses Michael and Evelyn Gibbons have owned the business since 1978.

== Reception ==
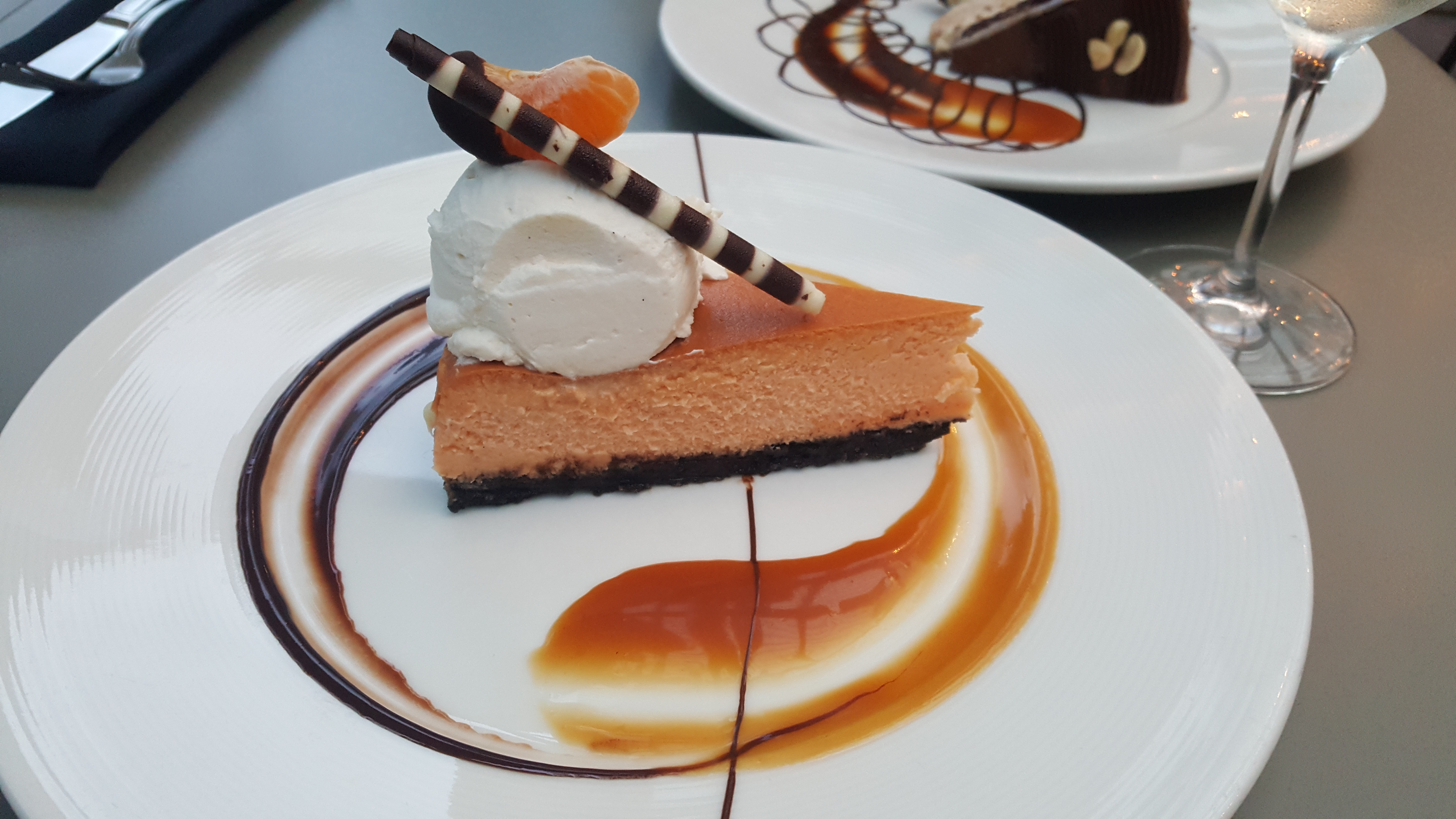
Citrus cheesecake

Michelle Lopez included the Triple Chocolate Cake in Eater Portland's 2019 list of "11 Restaurants Where Dessert Steals the Show". She said, "Although Papa Haydn, an old school Portland institution, is famed for its extensive pastry case, the triple chocolate cake stands out from the rest due to its relative simplicity. Diners looking for an elevated version of a nostalgic, birthday-party-style chocolate cake should look no further." The website's Alex Frane included the restaurant in his 2019 overview of "where to imbibe and dine" in Sellwood and its Westmoreland district. Rebecca Roland included the boccone colce in Eater Portland's 2025 overview of the city's eleven best restaurants for desserts.

Brittany Anas selected Papa Haydn for Oregon in her 2022 list of "The Best Dessert Menu in Every State" for Eat This, Not That. She wrote, "The desserts at Papa Haydn are almost too pretty to eat. Almost."

== See also ==
- List of restaurant chains in the United States
