= List of Australian plants termed "native" =

This is a list of Australian plants which have had a common name prefixed with the adjective "native".

Early European settlers in Australia were confronted with a large variety of unaccustomed animals and plants, and in many cases gave them familiar names qualified with the adjective "native", based on some fancied resemblance, so what is now a koala was called a "native bear" and the dingo a "native dog". Many of these terms are of historic interest only.

Name	Old binomial name (Note: As reported in Edward E. Morris (1896). Dictionary of Australian Words.)	Modern synonym	Notes
Native apple			
→ Apple berry	Billardiera scandens		bush food
→ Black apple	Achras australis	Pouteria australis or Planchonella australis	brush apple, wild plum
→ Emu apple	Owenia acidula		mooley apple
→ Logan apple	Acronychia acidia	Acronychia imperforata	Fraser Island apple
→ Mulga apple	Acacia aneura		the "apple" is an edible insect gall
→ Oak apple	Casuarina stricta	Allocasuarina verticillata	young cones may be chewed
→ Rose apple	Owenia cerasifera	Owenia acidula var.	sweet plum
Native arbutus	Gaultheria hispida		snowberry, chucky chucky; edible
Native banana	Musa banksii Musa hillii Musa fitzalani	Musa banksii varieties ?	
Native banyan	Ficus rubiginosa		rusty fig, Port Jackson fig
Native beech	Callicoma serratifolia		black wattle, wild quince
Native blackberry	Rubus moluccanus Rubus parvifolius Rubus rosifolius		Molucca bramble Japanese bramble Mauritius raspberry
Native borage	Pollichia zeylanica	Trichodesma zeylanicum	Northern bluebell, camel bush, horse bush
Native box	Bursaria spinosa		boxthorn, native olive
Native bread	Polyporus mylitta	Laccocephalum mylittae	edible, though not tasty, fungus
Native broom	Viminaria denudata		
Native burnet	Acaena ovina	Acaena agnipola x Acaena echinata	Australian Sheep's Burr
Native cabbage	Nasturtium palustre	Rorippa palustris	not endemic to Australia
Native carrot	Daucus brachiatus	Daucus glochidiatus	not endemic to Australia
Native cascarilla	Croton verreauxii		green native cascarilla
Native celery	Apium australe Apium prostratum		not endemic to Australia; Tasmanian species
Native centaury	Erythraea australis	Schenkia australis	
Native cherry	Exocarpus cupressiformis		
Native cranberry	Pernettya tasmanica	Gaultheria tasmanica	native to Tasmania
Native cranberry	Styphelia sapida	Lissanthe sapida	
Native cranberry	Styphelia humifusa	Astroloma humifusum	
Native cumquat	Atalantia glauca	Eremocitrus glauca	desert lemon, desert lime
Native currant	Coprosma billardieri	Coprosma quadrifida	
Native currant	Leucopogon richei		
Native currant	Myoporum serratum	Myoporum insulare	blueberry tree, native juniper
Native daisy	Brachycome decipiens	Brachyscome decipiens	
Native damson	Nageia spinulosa	Podocarpus spinulosus	native plum
Native dandelion	Podolepis acuminata	Podolepis robusta	mountain lettuce
Native daphne	Myoporum viscorum	Myoporum viscosum	dogwood, waterbush
Native date	Capparis canescens		
Native deal	Nageia elata	Podocarpus elatus	
Native elder Native elderberry	Sambucus xanthocarpa Sambucus gaudichaudiana	Sambucus australasica Sambucus gaudichaudiana	white elderberry; edible
Native flax	Linum marginale		
Native fuchsia	Correa speciosa	Correa reflexa var. speciosa	eastern correa
Native fuchsia	Eremophila maculata		spotted fuchsia-bush
Native furze	Hakea ulicina		furze hakea
Native ginger	Alpinia caerulea		Australian ginger; edible
Native grape	Vitis hypoglauca	Cissus hypoglauca	Gippsland grape; edible
Native hickory	Acacia leprosa		cinnamon wattle
Native holly	Coprosma hirtella		Tasmania
Native holly	Lomatia ilicifolia		
Native hops	Dodonaea spp.	various	
Native hops	Daviesia latifolia		hop bitter-pea
Native hyacinth	Thelymitra longifolia		
Native indigo	Swainsonia spp.		
Native indigo	Indigofera australis		Tasmania
Native ivy	Muehlenbeckia adpressa		Macquarie Harbour vine
Native jasmine	Ricinocarpos pinifolius		wedding bush
Native juniper	Myoporum serratum	Myoporum insulare	blueberry tree, native currant
Native kumquat	Atalantia glauca	Eremocitrus glauca	desert lemon, desert lemon
Native laburnum	Goodenia lotifolia	Goodenia	
Native laburnum	Cassia marksiana		
Native laurel	Pittosporum undulatum		mock orange
Native laurel	Panax elegans		light sycamore
Native lavender	Styphelia australis	Leucopogon australis	spiked beard-heath
Native leek	Bulbine bulbosa		native onion; poisonous
Native lilac	Melia composita		not endemic
Native lilac	Prostanthera rotundifolia		round-leaf mint bush
Native lime	Citrus australasica Citrus australis		finger lime native orange
Native lucerne	Sida rhombifolia		Queensland hemp; not endemic
Native mangrove	Rhizophorea mucronata	Rhizophora mucronata	
Native mangrove	Avicennia officinalis		
Native mangrove	Acacia longifolia		Tasmanian name for Boobialla
Native mignonette	Stackhousia linariaefolia	Stackhousia monogyna	creamy candles
Native millet	Panicum decompositum		
Native mint	Mentha australis		river mint, native peppermint
Native mistletoe	Loranthus spp.		
Native mulberry	Hedycarya cunninghami	Hedycarya angustifolia	smooth holly
Native mulberry	Pipturus propinquus	Pipturus argenteus	Queensland grasscloth plant
Native mulberry	Litsaea ferruginea	Litsea spp.	pigeonberry tree
Native myrtle	Myoporum serratum	Myoporum insulare	native currant, native juniper, blueberry tree
Native nectarine	Owenia acidula		emu apple
Native oak	Casuarina spp.		
Native olive	Bursaria spinosa		boxthorn, native box
Native onion	Bulbine bulbosa		native leek; poisonous
Native orange	Citrus australis		native lime, finger lime
Native orange	Capparis mitchellii		native pomegranate
Native passionflower	Passiflora spp.		some are indigenous
Native peach	Santalum acuminatum Elaeocarpus grandis		quandong
Native pear	Hakea acicularis	Hakea sericea	bushy needlewood
Native pennyroyal	Mentha gracilis	Mentha satureioides	creeping mint
Native pepper	Piper novae-hollandiae		
Native plantain	Plantago varia	Plantago spp.	
Native plum	Nageia spinulosa	Podocarpus spinulosus	native damson
Native pomegranate	Capparis nobilis Capparis mitchelli	Capparis arborea Capparis canescens Capparis mitchellii	caper tree wild orange native orange
Native potato	Gastrodia sesamoides		
Native quince	Owenia acidula		emu apple
Native quince	Petalostigma quadriloculare	Petalostigma	crab-tree, quinine tree
Native raspberry	Rubus gunnianus Rubus rosaefolius		Tasmania mainland Australia
Native rocket	Epacris lanuginosa		
Native sandalwood	Santalum persicarium	Santalum murrayanum	see also Santalum spicatum, Santalum lanceolatum
Native sandalwood	Alyxia buxifolia		sea box, dysentery bush
Native sarsaparilla	Hardenbergia monophylla		
Native sassafras	Atherosperma moschatum		
Native scarlet runner	Kennedya prostrata	Kennedia prostrata	scarlet runner
Native shamrock	Lotus australis		
Native speedwell	Veronica formosa		
Native tamarind	Diploglottis cunninghamii		
Native tobacco	Cassinia billardieri	Apalochlamys spectabilis	showy cassinia, fireweed
Native tobacco	Duboisia hopwoodii		pituri, pitchery
Native tobacco	Nicotiana suaveolens		
Native tulip	Telopea oreades spp.		waratah
Native willow	Acacia longifolia		
Native yam	Dioscorideae hastifoliae	Dioscorea hastifolia	
