= Native pomegranate =

Native pomegranate may refer to:

- Balaustion, a plant genus from Western Australia
- Capparis arborea, a plant species from eastern Australia
- Capparis canescens, a plant species from eastern Australia
- Capparis mitchellii, a plant species found all over Australia (a.k.a. native orange)

== See also ==
- Pomegranate
