= Sticky boobialla =

Sticky boobialla is a common name for several plants and may refer to:

- Myoporum petiolatum
- Myoporum viscosum, endemic to South Australia
