= Leucopogon interstans =

Scientific classification
- Kingdom: Plantae
- Clade: Tracheophytes
- Clade: Angiosperms
- Clade: Eudicots
- Clade: Asterids
- Order: Ericales
- Family: Ericaceae
- Genus: Leucopogon
- Species: L. interstans

Binomial name
- Leucopogon interstans Hislop
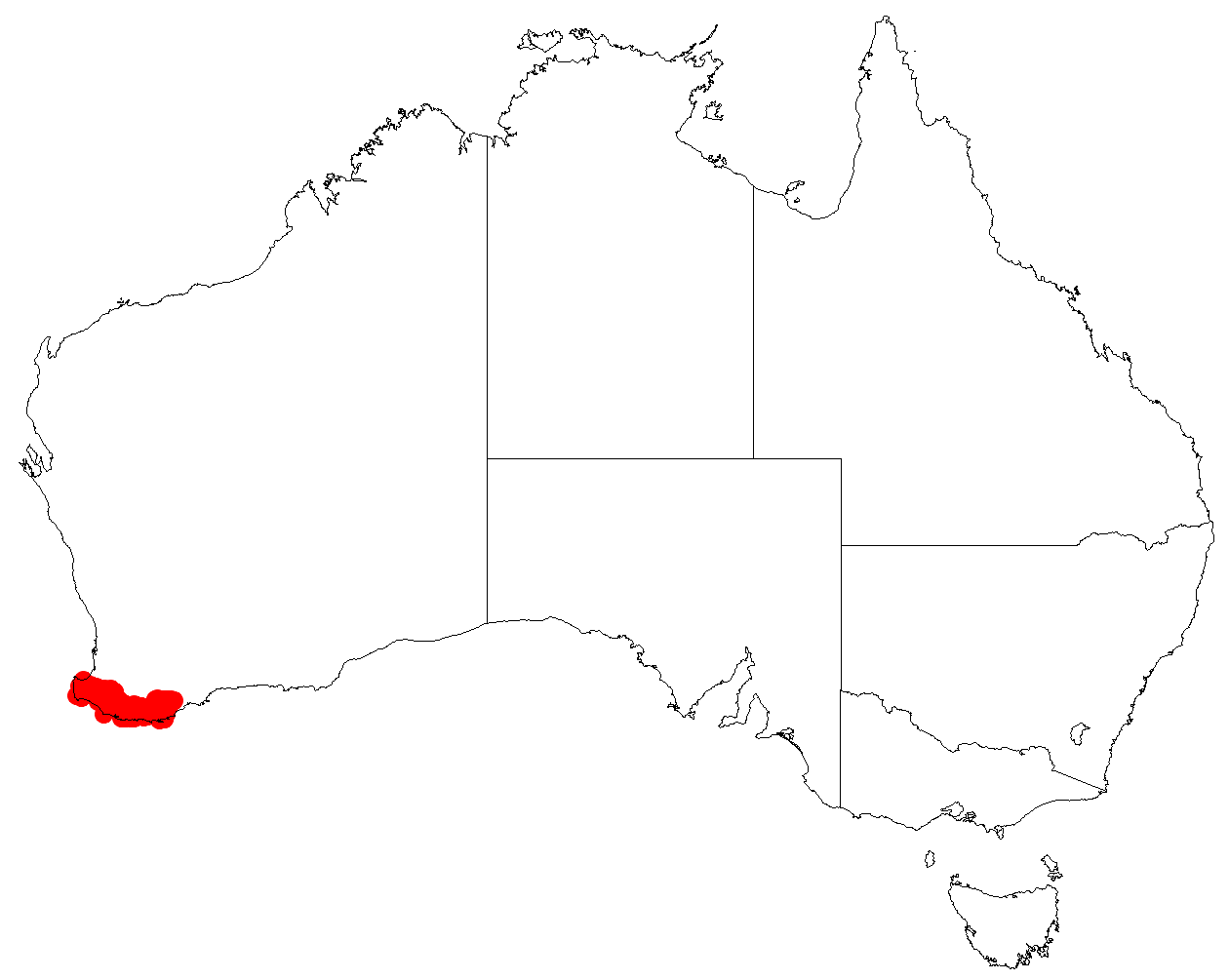
- Occurrence data from AVH

Species of plant

Leucopogon interstans is a species of flowering plant in the heath family Ericaceae and is endemic to the south-west of Western Australia. It is an erect shrub with brownish hairs on its young branchlets, erect, narrowly elliptic or narrowly egg-shaped leaves and white or pinkish flowers in groups in upper leaf axils or on the ends of branches.

== Description ==
Leucopogon interstans is an erect shrub that typically grows up to about 1.5 m (4 ft 11 in) high and 1.2 m (3 ft 11 in) wide, its young branchlets usually sparsely covered with light bown or reddish-brown hairs. The leaves are erect, narrowly elliptic or narrowly egg-shaped, sometimes with the narrower end towards the base, 13–53 mm (0.51–2.09 in) long and 1.3–5 mm (0.051–0.197 in) wide on an indistinct or short petiole. The leaves are more or less flat and glabrous, the lower surface a paler shade of green. The flowers are arranged in groups of 5 to 14 at the ends of branchlets, or in upper leaf axils, with egg-shaped bracts 0.7–1 mm (0.028–0.039 in) long and lightly larger bracteoles, the sepals egg-shaped and 1.4–2.2 mm (0.055–0.087 in) long. The petals are joined at the base to form a broadly bell-shaped tube 1.0–1.6 mm (0.039–0.063 in) long, the lobes white, often tinged with pink and 1.7–2.7 mm (0.067–0.106 in) long. Flowering mainly occurs from August to October and the fruit is a glabrous, elliptic to spherical drupe 3.0–4.5 mm (0.12–0.18 in) long.

== Taxonomy and naming ==
Leucopogon interstans was first formally described in 2008 by Michael Clyde Hislop in the journal Nuytsia from specimens collected near Rocky Gully in 1982. The specific epithet (interstans) means "standing in between", referring to this species being "somewhat intermediate" between L. australis and L. capitellatus.

== Distribution and habitat ==
This leucopogon grows in woodland and forest, sometimes in heath at higher altitudes, and is widespread in the area between the Scott River near Augusta, Albany, Bridgetown and the Stirling Range in the Avon Wheatbelt, Esperance Plains, Jarrah Forest and Warren bioregions of south-western Western Australia.

== Conservation status ==
Leucopogon interstans is listed as "not threatened" by the Government of Western Australia Department of Biodiversity, Conservation and Attractions.
