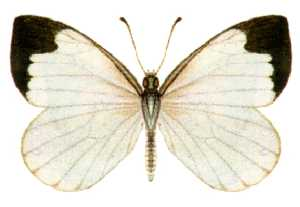

Scientific classification
- Kingdom: Animalia
- Phylum: Arthropoda
- Class: Insecta
- Order: Lepidoptera
- Family: Pieridae
- Genus: Elodina
- Species: E. angulipennis

Binomial name
- Elodina angulipennis (Lucas, 1852)

Synonyms
- Terias angulipennis Lucas, 1852; Pieris pallene Hewitson, 1853; Terias nivea C. Felder, 1862 (unavailable name)

= Elodina angulipennis =

Common pearl white

Species of butterfly

Elodina angulipennis (common pearl white) is a butterfly in the family Pieridae. It is found along the north-eastern coast of Australia.

The wingspan is about 40 mm.

The larvae feed on various Capparaceae species, including Capparis arborea and Capparis canescens. Full-grown larvae reach a length of about 20 mm. Pupation takes place in a green pupa.
