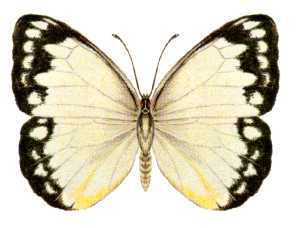

Scientific classification
- Kingdom: Animalia
- Phylum: Arthropoda
- Class: Insecta
- Order: Lepidoptera
- Family: Pieridae
- Genus: Cepora
- Species: C. perimale

Binomial name
- Cepora perimale (Donovan, 1805)

Synonyms
- Papilio perimale Donovan, 1805; Pieris lanassa Boisduval, 1836; Pieris rachel Boisduval, 1836; Pieris nabis Lucas, 1852; Pieris periclea Felder & Felder, 1865; Pieris narses Wallace, 1867; Belenois pallida Grose-Smith, 1894; Pieris hartei Ribbe, 1901; Pieris scyllara Macleay, 1826; Belenois dohertyana Grose-Smith, 1894; Belenois latilimbata Butler, 1876

= Cepora perimale =

Caper gull

Species of butterfly

Cepora perimale, the caper gull, is a butterfly in the family Pieridae. It is found on Norfolk Island and in New South Wales, the Northern Territory, Queensland, Victoria, Western Australia, Fiji, Irian Jaya, Maluku, Sulawesi, New Caledonia, Papua New Guinea, the Solomon Islands and Vanuatu.

The wingspan is 40 mm.

The larvae feed on Capparis canescens, Capparis mitchellii and Capparis sepiaria. In Australia, they have also been recorded to lay on Capparis lucida.

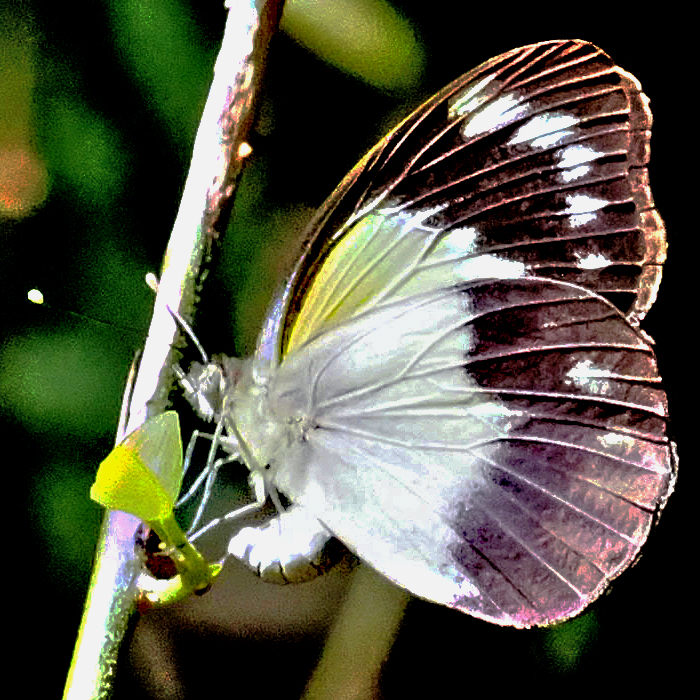
Cepora perimale scyllara ovipositing

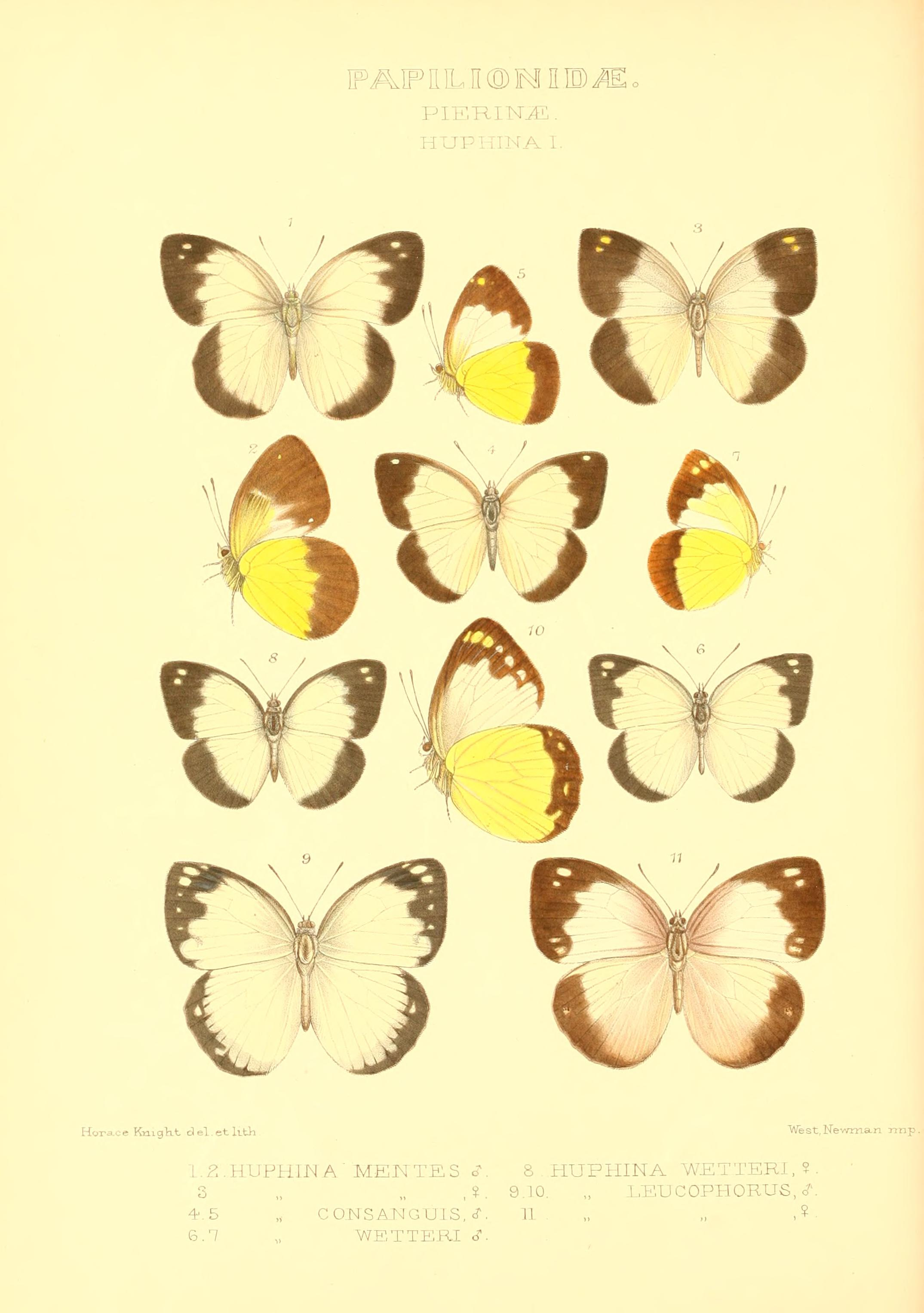
Four subspecies of Cepora perimale: C. p. mentes, C. p. consanguinea, C. p. wetterensis and C. p. leucophorus

== Subspecies ==
- C. p. perimale (Norfolk Island)
- C. p. scyllara (Macleay, 1826) - Australian gull (northern Australia to the Hunter River, New South Wales)
- C. p. pitys Godart, 1819 (Timor)
- C. p. wetterensis Grose-Smith (Wetar Island)
- C. p. mentes (Wallace, 1867) (Lombok Island)
- C. p. pygmaea Röber, 1891 (Leti Island)
- C. p. pityna Fruhstorfer, 1903 (Damar Island)
- C. p. babberica Fruhstorfer, 1903 (Babar Island)
- C. p. consanguinea Butler (Tanimber Group)
- C. p. bolana Fruhstorfer, 1903 (Kai Island)
- C. p. perictione Felder, 1865 (Aru)
- C. p. wallaceana (C. & R. Felder, 1865) (Waigeu)
- C. p. dohertyana (Grose-Smith, 1894) (West Irian to southern New Guinea)
- C. p. latilimbata (Butler, 1876) (Darnley Island, Papua)
- C. p. mithra Fruhstorfer, 1903 (Fergusson Island)
- C. p. chrysopis Fruhstorfer, 1910 (Neomfor Island, Geelvink Bay)
- C. p. leucophorus Grose-Smith, 1897 (Trobriand Islands)
- C. p. acrisa Boisduval, 1859 (New Caledonia, Loyalty Islands)
- C. p. quadricolor (Godman & Salvin, 1877) (New Britain, New Ireland, New Hanover, Duke of York Group)
- C. p. agnata Grose-Smith, 1889 (Guadalcanal, Roviana)
- C. p. discolor Mathew, 1887 (Ugi, Ulana Islands)
- C. p. macdonaldi (Ribbe, 1898) (Bougainville)
- C. p. maculata Grose-Smith, 1896 (New Britain)
- C. p. radiata Howarth, 1962 (Bellona Island, Somonons)
