= Plum pine =

Plum pine may refer to:

- Podocarpus coriaceus, the yucca plum pine
- Podocarpus elatus, the Illawarra plum, or the plum pine
- Podocarpus lawrencei, the mountain plum-pine
- Podocarpus macrophyllus, the yew plum pine
- Podocarpus spinulosus, the dwarf plum pine
