= Native species =

Species indigenous to a given area in geologic time

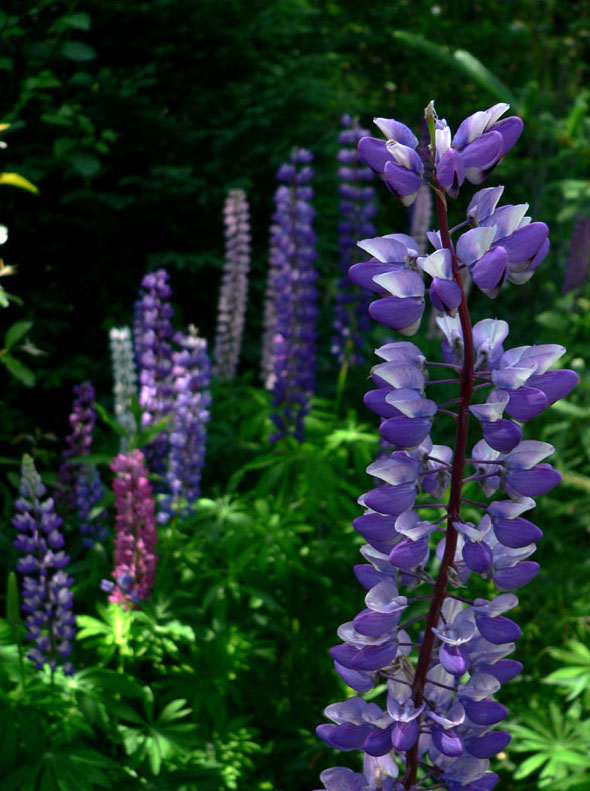
Large-leaved lupine (Lupinus polyphyllus): native to western North America but introduced and invasive in several areas worldwide

In biogeography, a native species is indigenous to a given region or ecosystem if its presence in that region is the result of only local natural evolution (though often popularised as "with no human intervention") during history. The term is equivalent to the concept of indigenous or autochthonous species.

A wild organism (as opposed to a domesticated organism) is known as an introduced species within the regions where it was anthropogenically introduced. If an introduced species causes substantial ecological, environmental or economic damage, it may be regarded more specifically as an invasive species.

A native species in a location is not necessarily also endemic to that location. Endemic species are exclusively found in a particular place. A native species may occur in areas other than the one under consideration. The terms endemic and native also do not imply that an organism necessarily first originated or evolved where it is currently found.

== Concept ==
The notion of nativity is often a blurred concept, as it is a function of both time and political boundaries. Over long periods of time, local conditions and migratory patterns are constantly changing as tectonic plates move, join, and split. Natural climate change (which is much slower than human-caused climate change) changes sea level, ice cover, temperature, and rainfall, driving direct changes in habitability and indirect changes through the presence of predators, competitors, food sources, and even oxygen levels. Species do naturally appear, reproduce, and endure, or become extinct, and their distribution is rarely static or confined to a particular geographic location.

Moreover, the distinction between native and non-native as being tied to a local occurrence during historical times has been criticised as lacking perspective, and a case has been made for more graded categorisations such as that of prehistoric natives, which occurred in a region during prehistory but have since suffered local extinction there due to human involvement.

== Ecology ==
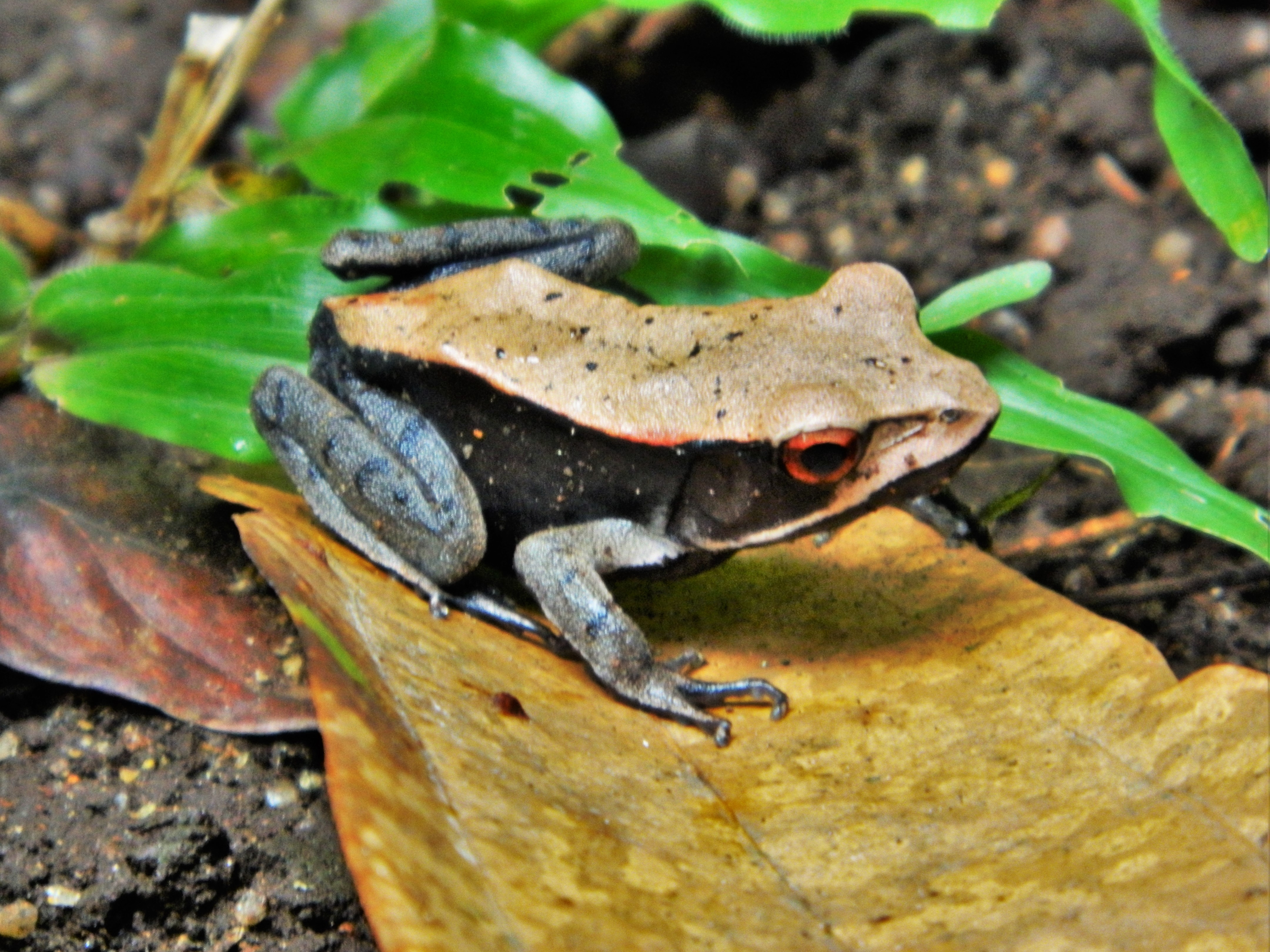
Bicolored frog (Clinotarsus curtipes) is native to the Western Ghats of India and found nowhere else (endemic)

Native species form communities and biological interactions with other specific flora, fauna, fungi, and other organisms. For example, some plant species can only reproduce with a continued mutualistic interaction with a certain animal pollinator, and the pollinating animal may also be dependent on that plant species for a food source. Many species have adapted to very limited, unusual, or harsh conditions, such as cold climates or frequent wildfires. Others can live in diverse areas or adapt well to different surroundings.

== Human impact and intervention ==
The diversity of species across many parts of the world exists only because bioregions are separated by barriers, particularly large rivers, seas, oceans, mountains, and deserts. Humans can introduce species that have never met in their evolutionary history, on varying time scales ranging from days to decades (Long, 1981; Vermeij, 1991). Humans are moving species across the globe at an unprecedented rate. Those working to address invasive species view this as an increased risk to native species.

As humans introduce species to new locations for cultivation, or transport them by accident, some of them may become invasive species, damaging native communities. Invasive species can have profound effects on ecosystems by changing ecosystem structure, function, species abundance, and community composition. Besides ecological damage, these species can also damage agriculture, infrastructure, and cultural assets. Government agencies and environmental groups are directing increasing resources to addressing these species.

== Conservation and advocacy ==
Native plant organizations such as the Society for Ecological Restoration, native plant societies, Wild Ones, and Lady Bird Johnson Wildflower Center encourage the use of native plants. The identification of local remnant natural areas provides a basis for this work.

Many books have been written on the subject of planting native plants in home gardens. The use of cultivars derived from native species is a widely disputed practice among native plant advocates.

=== Importance of nativity in conservation ===
When ecological restoration projects are undertaken to a native ecological system disturbed by economic development or other events, they may be historically inaccurate, incomplete, or pay little or no attention to ecotype accuracy or type conversions. They may fail to restore the original ecological system by overlooking the basics of remediation. Attention paid to the historical distribution of native species is a crucial first step to ensure the ecological integrity of the project.

For example, to prevent erosion of the recontoured sand dunes at the western edge of the Los Angeles International Airport in 1975, landscapers stabilized the backdunes with a "natural" seed mix (Mattoni 1989a). Unfortunately, the seed mix was representative of coastal sage scrub, an exogenous plant community, instead of the native dune scrub community. As a result, the El Segundo blue butterfly (Euphilotes allyni) became an endangered species. Its population, which had once extended over 3200 acres along the coastal dunes from Ocean Park to Malaga Cove in Palos Verdes, began to recover when the invasive California buckwheat (Eriogonum fasciculatum) was uprooted so that the butterflies' original native plant host, the dune buckwheat (Eriogonum parvifolium), could regain some of its lost habitat.

== See also ==
- List of Australian plants termed "native"
- Natural landscaping
- Rewilding
- Wildlife garden
