= Wild pomegranate =

Wild pomegranate is a common name for several plants and may refer to:

- Burchellia
- Capparis canescens
- Punica granatum
