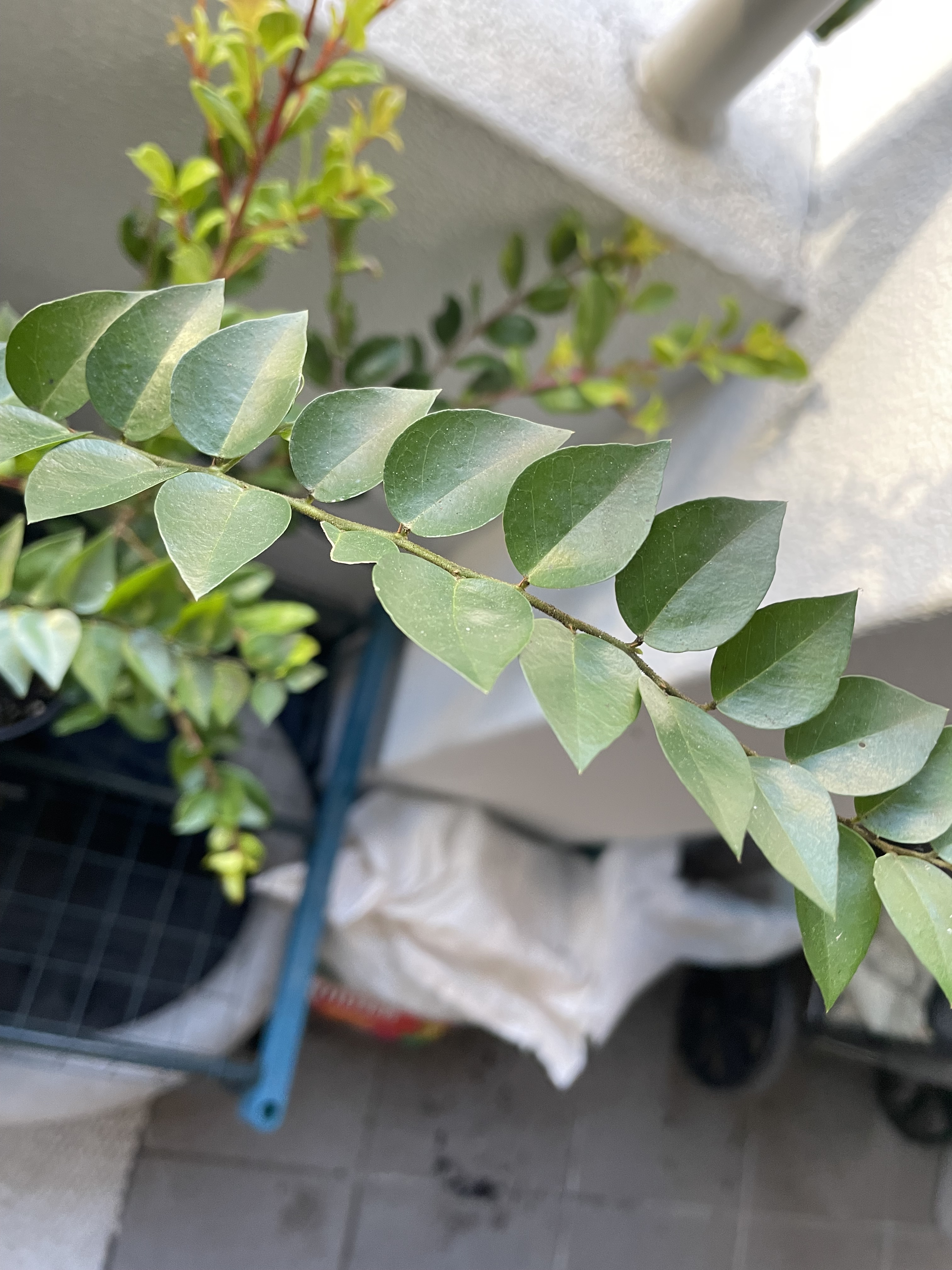

Scientific classification
- Kingdom: Plantae
- Clade: Tracheophytes
- Clade: Angiosperms
- Clade: Eudicots
- Clade: Rosids
- Order: Brassicales
- Family: Capparaceae
- Genus: Capparis
- Species: C. lucida

Binomial name
- Capparis lucida Bentham, 1863

Synonyms
- Thilachium lucidum DC. (Bentham, 1863); Busbeckea corymbiflora F.Muell. (Mueller, 1858)

= Capparis lucida =

Species of plant

Capparis lucida, commonly referred to as the coast caper, is a versatile plant that often grows as a small tree or a shrub, usually reaching heights of 3 to 4 meters. While it may sometimes climb, it typically produces flowers and fruits as a shrub. The leaves are glossy and range from 3 to 10 cm long and 2 to 5 cm wide, with a noticeable central vein and smaller veins forming loops near the edges. Both the petioles (the stalk attaching the leaf to the stem) and twigs are covered in fine, soft hairs.

The flowers of the coast caper are quite distinct, featuring sepals (the outer parts of the flower) that are 9 to 13 mm long. The outer sepals are fused into a cap-like structure that splits open unevenly, while the inner sepals remain separate. The petals are white or pale, about 15 to 20 mm long, and there are a striking number of stamens (the pollen-producing parts) — anywhere from 50 to 85. The long stalk that supports the ovary, called the gynophore, can be 25 to 65 mm long and is hairy at the base.

The fruit is a round, smooth-skinned berry, about 2.5 to 5 cm in diameter, containing many seeds. Each seed is around 6 mm long and has a unique spiraled embryo with folded cotyledons (the first leaves of the seedling).

Although this plant can host caper whites (Belenois java teutonia) and chalk whites (Elodina parthia) successfully, it is not their preferred host plant. Caper gulls (Cepora perimale scyllara) have been recorded to lay on this plant.

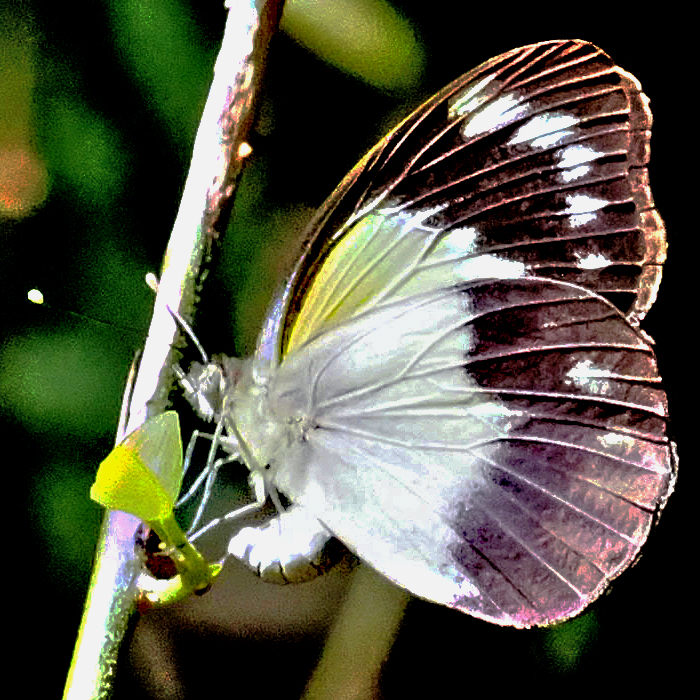
Cepora perimale on a coastal caper plant

== Seedlings ==
The young seedlings have lance-shaped cotyledons that are 22 to 30 mm long and 11 to 15 mm wide, with a pointed tip and a rounded base. By the tenth leaf stage, the leaves become more oval, and the plant develops straight, spiny stipules (small leaf-like structures) about 4 to 7 mm long. The stem is covered with tiny, translucent white hairs that are hooked at the tips. Seeds of the Coast Caper typically germinate within 19 to 32 days.

== Distribution and habitat ==
The coast caper is found in several regions across Australia, including Western Australia, Cape York Peninsula, Northeast Queensland, and Central East Queensland. Its range extends as far south as southeastern Queensland and northeastern New South Wales. The plant prefers low elevations, usually close to sea level, and is commonly seen in coastal forests, vine thickets, and monsoon forests. It's also found in Malesia, a region encompassing Malaysia, Indonesia, and surrounding islands.

== Synonyms ==
Capparis lucida has been known by several other names:

- Capparis lucida (DC.) Benth. f. lucida
- Thilachium lucidum DC.
- Busbeckea corymbiflora F.Muell.
