= Wild orange =

Wild orange is a common name for several plants bearing fruit reminiscent of oranges. They are not necessarily related to family Rutaceae (which contains true oranges). Plants called wild orange include:

- Capparis canescens - family Capparaceae, from Australia
- Capparis mitchellii - family Capparaceae, from Australia
- Several uncultivated Citrus species (family Rutaceae), particularly Citrus macroptera, from Malesia and Melanesia

== See also ==
- Osage orange (Maclura pomifera), native to the south-western United States
