= Bog onion =

Bog onion is a common name for several plants and may refer to:

- Arisaema triphyllum, a herbaceous plants native to eastern North America
- Owenia cepiodora, a tree native to Australia with onion-scented wood
