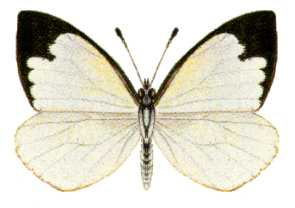

Scientific classification
- Kingdom: Animalia
- Phylum: Arthropoda
- Class: Insecta
- Order: Lepidoptera
- Family: Pieridae
- Genus: Elodina
- Species: E. padusa

Binomial name
- Elodina padusa (Hewitson, 1853)

Synonyms
- Pieris padusa Hewitson, 1853; Terias nivea Swainson, 1851 (nomen nudum); Pieris nivea Koch, 1860 (nomen nudum); Elodina quadrata Butler, 1873

= Elodina padusa =

Narrow-winged pearl white

Species of butterfly

Elodina padusa, the narrow-winged pearl white, is a butterfly in the family Pieridae. It is found across the central latitudes of Australia, including Victoria and South Australia.

The wingspan is about 40 mm. The upperside of the wings is white with black wingtips, while the undersides are white with grey wingtips.

The larvae feed on various Capparaceae species, including Capparis canescens and Capparis mitchellii. They are green with brown marks and a yellowish dorsal line. Full-grown larvae reach a length of about 20 mm. Pupation takes place in a green pupa with white marks, which is attached to a leaf of the host plant.
