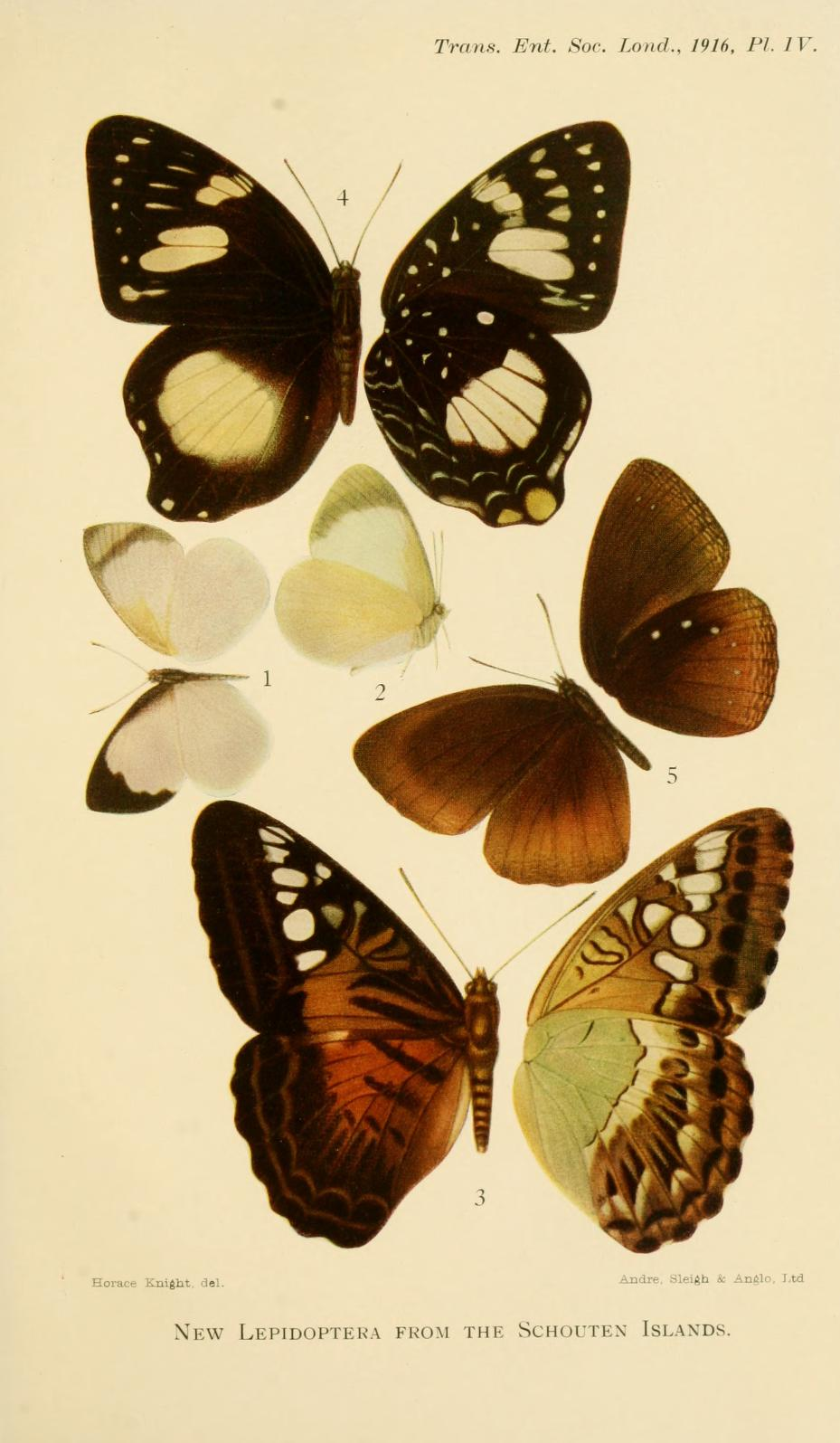
- Elodina biaka in Transactions of the Entomological Society of London (figures 1, 2)

Scientific classification
- Kingdom: Animalia
- Phylum: Arthropoda
- Class: Insecta
- Order: Lepidoptera
- Family: Pieridae
- Genus: Elodina
- Species: E. biaka

Binomial name
- Elodina biaka Joicey & Noakes, 1915

= Elodina biaka =

Species of butterfly

Elodina biaka is a butterfly in the family Pieridae. It was described by James John Joicey and Alfred Noakes in 1915. It is endemic to Biak in the Australasian realm.
