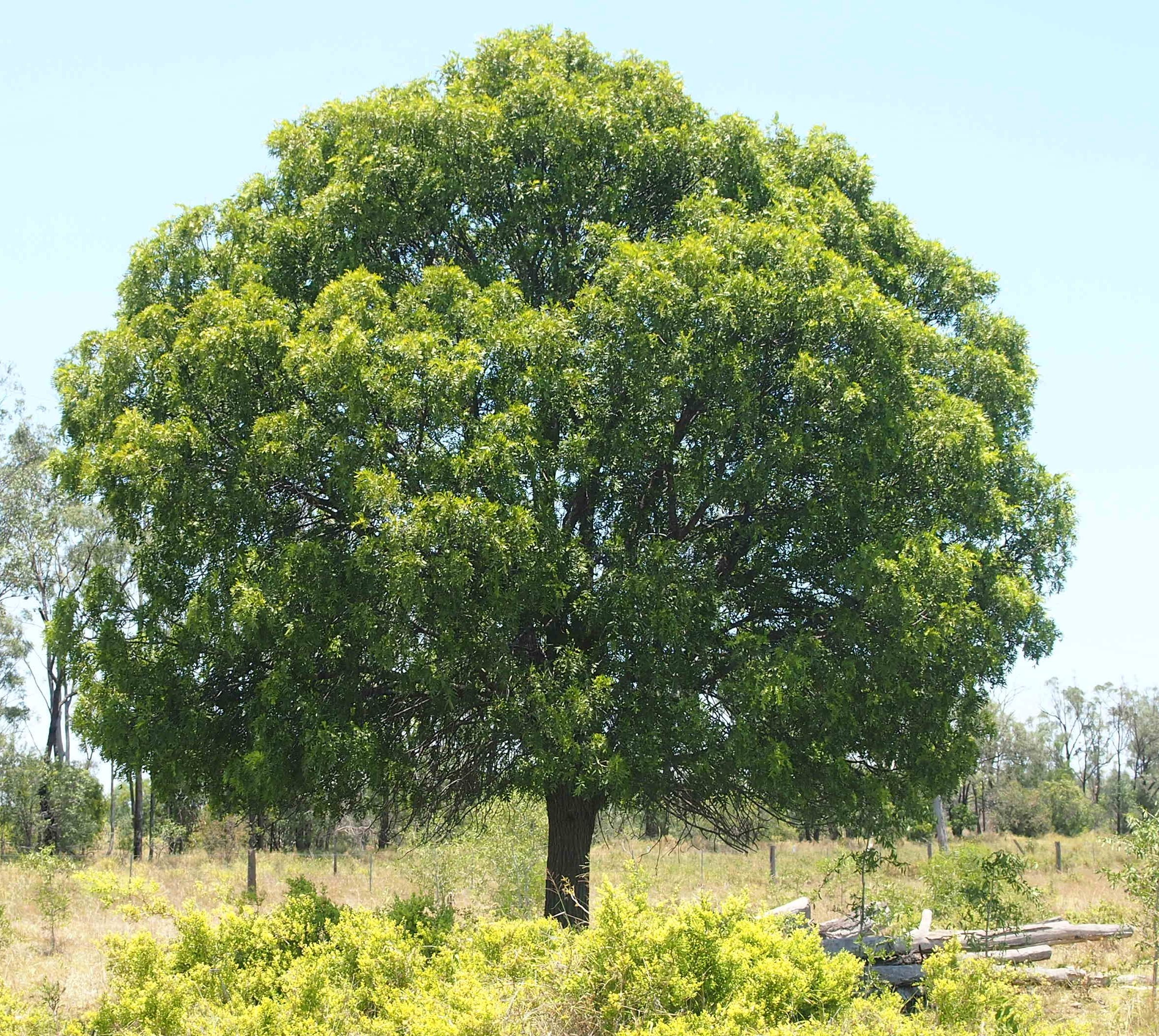
- Owenia acidula

Scientific classification
- Kingdom: Plantae
- Clade: Embryophytes
- Clade: Tracheophytes
- Clade: Spermatophytes
- Clade: Angiosperms
- Clade: Eudicots
- Clade: Rosids
- Order: Sapindales
- Family: Meliaceae
- Subfamily: Melioideae
- Genus: Owenia; F.Muell.

= Owenia (plant) =

Genus of trees

Owenia is a genus of plants, mainly trees in the family Meliaceae. They are dioecious, with male and female flowers on separate plants. They are endemic to Australia and fairly widespread across the continent. There are five species in the genus, living in conditions ranging from wet rainforest to the verges of the desert.

One species, Owenia cepiodora, is rare, and is renowned for having freshly cut bark that smells of onions. Its common name is onion cedar or bog onion.

The species recognised at the Australian Plant Census include

- Owenia acidula
- Owenia cepiodora
- Owenia reliqua
- Owenia reticulata
- Owenia vernicosa
