= Owenia vernicosa =

Scientific classification
- Kingdom: Plantae
- Clade: Embryophytes
- Clade: Tracheophytes
- Clade: Spermatophytes
- Clade: Angiosperms
- Clade: Eudicots
- Clade: Rosids
- Order: Sapindales
- Family: Meliaceae
- Genus: Owenia
- Species: O. vernicosa

Binomial name
- Owenia vernicosa F.Muell.

Species of tree

Owenia vernicosa, the emu apple, is a species of tree found in the north of Australia. The bark is an orange-grey colour that flakes away from the trunk. Deep red fruit appear after the flowering period, when the white, cream and green inflorescence appears in October to November. The tree occurs on alluvial sand or black and loamy clays over sandstone. The habitat may be rocky ridge lines and slopes or alongside creeks.

== Uses ==
Indigenous Australians pulverized the inner bark of this species and added it to small water bodies to act as a fish toxin, allowing fish to be easily collected from the surface of the water.

Indigenous Australians boiled the inner bark of this species in water and the resulting liquid was used as an antiseptic wash for open cuts and sores.

Emus are known to consume the fruit of this species.

Red-tailed black cockatoos likely consume the fruit of this species, as indicated by the meaning of indigenous language words for this species.

Sugar gliders are known to consume the sap of this species.
