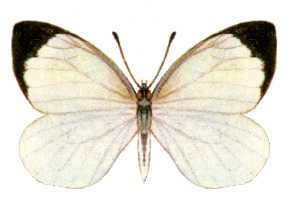

Scientific classification
- Kingdom: Animalia
- Phylum: Arthropoda
- Class: Insecta
- Order: Lepidoptera
- Family: Pieridae
- Genus: Elodina
- Species: E. perdita

Binomial name
- Elodina perdita Miskin, 1889

= Elodina perdita =

Species of butterfly

Elodina perdita, the northern pearl white or delicate pearl white, is a butterfly in the family Pieridae. It is found in the tropical north of Queensland, Australia.

The wingspan is about 40 mm.

The larvae feed on Capparis sepiaria.
