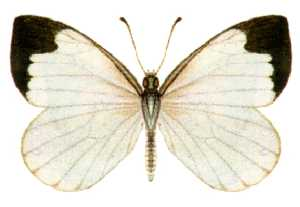
- Elodina angulipennis

Scientific classification
- Kingdom: Animalia
- Phylum: Arthropoda
- Clade: Pancrustacea
- Class: Insecta
- Order: Lepidoptera
- Family: Pieridae
- Tribe: Elodinini; Braby, 2014
- Genus: Elodina; C. & R. Felder, [1865]

Species
- See text

Synonyms
- Parelodina Fruhstorfer, 1910; Elodinesthes Fruhstorfer, 1914; Metelodina Seitz, [1927]

= Elodina =

Butterfly genus in family Pieridae

Elodina is a genus of butterflies in the family Pieridae. It is the only genus of the tribe Elodinini. It contains about 30 species.

== Species ==
- Elodina andropis Butler, 1876 New Guinea
- Elodina angulipennis (Lucas, 1852)
- Elodina anticyra (Fruhstorfer, 1910) New Guinea Roon Island and Neomfoor Island
- Elodina argypheus Grose-Smith, 1890 Guadalcanal, Solomon Islands
- Elodina aruensis Joicey & Talbot, 1922 Aru Islands, Moluccas, Indonesia
- Elodina biaka Joicey & Noakes, 1915
- Elodina claudia De Baar & Hancock, 1993 Australia
- Elodina denita Joicey & Talbot, 1916 (or Elodina definita) Papua
- Elodina dispar Röber, 1887 Sulawesi
- Elodina effeminata (Fruhstorfer, 1910) New Guinea
- Elodina egnatia Godart Ambon, Serang, Sulawesi
- Elodina hypatia (C. & R. Felder, 1865) New Guinea
- Elodina invisiblis Fruhstorfer Moluccas, Indonesia
- Elodina leefmansi Kalis, 1933 Java
- Elodina namatia Fruhstorfer, 1910 Waigeu, Indonesia
- Elodina padusa (Hewitson, 1853)
- Elodina parthia (Hewitson, 1853)
- Elodina perdita Miskin, 1889
- Elodina primularis Butler, 1882 New Ireland, Duke of York. Island., New Britain
- Elodina pseudanops Butler, 1882 New Caledonia
- Elodina pura Grose-Smith, 1895 Pura Island, Lesser Sundas, Indonesia
- Elodina queenslandica De Baar & Hancock, 1993 Queensland
- Elodina signata Wallace, 1867 New Caledonia
- Elodina sota Eliot, 1956 Sulawesi
- Elodina therasia C. & R. Felder, [1865] Sulawesi
- Elodina tongura Tindale, 1923 Groote Eylandt, Australia
- Elodina umbratica Grose-Smith, 1889 Solomon Islands
- Elodina velleda Felder “Australasia”
- Elodina walkeri Butler, 1898 Australia
