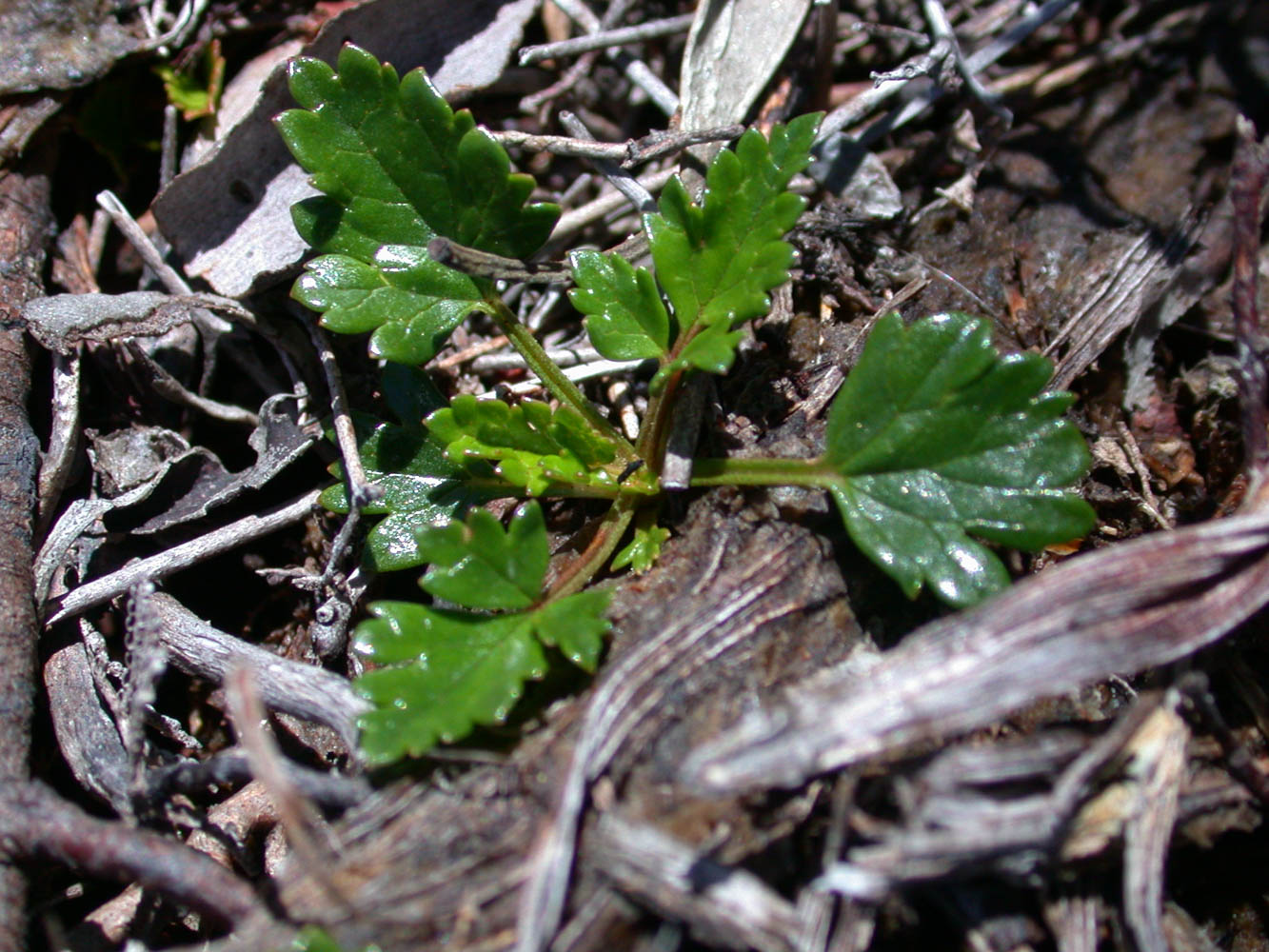
- Photo courtesy of R. Wiltshire

Scientific classification
- Kingdom: Plantae
- Clade: Embryophytes
- Clade: Tracheophytes
- Clade: Spermatophytes
- Clade: Angiosperms
- Clade: Eudicots
- Clade: Rosids
- Order: Rosales
- Family: Rosaceae
- Genus: Rubus
- Subgenus: R. subg. Diemenicus
- Species: R. gunnianus

Binomial name
- Rubus gunnianus Hook.

= Rubus gunnianus =

Species of herb

Rubus gunnianus, commonly known as the native strawberry or Tasmanian alpine raspberry, is a species of bramble in the rose family. It is a small herb that grows in Tasmania and bears edible fruit.

== Taxonomy ==
The name gunnianus comes from the botanist Ronald Campbell Gunn. Gunn worked closely with Ronald Lawrence; who knew British botanist Joseph Hooker. The authority of this species was named after Hooker. Gunn travelled around Tasmania, collecting specimens and sending them back for Hooker's book Flora Tasmaniae.

== Description ==
Rubus gunnianus is the smallest of all the species in the family Rosaceae. It grows as a small, prostrate herb. When mature, the plant can spread by sending out runners to make the plant larger, as well as by setting seed. Unlike other Rubus species, the plant does not have any thorns or spines. The leaves grow out from the stem as a florette, and are triangular and glossy green. The palmately compound leaves are composed of three pinnatipartite leaflets (one main one flanked by two smaller ones either side), with very long petioles.

The species is monoecious (having both male and female organs on the same flower), and the flowers are small, white, with five petals. The fruit is made up of a few red drupes, resembling a raspberry.

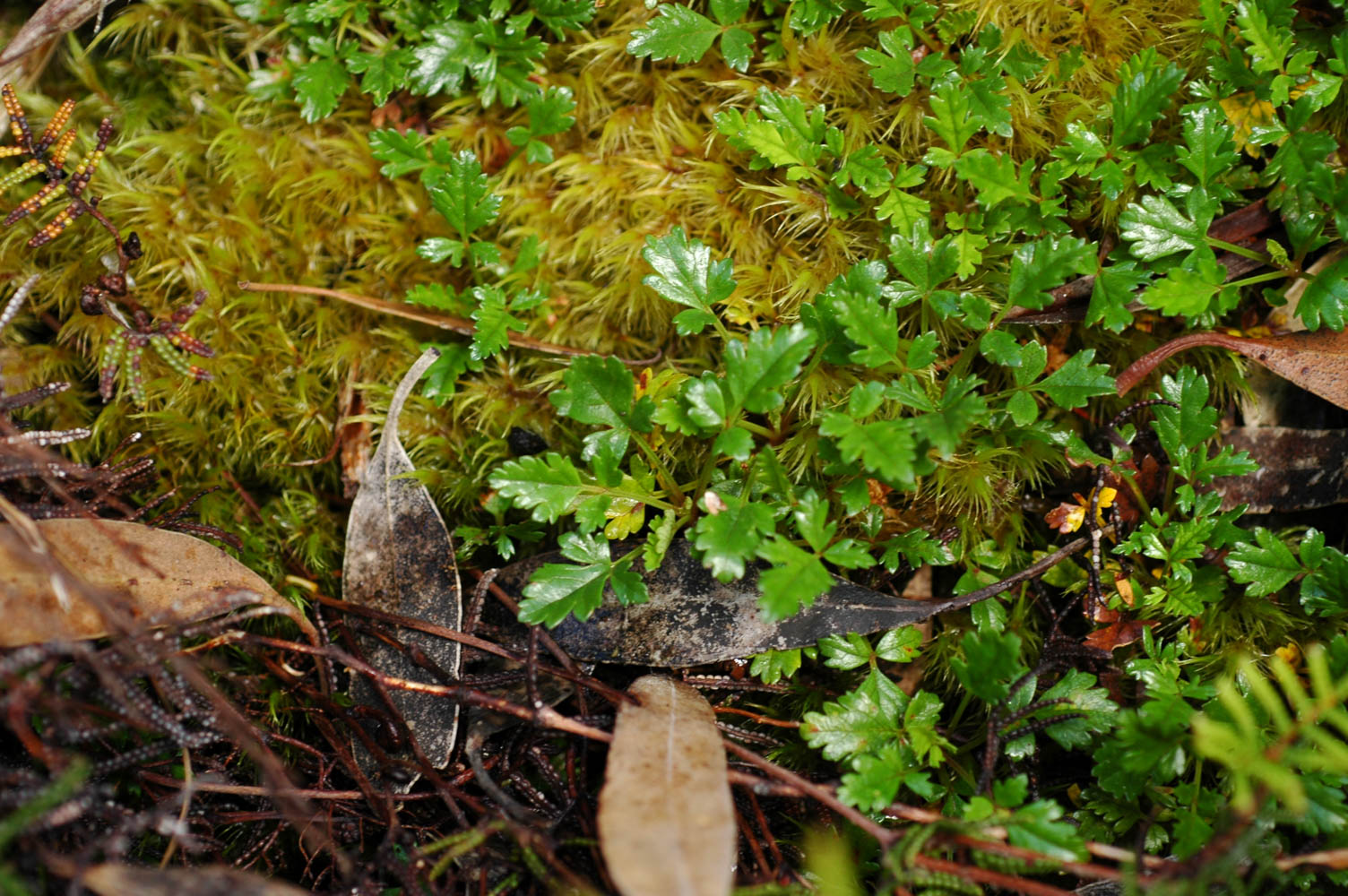
Rubus gunnianus specimen

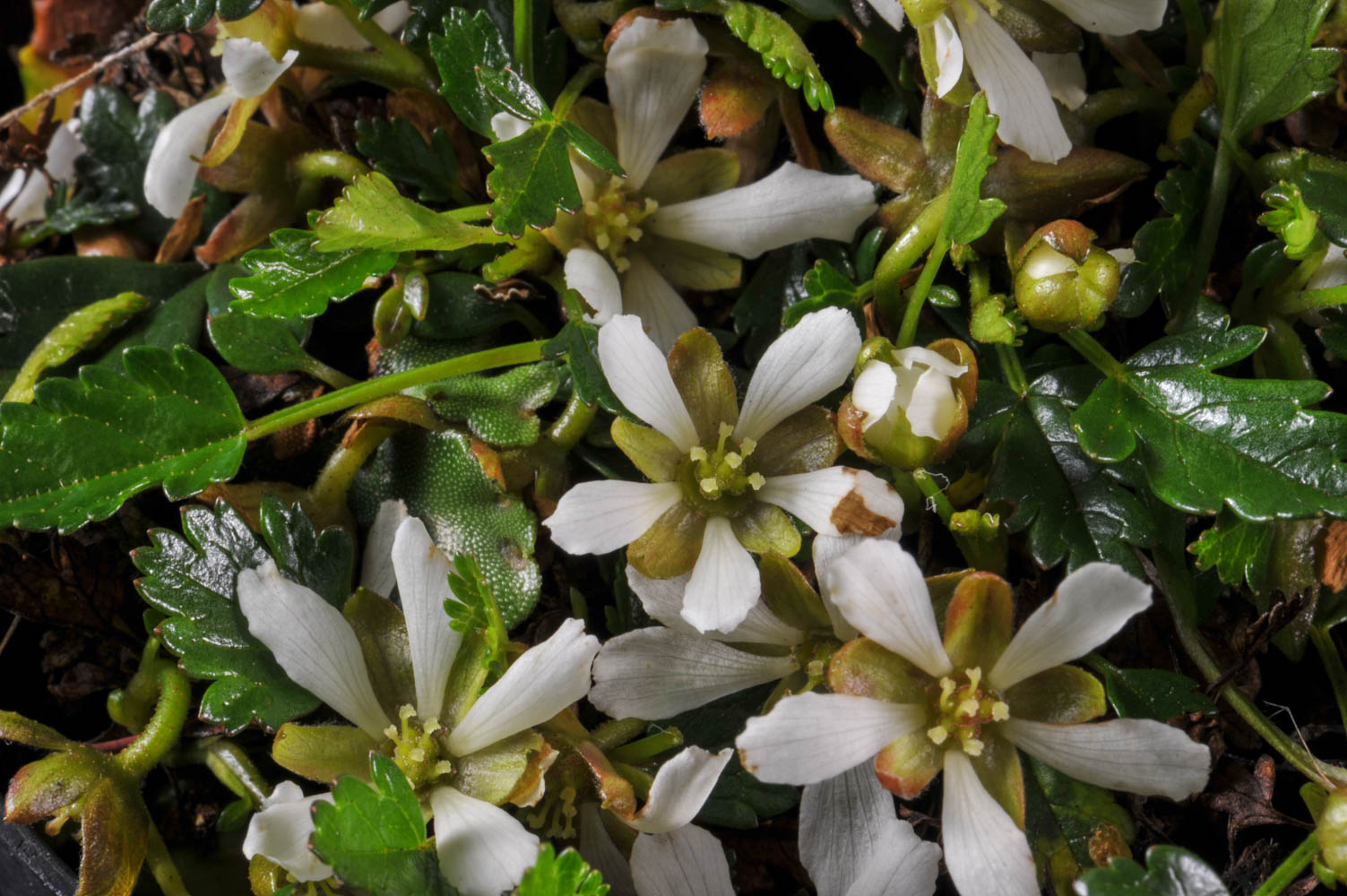
Flowers and buds

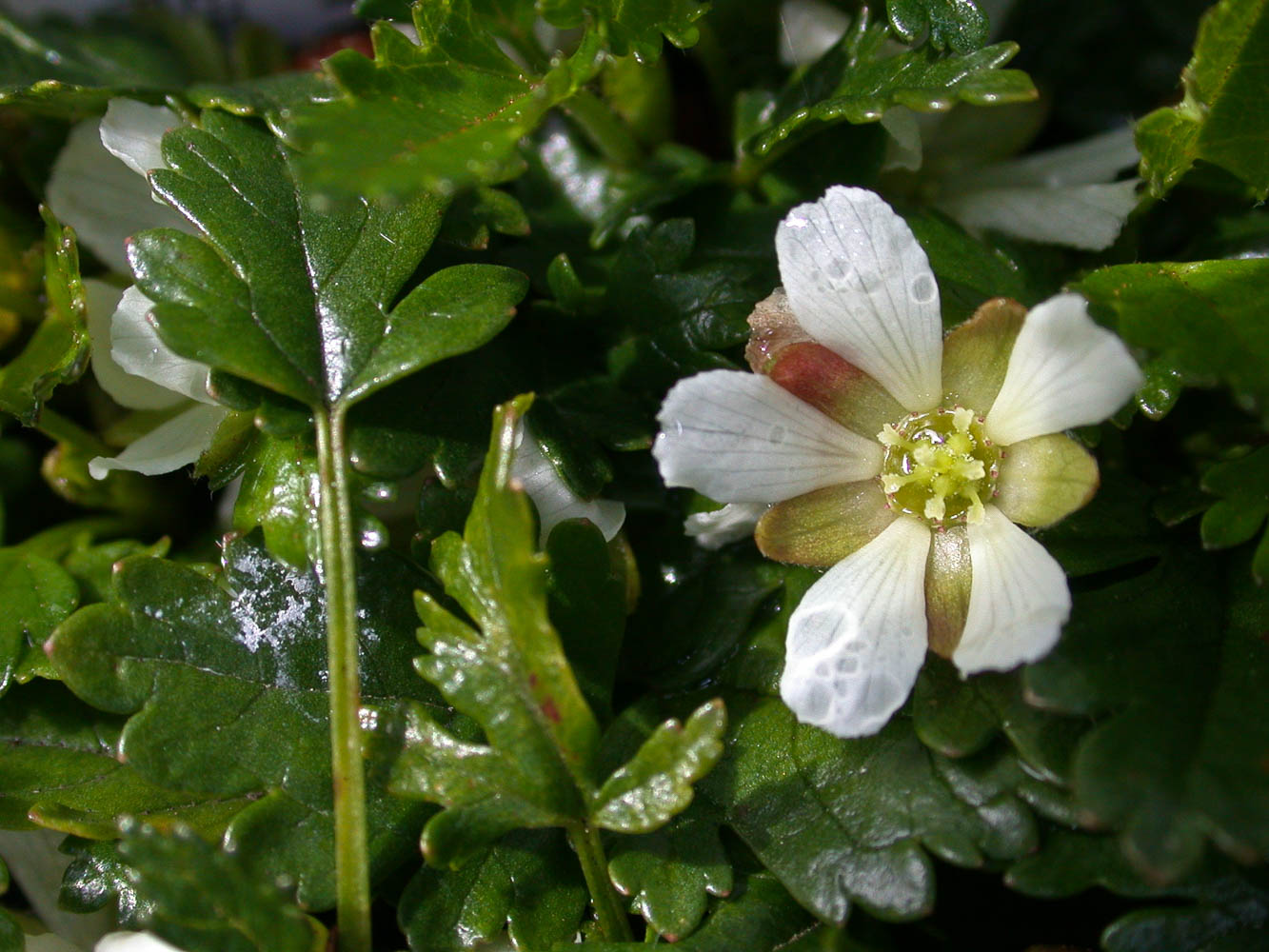
Flower close-up

== Distribution and habitat ==
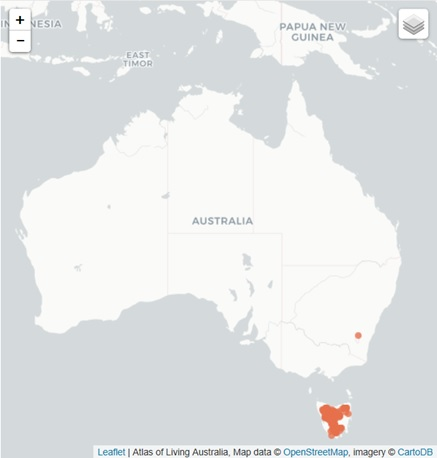
Distribution map from the Atlas of Living Australia

Rubus gunnianus is found across Tasmania in mountainous areas such as alpine moorlands, and subalpine woodlands over 900 metres (3,000 ft) above sea level. This includes areas such as the Central Coast, Derwent Valley, Hobart, Huon Valley, and the West Coast.

It is frost hardy, which is essential to alpine environments, due to the harsh weather and exposed conditions at high altitude. It prefers moist, sheltered areas among mosses and leaf litter, where it can survive the harsh conditions of alpine areas, but it can also survive in semi-exposed areas.

== Conservation status ==
As of 1997, the species had not yet been assessed for the IUCN Red List, but was quite common in alpine habitats throughout Tasmania, posing no conservation concern.

== Uses ==
The fruit is edible. A purple dye can be made from the fruit juice. Members of the genus Rubus are well known for their nutritional benefits of being high in vitamins and nutrients such as vitamin C, potassium, magnesium, iron and copper, while being low in sugar.

This species is suitable for domestic cultivation and may be a good choice for people with limited space to grow plants, because it is quite small. It can also be grown in pots. It requires well-drained moist soils, part shade to full sun, and is suitable in a variety of soil types in alpine and subalpine areas.

Members of Rosaceae are well known for producing edible fruit, which is suitable for bush tucker.
