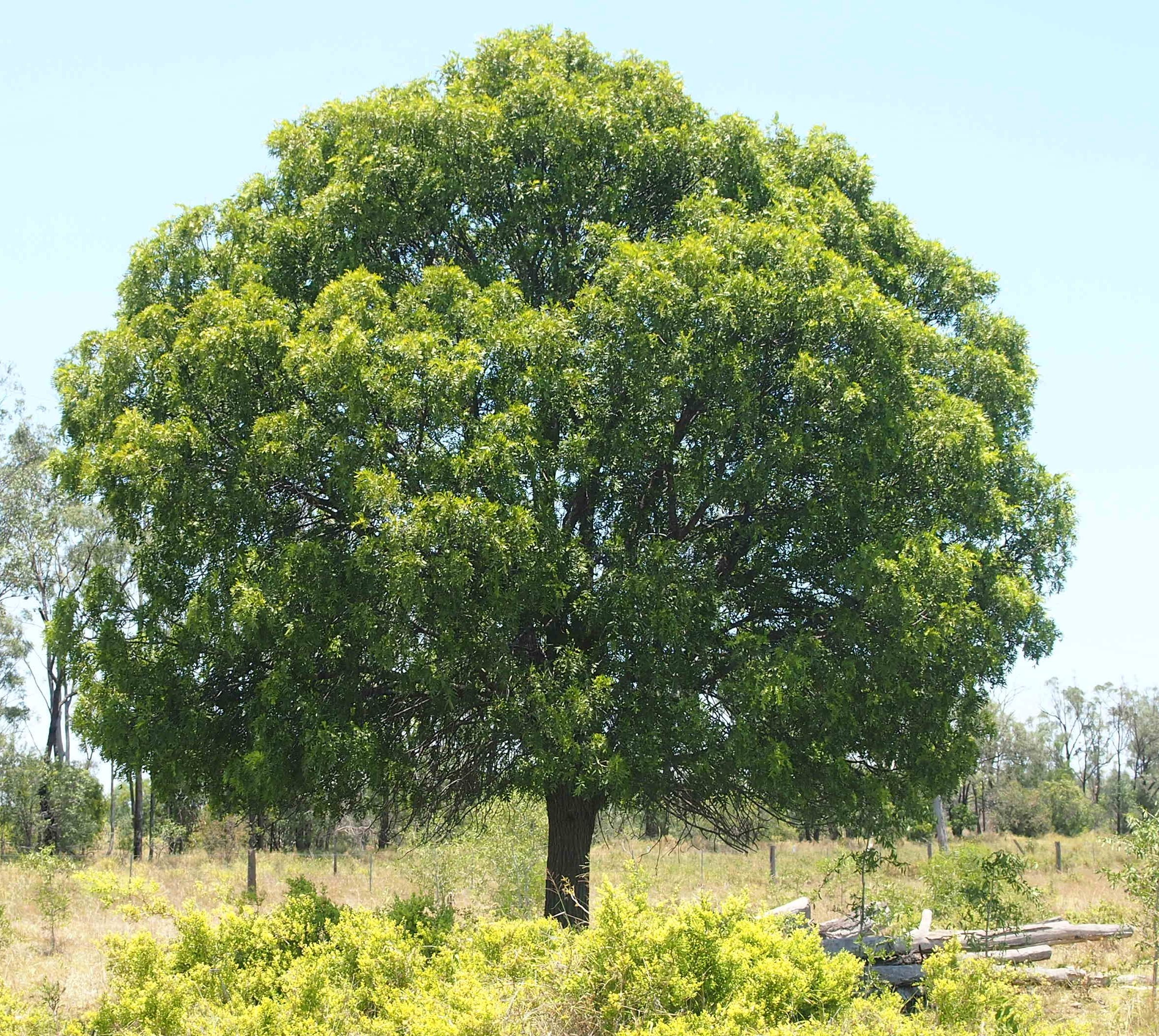

Scientific classification
- Kingdom: Plantae
- Clade: Tracheophytes
- Clade: Angiosperms
- Clade: Eudicots
- Clade: Rosids
- Order: Sapindales
- Family: Meliaceae
- Genus: Owenia
- Species: O. acidula

Binomial name
- Owenia acidula F.Muell.
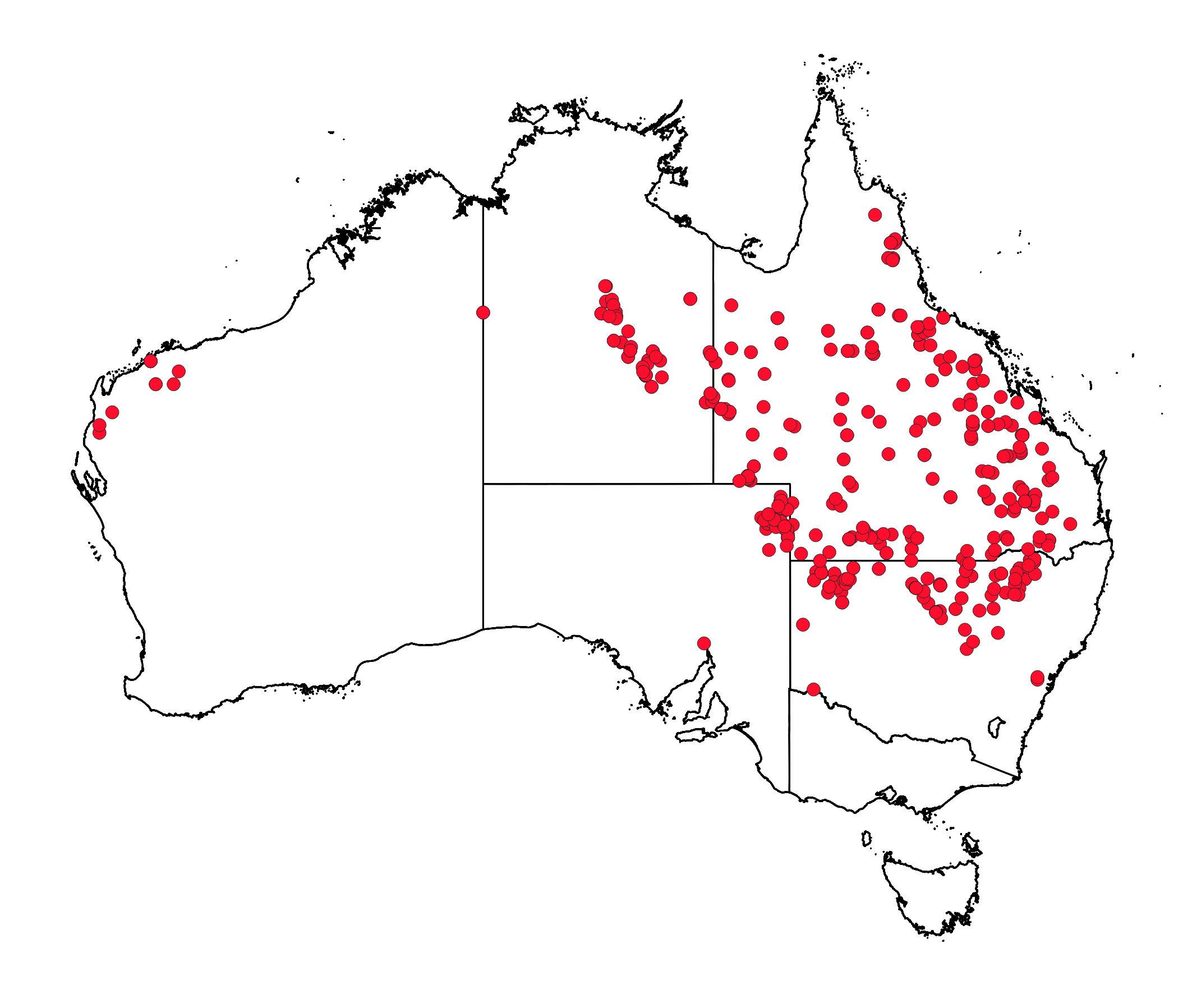
- Occurrence data from AVH

= Owenia acidula =

Species of tree

Owenia acidula, commonly known as emu apple, is a small to medium-sized Australian native tree that can be found in South Australia, Queensland, New South Wales and to a lesser extent, Western Australia and the Northern Territory. This species favours sandy soil, and is typically found on plains or in dry sclerophyll forest.

== Taxonomy ==
A total of 11 genera and 33 species of the family Meliaceae can be found in Australia, with genera Owenia and Synoum being endemic to Australia. In Queensland, Owenia venosa has been recorded alongside Owenia acidula.The colour and number of leaflets per leaf is used to distinguish these two species apart, with O. venosa presenting three or four pairs of dark green leaflets per leaf, and O. acidula possessing seven or more pairs of light green leaflets per leaf. O. venosa tends to sucker and appears to be restricted to the south-east of Queensland, while O. acidula does sucker and has a wide distribution across Queensland.

== Etymology and naming ==
Owenia acidula derives its name from Sir Richard Owen (Owenia) and the Latin name, acidula meaning a little sour. Sir Richard Owen was a 19th-century scientist who contributed significantly to the field of palaeontology and wrote multiple papers on Australian mammal fossils

== Description ==
Owenia acidula can grow from three up to ten metres tall. The branches typically hang downwards and away from the trunk. When the twigs are broken, they ooze a sticky, milky sap.

The hairless pinnate leaves are a vibrant green, two to five centimetres in length, with a shiny coating.

The buds of O. acidula are viscous. The cream coloured flowers have a loosely arranged structure, with four millimetre long petals and three millimetre long stamen.

Owenia acidula fruits prolifically. The fruit ripens after it falls off the tree, and is slightly sour in taste. The fruits are a purplish red in colour, with faded speckles, and is spherical in shape. The seeds of the fruit have a diameter of two to four centimetres, and contain chemical compounds which have also have been found in the timber of Aglaia ferruginea, including a simple limonoid and a derivative of the cyclopropane protolimonoid glabretal.

== Reproduction ==
Owenia acidula is dioecious. A plant is classified as dioecious when the male and female reproductive units develop on completely different organisms. Therefore, a male and female O. acidula specimen is required for reproduction to occur.

== Conservation status ==
As there is not enough data for O. acidula to be classified as endangered, therefore, it is currently classified as poorly known species, least concern (LC). More surveys need to be undertaken before this species can be reclassified.

== Uses ==
The fruit of O. acidula can be eaten, and the pulp is an Aboriginal bushfood which is believed to cause hallucinations.

The leaves and branches are sometimes used as stock fodder. In goats, O. acidula has a high level of digestibility of 53.29%, making it a favourable forage resource for goat producers.

The seed of Owenia acidula is commonly requested for coal mine rehabilitation.

== Gallery ==
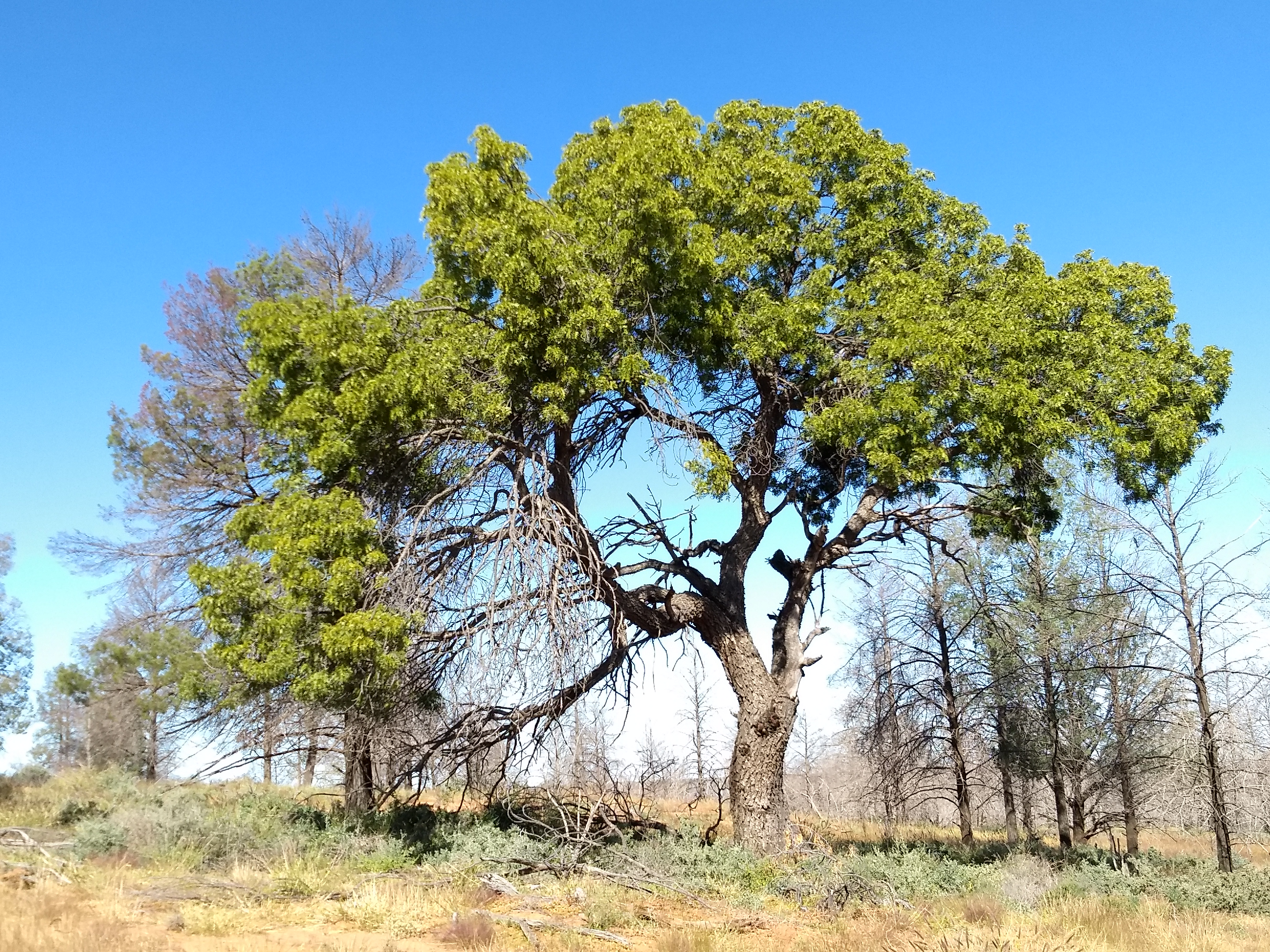
Mature Owenia acidula tree

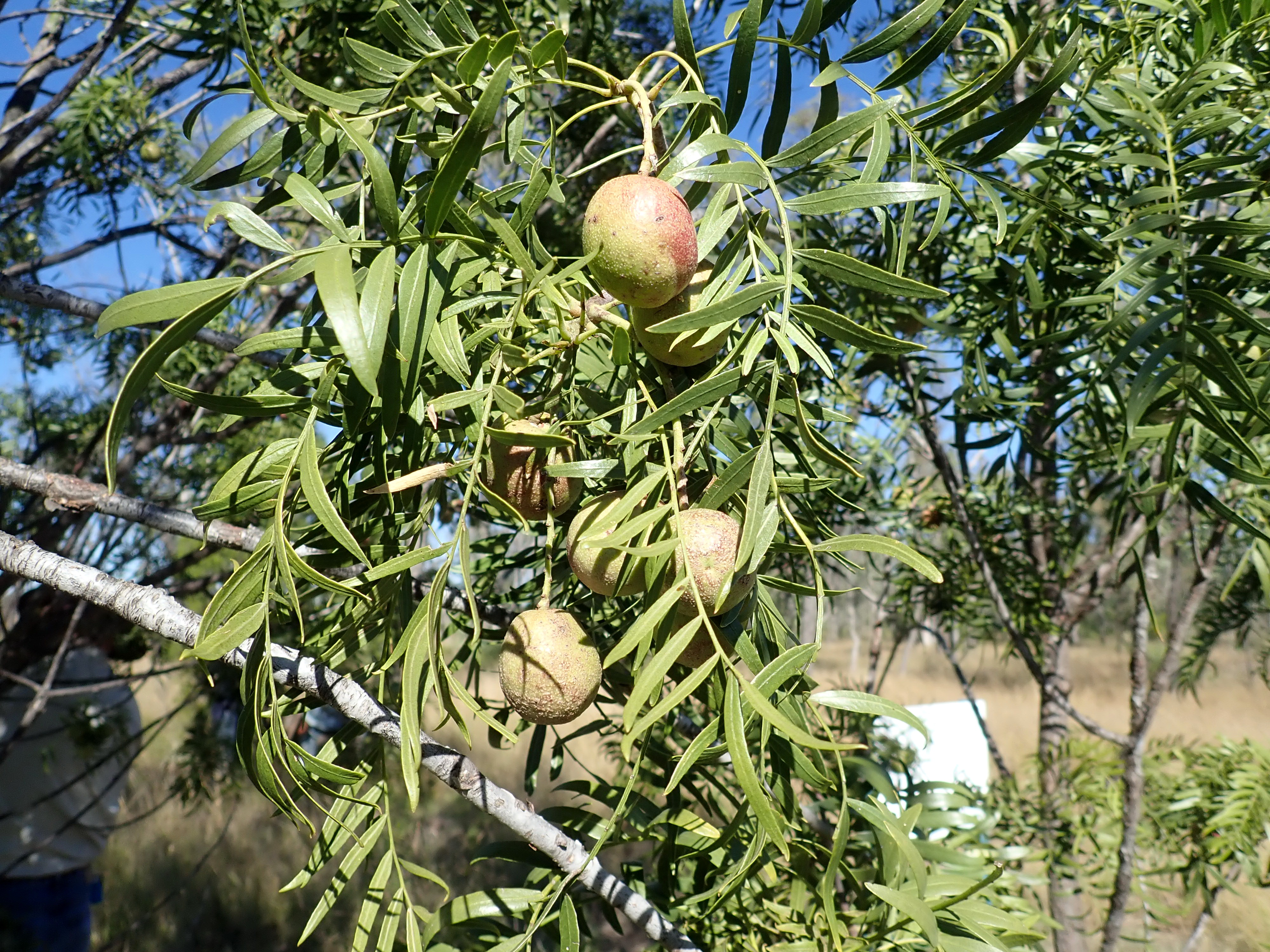
Fruit and leaves
