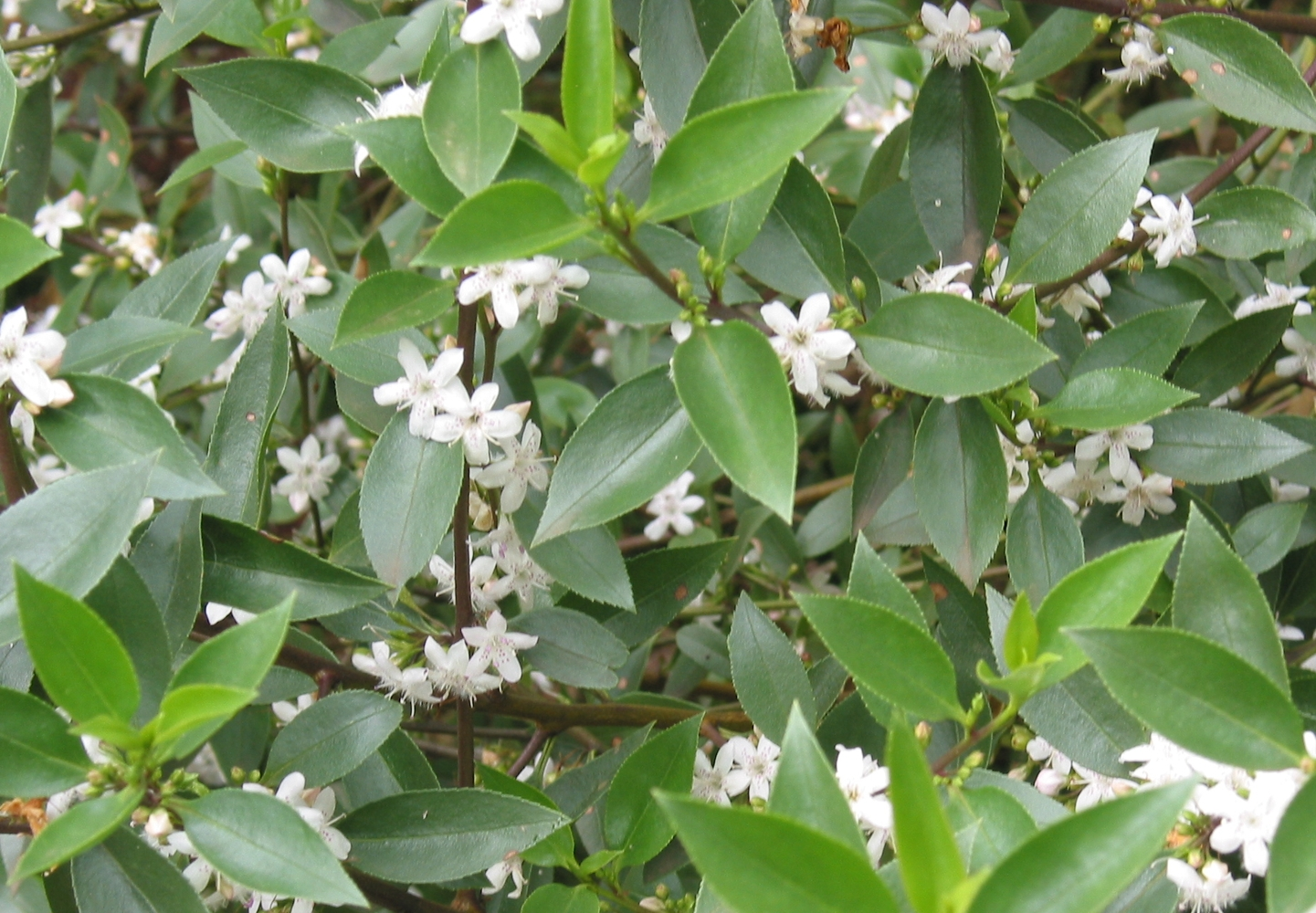

Scientific classification
- Kingdom: Plantae
- Clade: Tracheophytes
- Clade: Angiosperms
- Clade: Eudicots
- Clade: Asterids
- Order: Lamiales
- Family: Scrophulariaceae
- Genus: Myoporum
- Species: M. petiolatum

Binomial name
- Myoporum petiolatum Chinnock

= Myoporum petiolatum =

Sticky boobialla

Species of plant

Myoporum petiolatum, commonly known as sticky boobialla, is a plant in the figwort family Scrophulariaceae, and is endemic to the south-east of continental Australia. For many years this species has been confused with the much less common species Myoporum viscosum from which it can be distinguished by its thinner, noticeably petiolate and non-odorous leaves.

== Description ==
Myoporum petiolatum is a shrub which usually grows to between 0.5 and 2.0 metres (2 and 7 ft) in height. Its leaves are arranged alternately and have a distinct petiole 5–13 millimetres (0.2–0.5 in) long. The leaves are mostly 30–63 millimetres (1–2 in) long, 10–27 millimetres (0.4–1 in) wide, elliptic to egg-shaped and with the upper surface dark green and shiny compared to the lighter lower surface. The leaf margins have tiny serrations.

The flowers are borne in leaf axils in clusters of 2 to 5 on stalks 4.6–8 millimetres (0.2–0.3 in) long. There are 5 narrow triangular sepals and 5 petals forming a tube with spreading lobes on the end. The petals are white with a slight lilac flush and purple spots on the lobes and in the tube. The tube is 3–4.5 millimetres (0.1–0.2 in) long and the lobes are 4.4–6.7 millimetres (0.2–0.3 in) long. The fruit is a succulent, rounded, yellow-green drupe about 5 millimetres (0.2 in) in diameter.

== Taxonomy and naming ==
Myoporum petiolatum was first formally described by taxonomist Bob Chinnock in Eremophila and allied genera: a monograph of the plant family Myoporaceae in 2007 from a specimen collected in the Waitpinga Conservation Park. The specific epithet is from the Latin petiolatum, 'with a petiole', referring to the leaves.

== Distribution and habitat ==
Myoporum petiolatum occurs in South Australia and Victoria. It is found in and between the Flinders Ranges, the Mount Lofty Ranges, Kangaroo Island and the ranges around Melbourne. It often grows in exposed parts of woodland.
