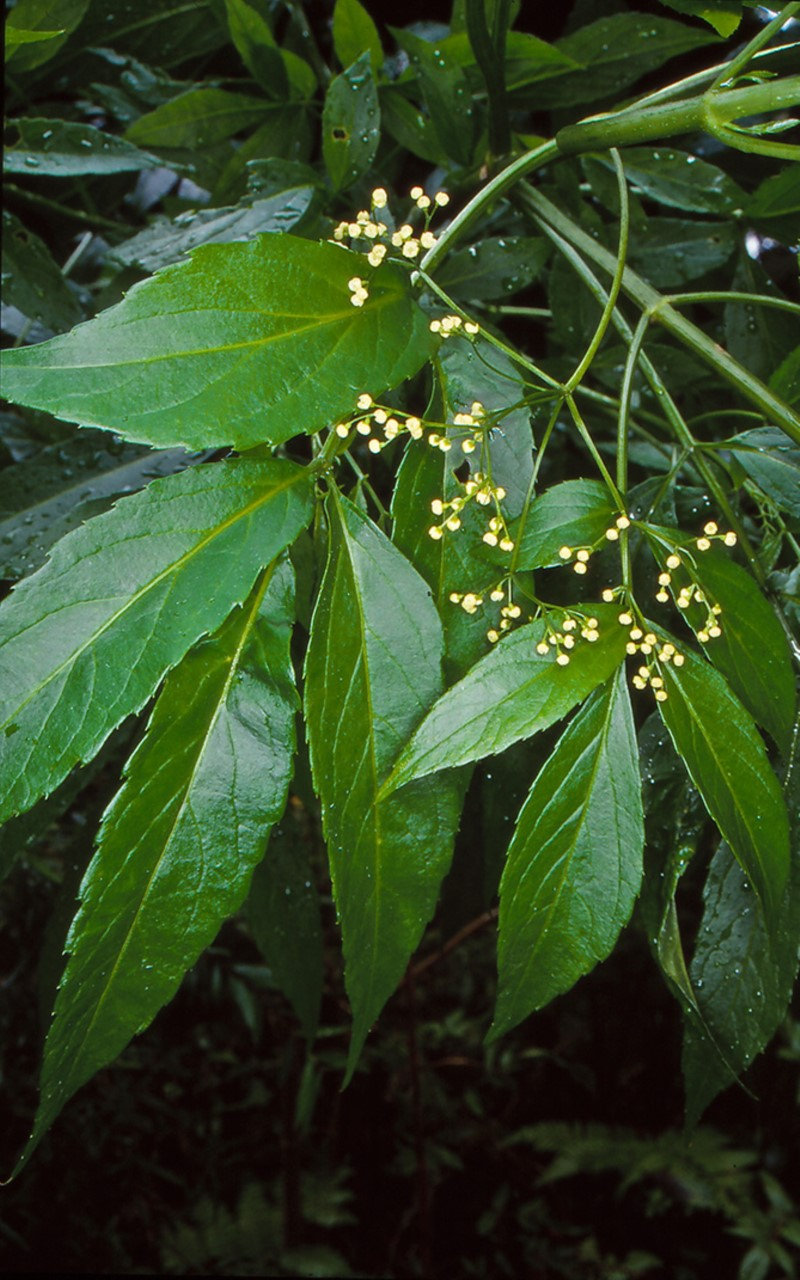
- In Budawang National Park

Scientific classification
- Kingdom: Plantae
- Clade: Embryophytes
- Clade: Tracheophytes
- Clade: Spermatophytes
- Clade: Angiosperms
- Clade: Eudicots
- Clade: Asterids
- Order: Dipsacales
- Family: Viburnaceae
- Genus: Sambucus
- Species: S. australasica

Binomial name
- Sambucus australasica (Lindl.) Fritsch

Synonyms
- Tripetelus australasicus Lindl.; Sambucus xanthocarpa F.Muell.

= Sambucus australasica =

Species of flowering plant

Sambucus australasica, commonly known as yellow elderberry, native elderberry or native elder, is a species of flowering plant in the family Viburnaceae and is endemic to eastern Australia. It is a shrub or small tree with pinnate leaves that have coarse teeth on their edges, small white flowers with three petals, and yellow fruit. It is usually found in and on the edges of rainforest.

== Description ==
Sambucus australasica is a shrub or small tree that typically grows to a height of 4 m (13 ft) and has glabrous stems, leaves and flowers. The leaves are pinnate, 60–250 mm (2.4–9.8 in) long on a petiole 20–100 mm (0.79–3.94 in) long, with three or five leaflets, each narrow elliptic to lance-shaped with the narrower end towards the base, 20–100 mm (0.79–3.94 in) long and 4–30 mm (0.16–1.18 in) wide with coarsely-toothed edges on a petiolule 2–5 mm (0.079–0.197 in) long. The flowers are sweetly scented and are arranged in groups 100–200 mm (3.9–7.9 in) in diameter, the flowers with three white petals about 3 mm (0.12 in) long. Flowering occurs from October to March and the fruit is an oval to spherical yellow drupe about 5 mm (0.20 in) in diameter.

== Taxonomy ==
Yellow elderberry was first formally described in 1838 by John Lindley who gave it the name Tripetelus australasicus and published the description in Thomas Mitchell's book, Three Expeditions into the interior of Eastern Australia. In 1891, Karl Fritsch changed the name to Sambucus australasica in Adolf Engler and Karl Anton Prantl's book Die Natürlichen Pflanzenfamilien.

== Distribution and habitat ==
Sambucus australasica is widespread in coastal districts of Queensland and New South Wales and inland to Rylstone and Tamworth, but is rare in Victoria where it only occurs in the far north east of the state. It mostly only grows in and on the edges of rainforest.
