= Leucopogon capitellatus =

Scientific classification
- Kingdom: Plantae
- Clade: Tracheophytes
- Clade: Angiosperms
- Clade: Eudicots
- Clade: Asterids
- Order: Ericales
- Family: Ericaceae
- Genus: Leucopogon
- Species: L. capitellatus

Binomial name
- Leucopogon capitellatus DC.
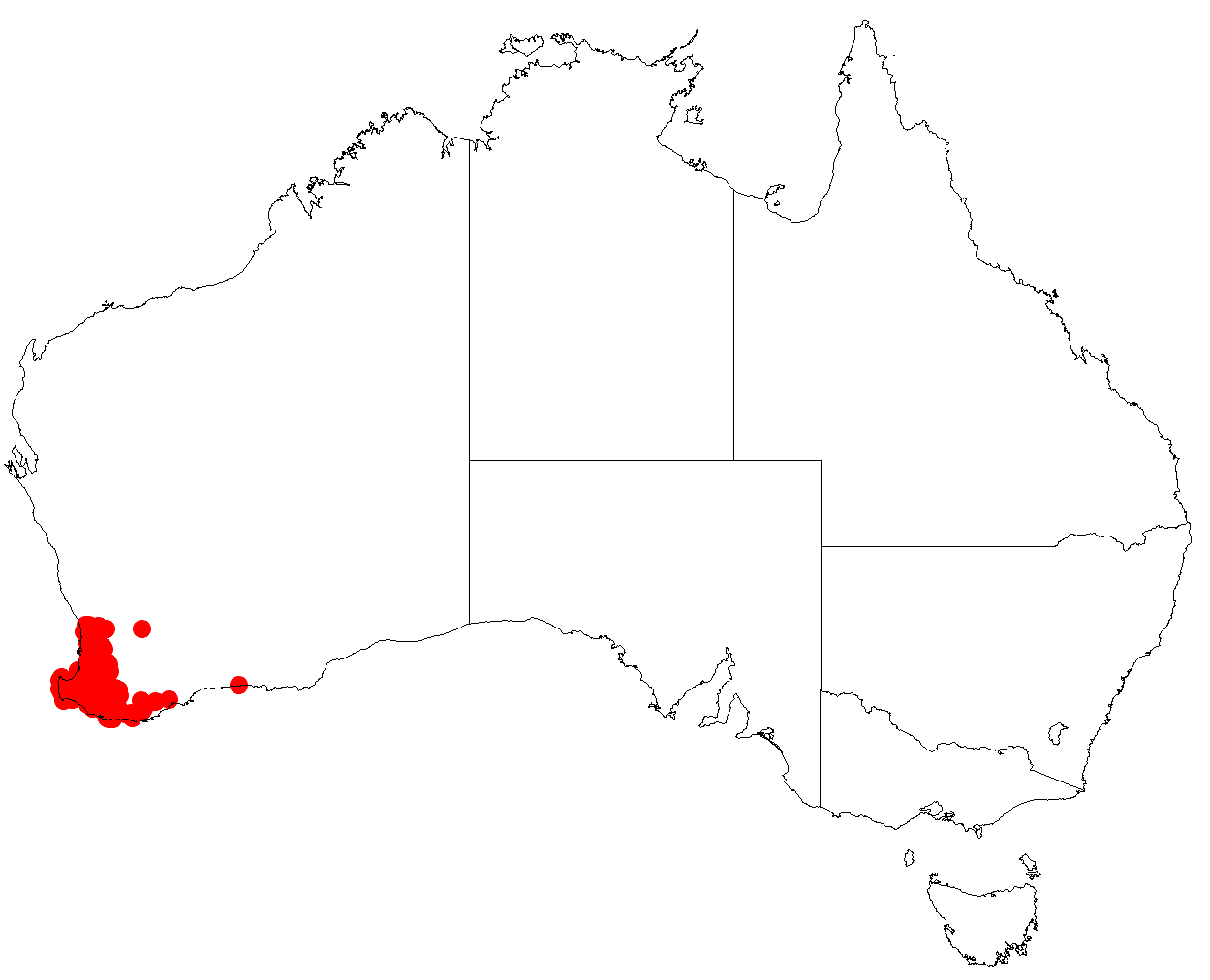
- Occurrence data from AVH

Synonyms
- Leucopogon capitellatus DC. var. capitellatus; Styphelia capitellata (DC.) F.Muell.

Species of plant

Leucopogon capitellatus is a species of flowering plant in the heath family Ericaceae and is endemic to the south-west of Western Australia. It is an erect, more or less glabrous shrub that typically grows to a height of 0.2–1 m (7.9 in – 3 ft 3.4 in). It has linear to lance-shaped leaves longer than about 12 mm (0.47 in) long, tapering to a rigid point on the tip. The flowers are borne on short spikes on the ends of branches or in leaf axils on short side branches, with small bracts and bracteoles about half as long as the sepals. The sepals are broad, about 2 mm (0.079 in) long and the petals white and about 4 mm (0.16 in) long, the petal lobes longer than the petal tube.

It was first formally described in 1839 by Augustin Pyramus de Candolle in his Prodromus Systematis Naturalis Regni Vegetabilis from specimens collected by James Drummond in the Swan River Colony. The specific epithet (capitellatus) means "forming a small head".

This leucopogon grows in a variety of habitats in the Jarrah Forest, Swan Coastal Plain and Warren bioregions of south-western Western Australia and is listed as "not threatened" by the Western Australian Government Department of Biodiversity, Conservation and Attractions.
