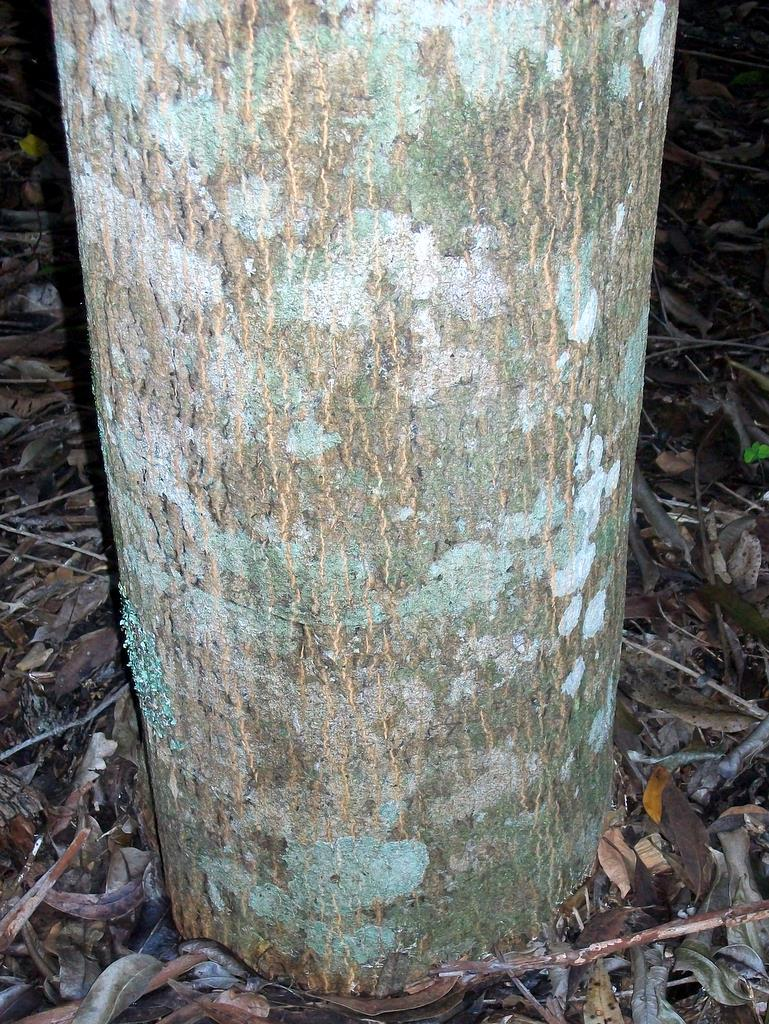
- Bog onion, trunk

Scientific classification
- Kingdom: Plantae
- Clade: Embryophytes
- Clade: Tracheophytes
- Clade: Spermatophytes
- Clade: Angiosperms
- Clade: Eudicots
- Clade: Rosids
- Order: Sapindales
- Family: Meliaceae
- Genus: Owenia
- Species: O. cepiodora

Binomial name
- Owenia cepiodora F.Muell.

= Owenia cepiodora =

Species of tree

Owenia cepiodora is a medium to large Australian tree in the family Meliaceae. It occurs in the rainforests of north eastern New South Wales and adjacent areas in Queensland. The habitat is mostly the drier hoop pine rainforests along the state border. Only small regrowth trees remain, as it was heavily logged in earlier times. Its status is now considered vulnerable with a ROTAP rating of 2VCi.

Common names include onion cedar, onionwood and bog onion. The timber resembles the valuable Australian red cedar. Logs were soaked to remove the characteristic onion scent and sold as red cedar. The species name refers to the onion scent. It is found as far south as the Richmond River and as far north as Canungra, in the Gold Coast hinterland.

== Description ==
A tree up to 30 metres tall with a stem diameter of 75 cm. The crown of the tree resembles the dark glossy green black bean tree. A cylindrical trunk with brown bark with vertical cracks and lines. Small branches are marked with leaf scars; thick smooth and pale brown.

Compound leaves are between 30 and 60 cm long with 17 to 25 leaflets, sub opposite on the main leaf stem. Notably, there is no terminal leaflet. Leaflets 7 to 14 cm long, and 1.5 to 3.5 cm wide, broad lanceolate in shape. Glossy green above, paler and more dull beneath. The midrib is raised above and below on the leaflet. Older foliage without a distinct odour, however, new leaves have a garlic scent. The main leaf stalk is 20 to 30 cm long, and the leaflet stalks are 2 to 5 mm long.

=== Flowers, fruit and regeneration ===
White flowers form on panicles in the months of November to December. Petals five in number per flower, around 4 mm long. The fruit is round red drupe, with white pulp. 1.5 to 2 cm in diameter with two, three or four cells, each with usually two seeds. Fruit matures from January to March. Regeneration is unreliable, however it occurs around November to January.
