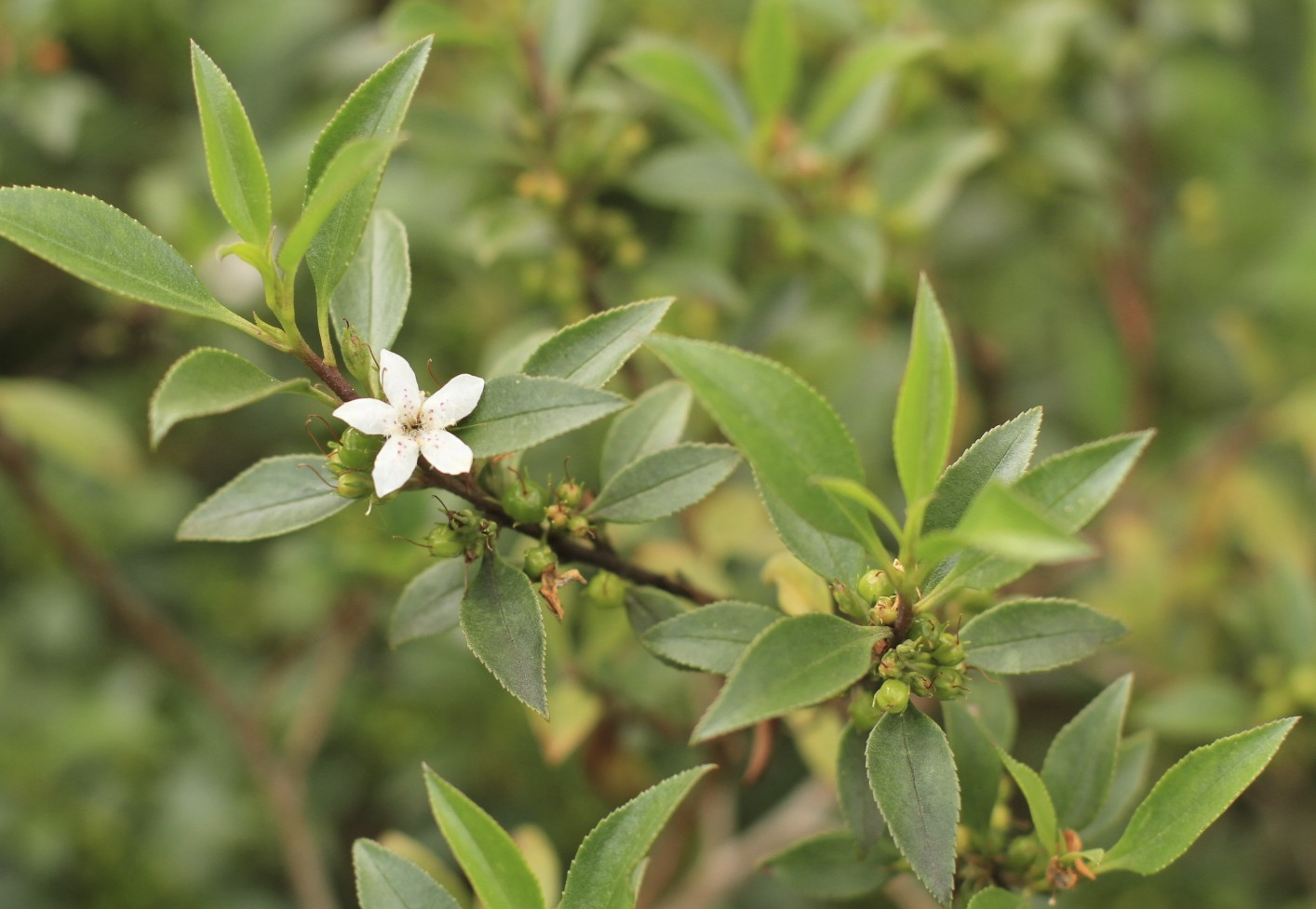

Scientific classification
- Kingdom: Plantae
- Clade: Tracheophytes
- Clade: Angiosperms
- Clade: Eudicots
- Clade: Asterids
- Order: Lamiales
- Family: Scrophulariaceae
- Genus: Myoporum
- Species: M. viscosum

Binomial name
- Myoporum viscosum R.Br.

Synonyms
- Myoporum glandulosum (Spin) Spin; Myoporum serratum var. glandulosum (Spin) Benth.

= Myoporum viscosum =

Sticky boobialla

Species of plant

Myoporum viscosum, commonly known as sticky boobialla, is a plant in the figwort family, Scrophulariaceae and is endemic to South Australia. It is unusual in that sometimes, especially when the leaves are crushed, it has an extremely unpleasant smell.

== Description ==
Myoporum viscosum is a shrub which sometimes grows to 2 metres (7 ft) in height with young branches that are flattened and sticky. The leaves are arranged alternately and mostly 20–52 millimetres (0.8–2 in) long, 7–20 millimetres (0.3–0.8 in) wide, thick and stiff. The base of the leaf partly wraps around the stem and the leaf blade is folded or curved with serrated edges and has many oil dots.

The flowers appear in the leaf axils in clusters of 5 to 8 on a stalk 4–8 millimetres (0.2–0.3 in) long. There are 5 triangular sepals and 5 petals joined at their bases to form a bell-shaped tube. The petals are white with a slight purplish flush and purple spots. The petal tube is 3–4 millimetres (0.1–0.2 in) long, the lobes are about the same length and the inside of the tube as well as the bases of the lobes are hairy. The main flowering period is from June to November and is followed by fruits which are succulent, rounded purplish drupes around 3–5 millimetres (0.1–0.2 in) in diameter.

== Taxonomy and naming ==
Myoporum viscosum was first formally described by botanist Robert Brown in Prodromus Florae Novae Hollandiae in 1810 from a specimen collected at Memory Cove. The specific epithet is derived from the Latin word viscum meaning "bird-lime" with the ending -osus "abounding in", that is, "sticky" or "viscid".

== Distribution and habitat ==
For many years this species has been confused with the much more common species Myoporum petiolatum which has thinner, noticeably petiolate and non-odorous leaves. Myoporum viscosum has a restricted distribution encompassing Kangaroo Island and coastal areas of the Eyre and Yorke peninsulas.

== Use in horticulture ==
Sticky boobialla is a hardy plant which can tolerate salt spray and can be used as a low screening plant. It is readily propagated from cuttings and grows best in full sun.
