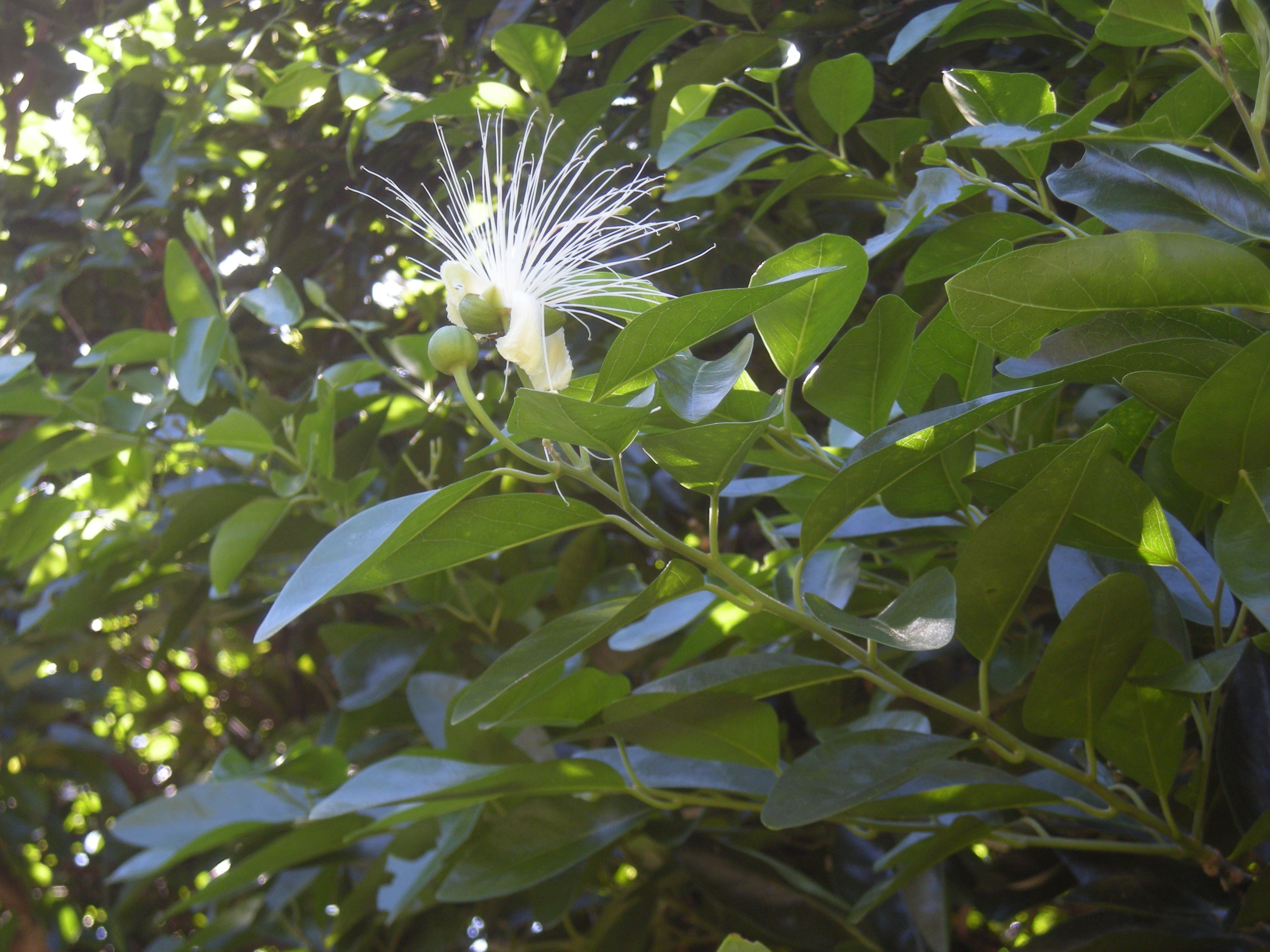
- Flower and leaves

Scientific classification
- Kingdom: Plantae
- Clade: Tracheophytes
- Clade: Angiosperms
- Clade: Eudicots
- Clade: Rosids
- Order: Brassicales
- Family: Capparaceae
- Genus: Capparis
- Species: C. arborea

Binomial name
- Capparis arborea (F.Muell.) Maiden

Synonyms
- Capparis nobilis var. arborea F.Muell. (Endl.)

= Capparis arborea =

Species of tree

Capparis arborea is a bush or small tree occurring in eastern Australia. Its habitat is rainforest, usually riverine, littoral or the drier rainforests. It is distributed from the Hunter River, New South Wales to Cape Melville in tropical Queensland. Common names include native pomegranate, wild lime, wild lemon and brush caper berry. Capparis arborea is a host plant for the caper white (Belenois java), which migrate across the eastern seaboard in large numbers in the summer. It also feeds the chalky white (Elodina parthia)

== Description ==
Capparis arborea grows up to 8 metres tall with a stem diameter of 25 cm, but is usually seen much smaller. The trunk is crooked, short and irregular in appearance. Many sharp prickles grow on younger plants. Older trees have grey bark, with less sharp spines. Its small branches are fairly thick and dark grey, though more green at the end.

Leaves alternate on the stem, and are simple, oblong-lanceolate or sometimes oblong-ovate in shape. They are 5 to 10 cm long, and 1.5 to 5 cm wide, and mostly rounded at the tip, although some leaves are pointed at the tip. Juvenile leaves are smaller than adult leaves with a prickly pointed leaf tip. Leaf veins are visible on both surfaces with the midrib raised under the leaf, but sunken on top of the leaf.

=== Flowers and fruit ===
Single white flowers form from the leaf axils and are 4 cm in diameter. The attractive, open wiry flowers form from January to March. The petals are 15 mm long, fringed at the edges. The thin flower stalks are 3 to 5 cm long.

From December to March, a fruit resembling a guava forms. It is green, smooth and soft, globular in shape and 2.5 to 6 cm in diameter. The fruit stalks are 3 to 5 cm long. The seeds are round and flattened, and 8 to 10 mm in diameter. The ripe fruit are yellow with the pulp surrounding the seeds being edible. They were a source of food for Aboriginal people. Germination from fresh seed is not particularly difficult, with the first seeds germinating after three weeks.

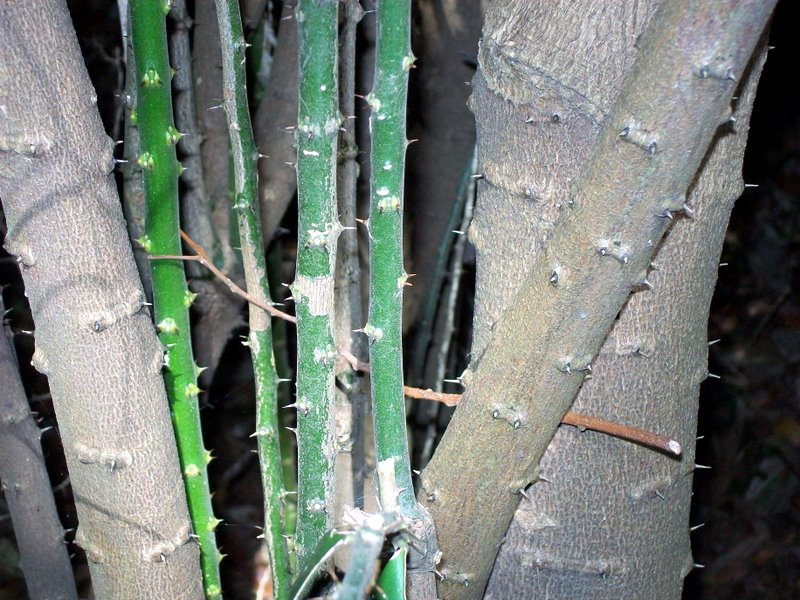
Prickly trunk of Capparis arborea
