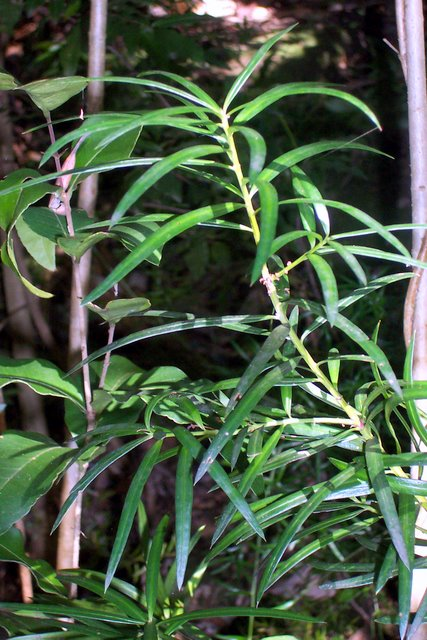
- Podocarpus spinulosus at Chatswood West, Australia

Conservation status
- Least Concern (IUCN 3.1)

Scientific classification
- Kingdom: Plantae
- Clade: Tracheophytes
- Clade: Gymnosperms
- Division: Pinophyta
- Class: Pinopsida
- Order: Araucariales
- Family: Podocarpaceae
- Genus: Podocarpus
- Species: P. spinulosus

Binomial name
- Podocarpus spinulosus (Sm.) R.Br. ex Mirb.

Synonyms
- Margbensonia spinulosa (Sm.) A.V.Bobrov & Melikyan; Nageia ensifolia (R.Br. ex Carrière) Kuntze; Nageia spinulosa (Sm.) F.Muell.; Podocarpus bidwillii Hooibr. ex Endl.; Podocarpus ensifolius R.Br. ex Carrière; Podocarpus pungens Caley ex D.Don; Taxus spinulosa Sm.

= Podocarpus spinulosus =

Species of conifer

Podocarpus spinulosus, the dwarf plum pine or spiny-leaf podocarp, is a species of conifer in the family Podocarpaceae, native to the warm-temperate coastal regions of New South Wales and southern Queensland. It is generally an understorey shrub, rarely growing more than 2 m tall.

It was first described by James Edward Smith in 1817 as Taxus spinulosa. It was reclassified 'as Podocarpus spinulosus in 1825.

The leaves are needle-like, 2–8 cm (0.79–3.15 in) long, sharply pointed, green above and with glaucous stomatal bands beneath. The cones are berry-like, with a fleshy, edible purple-black aril 1–2 cm (0.39–0.79 in) long and one (rarely two) apical seed 1 cm (0.5 in) long.
