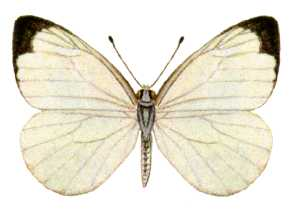

Scientific classification
- Kingdom: Animalia
- Phylum: Arthropoda
- Class: Insecta
- Order: Lepidoptera
- Family: Pieridae
- Genus: Elodina
- Species: E. parthia

Binomial name
- Elodina parthia (Hewitson, 1853)

Synonyms
- Pieris parthia Hewitson, 1853

= Elodina parthia =

Species of butterfly

Elodina parthia, the chalk white, is a butterfly in the family Pieridae. It is found in the Australian states of New South Wales and Queensland.

The wingspan is about 35 mm.
