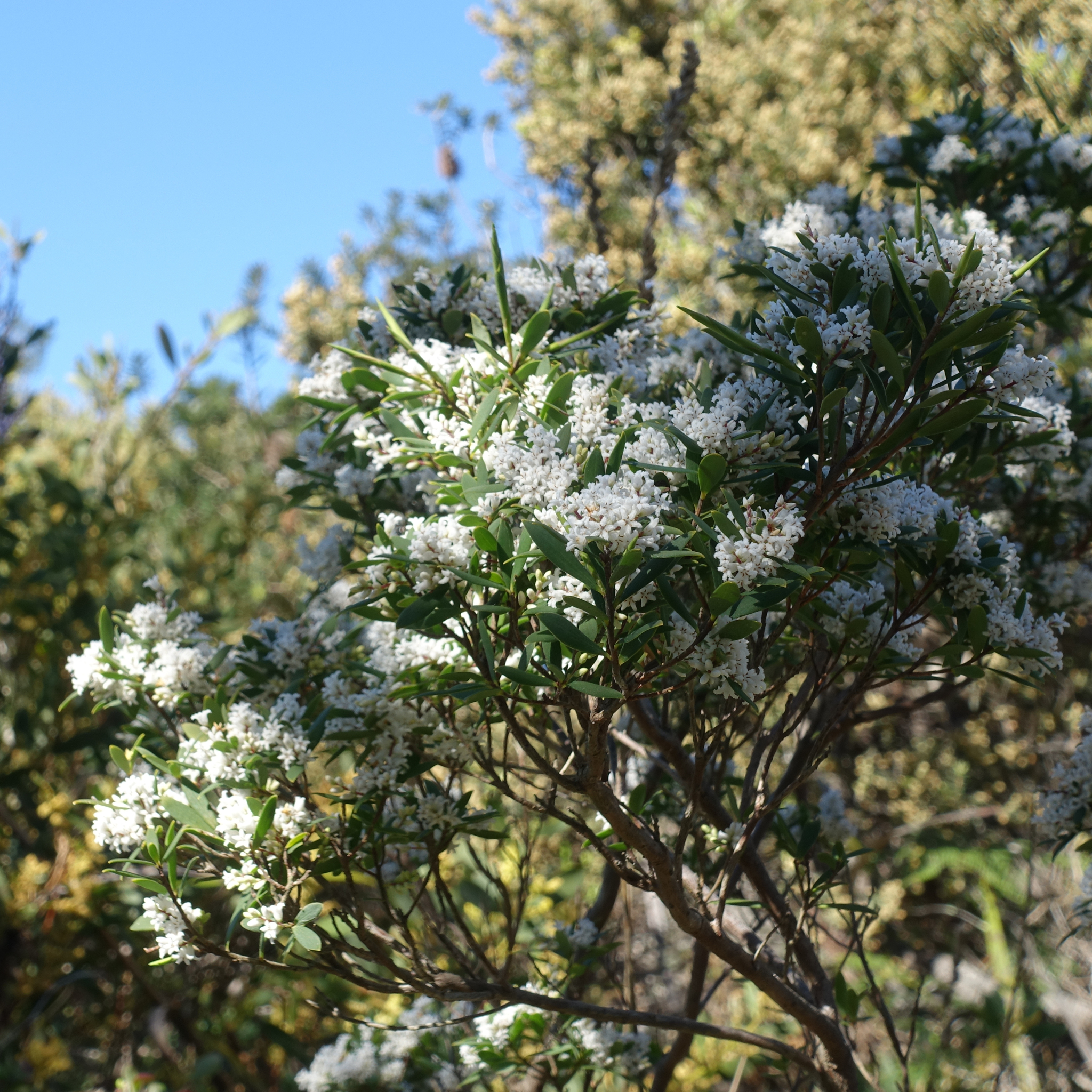
- Near Bicheno

Scientific classification
- Kingdom: Plantae
- Clade: Tracheophytes
- Clade: Angiosperms
- Clade: Eudicots
- Clade: Asterids
- Order: Ericales
- Family: Ericaceae
- Genus: Leucopogon
- Species: L. australis

Binomial name
- Leucopogon australis R.Br.
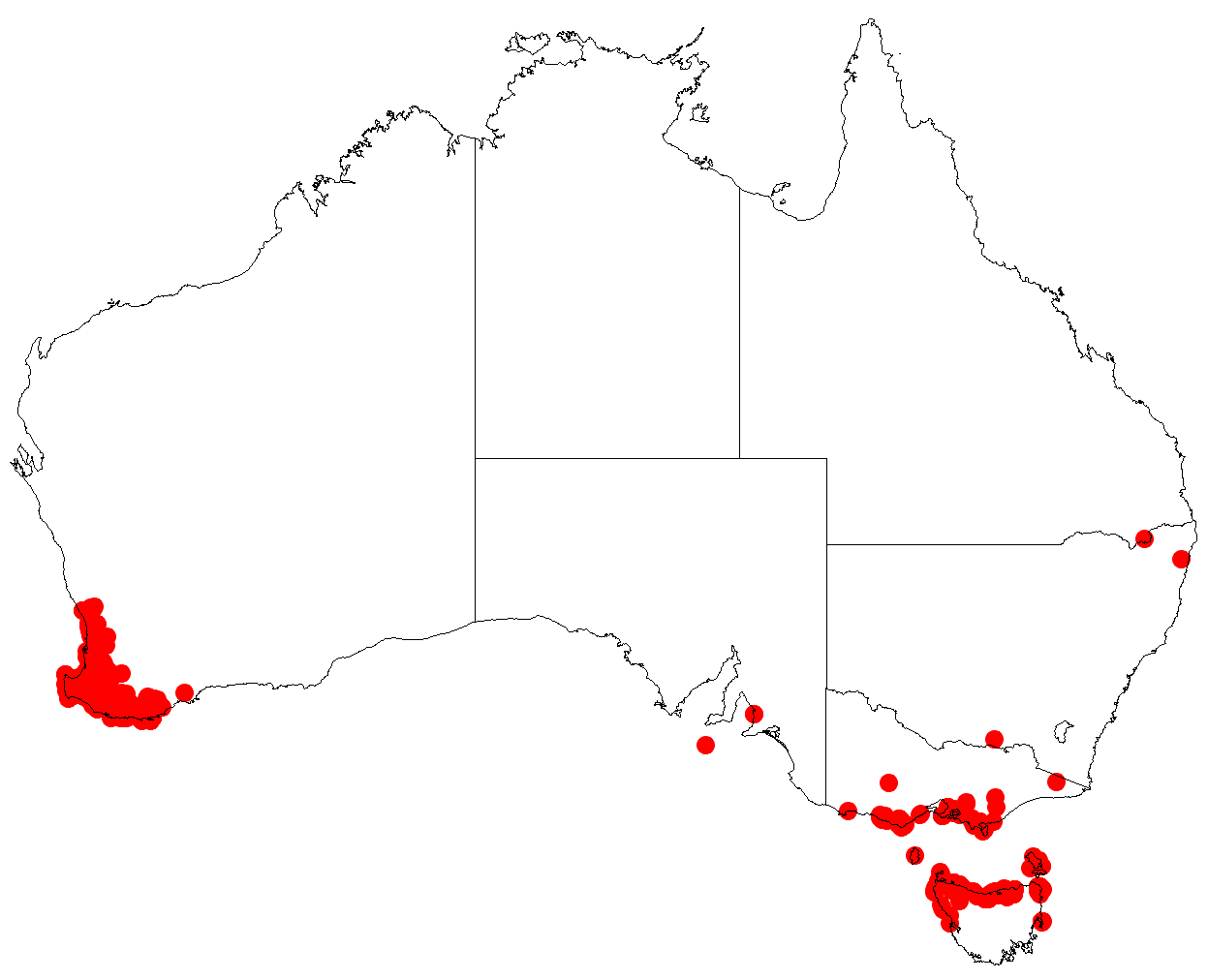
- Occurrence data from AVH

Synonyms
- Leucopogon drummondi DC. orth. var.; Leucopogon drummondii DC.; Leucopogon paniculatus Sond.; ? Leucopogon parviflorus var. acutifolius J.R.Wheeler, N.G.Marchant & M.Lewington nom. inval., nom. nud.; Styphelia australis (R.Br.) F.Muell.

= Leucopogon australis =

Species of plant

Leucopogon australis, commonly known as spiked beard-heath, is a species of flowering plant in the heath family Ericaceae and is endemic to southern Australia. It is an erect, aromatic shrub with narrowly egg-shaped to narrowly elliptic leaves, and white flowers arranged in spikes near the ends of branchlets.

== Description ==
Leucopogon australis is an erect, aromatic shrub that typically grows to a height of 1–2 m (3 ft 3 in – 6 ft 7 in) and has glabrous branchlets. The leaves are more or less glabrous, narrowly egg-shaped to narrowly elliptic, 10–85 mm (0.39–3.35 in) long and 2–10 mm (0.079–0.394 in) wide on a petiole 0.6–1.5 mm (0.024–0.059 in) long. The flowers are arranged in groups of 8 to 28 and 8–34 mm (0.31–1.34 in) long on the ends of branchlets, or in upper leaf axils, with egg-shaped bracts 0.7–1 mm (0.028–0.039 in) long and similar bracteoles. The sepals are egg-shaped, 1.2–1.9 mm (0.047–0.075 in) long and yellowish. The petals are joined at the base to form a bell-shaped tube about as long as the sepals, the lobes white and 2.3–2.7 mm (0.091–0.106 in) long and densely bearded on the inside. Flowering occurs from September to November and the fruit is a flattened spherical drupe 1.8–2.2 mm (0.071–0.087 in) long.

== Taxonomy and naming ==
Leucopogon australis was first formally described in 1810 by Robert Brown in his Prodromus Florae Novae Hollandiae. The specific epithet (australis) means "southern".

== Distribution and habitat ==
This leucopogon grows in the understorey of forest in wetter places within 100 km (62 mi) of the coast of Western Australia between Gingin, Augusta and Albany, Peterborough and Yarram in Victoria, and northern Tasmania, where it is rare.
