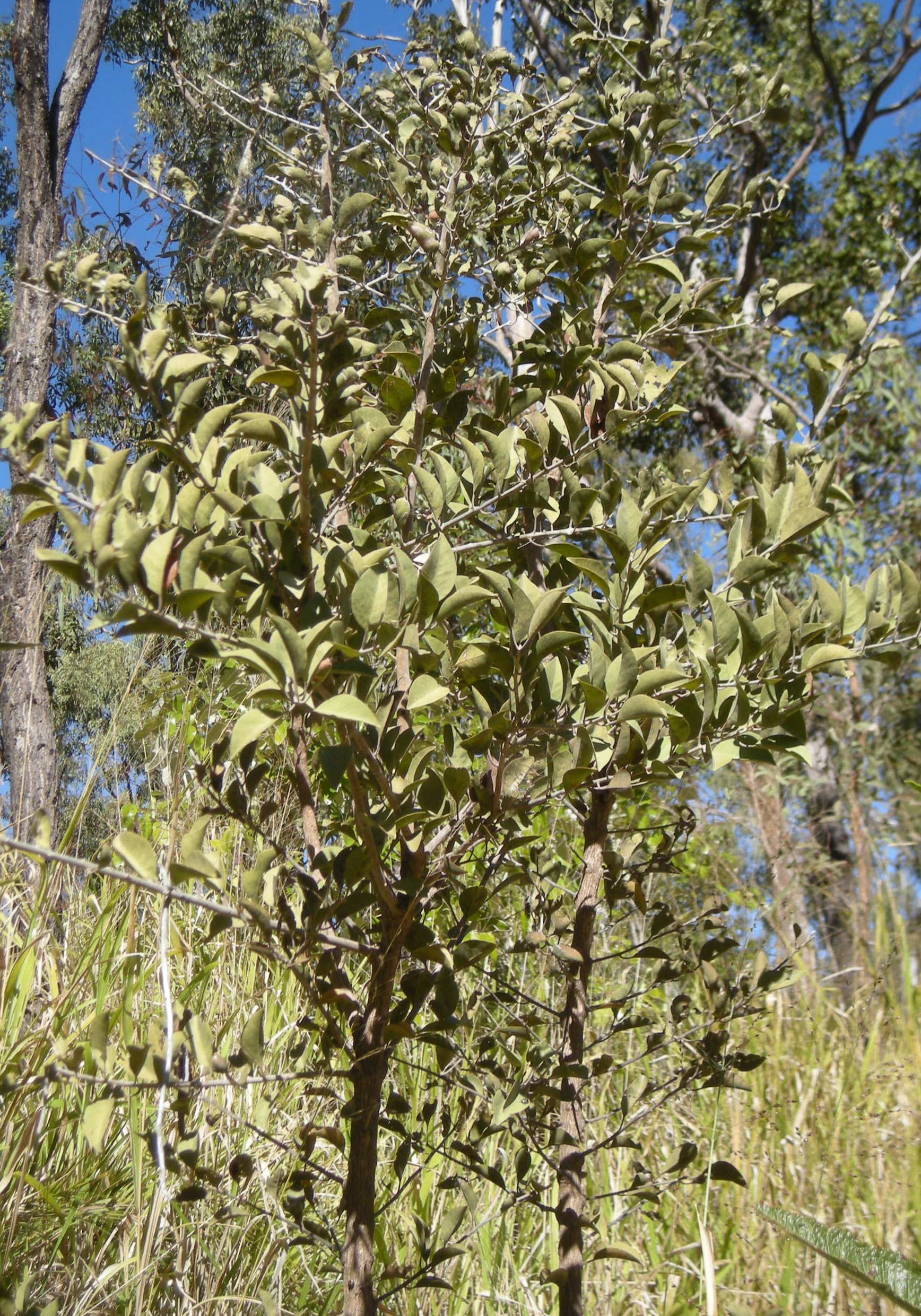

Scientific classification
- Kingdom: Plantae
- Clade: Tracheophytes
- Clade: Angiosperms
- Clade: Eudicots
- Clade: Rosids
- Order: Brassicales
- Family: Capparaceae
- Genus: Capparis
- Species: C. canescens

Binomial name
- Capparis canescens Banks ex DC.

Synonyms
- Busbeckea canescens F.Muell.; Capparis areolata F.M.Bailey; Capparis armata Domin; Capparis canescens var. glauca Benth.; Capparis muelleri Domin

= Capparis canescens =

Species of plant

Capparis canescens, also known as wild orange, orangewood, native pomegranate, wild pomegranate or grey capparis, is a species of plant in the caper family. It is native to north-eastern Australia.

== Description ==
The species grows as a shrub or small tree up to 4 m (13 ft). The oval leaves are 4.5–10 cm (1.8–3.9 in) long by 2.5–6 cm (0.98–2.36 in) wide. The white flowers are 3 cm (1.2 in) long, with the buds having four prominent ridges. The round fruits are 2.5–7.5 cm (0.98–2.95 in) in diameter.

== Distribution and habitat ==
The species is found mainly in eastern Queensland, extending into northern New South Wales. It occurs in open eucalypt forest.
