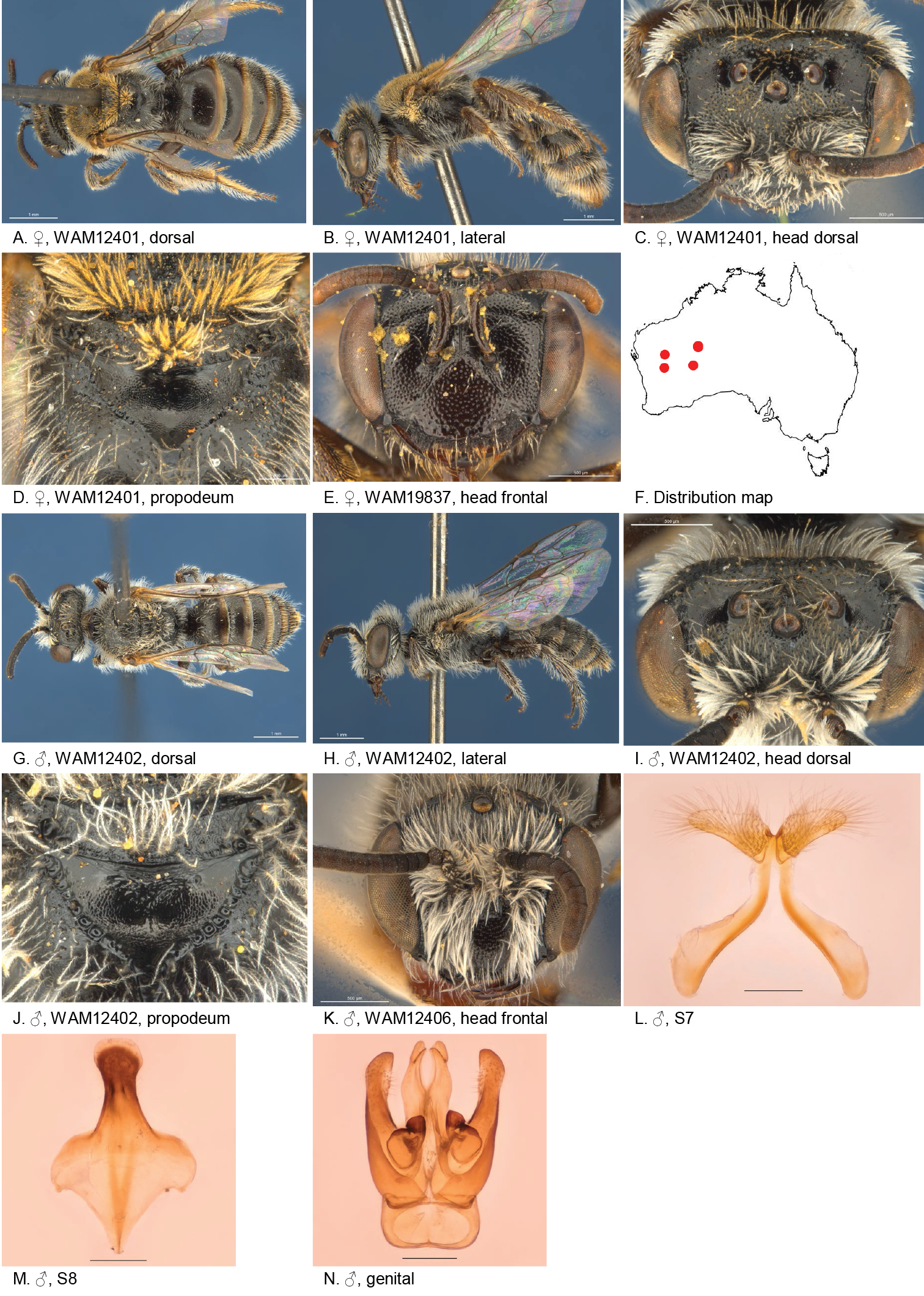
- Female holotype and male allotype

Scientific classification
- Kingdom: Animalia
- Phylum: Arthropoda
- Clade: Pancrustacea
- Class: Insecta
- Order: Hymenoptera
- Family: Colletidae
- Genus: Leioproctus
- Species: L. pilotapilus

Binomial name
- Leioproctus pilotapilus Leijs 2018

= Leioproctus pilotapilus =

Species of bee

Leioproctus pilotapilus, or Leioproctus (Colletellus) pilotapilus, is a species of bee in the family Colletidae and subfamily Colletinae. It is endemic to Australia. It was described by entomologist Remko Leijs in 2018.

== Etymology ==
The specific epithet pilotapilus refers to the short, dense hair on the scutum.

== Description ==
The female holotype body length is 6.6 mm, head width 1.8 mm; the male allotype body length 5.9 mm, head width 1.85 mm. Integumental colouration is mainly black, orange and brown. The hair is white to brown.

== Distribution and habitat ==
The species occurs in inland Western Australia. The type locality is 41 km east of Charlies Knob, in the Young Range of the Gibson Desert.

== Behaviour ==
The adults are flying mellivores. Flowering plants visited by the bees include Podolepis canescens, Schoenia cassiniana and Helipterum craspedioides.

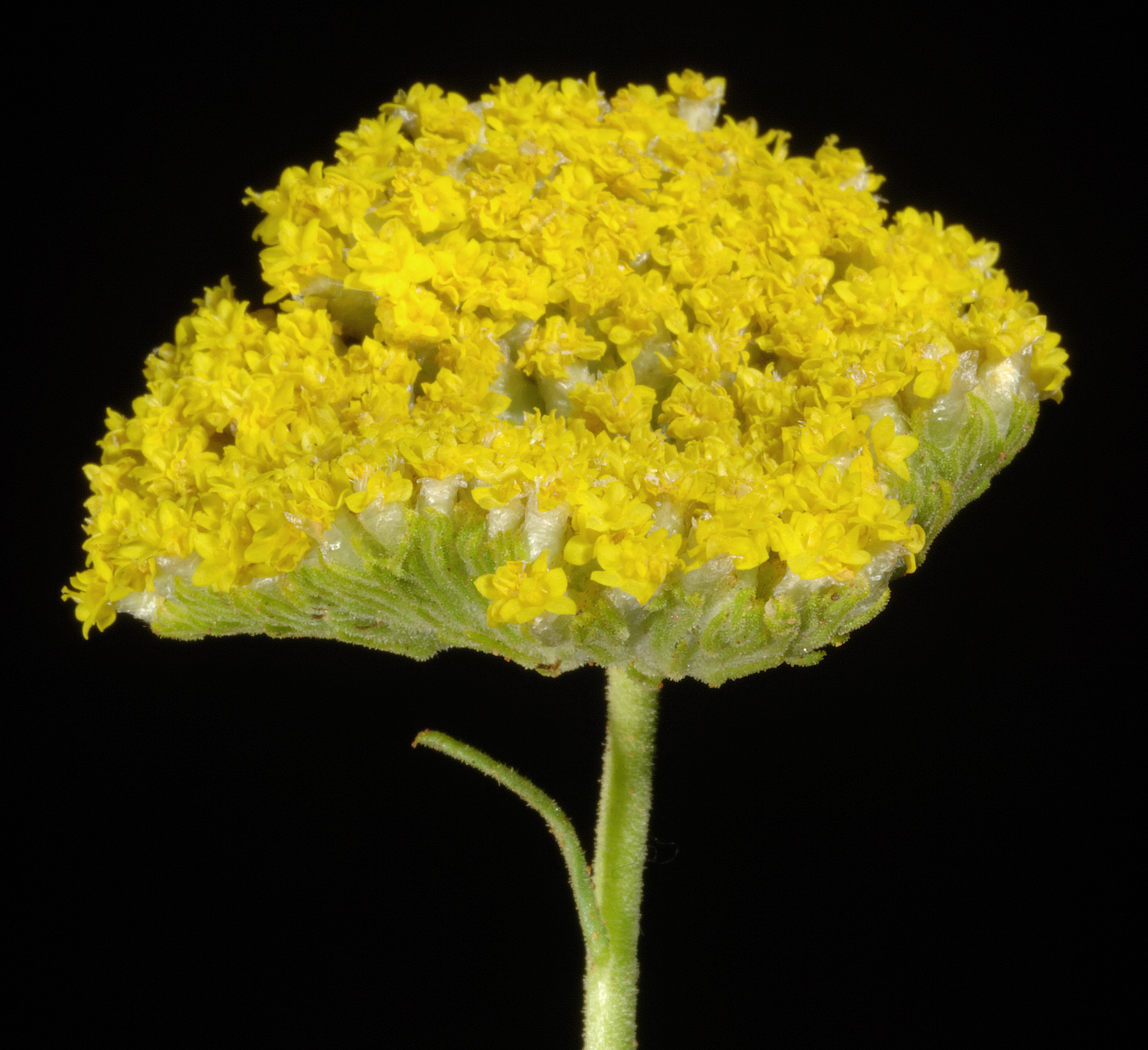
Flowers of Helipterum craspedioides (yellow billy buttons), a forage plant of the bees
