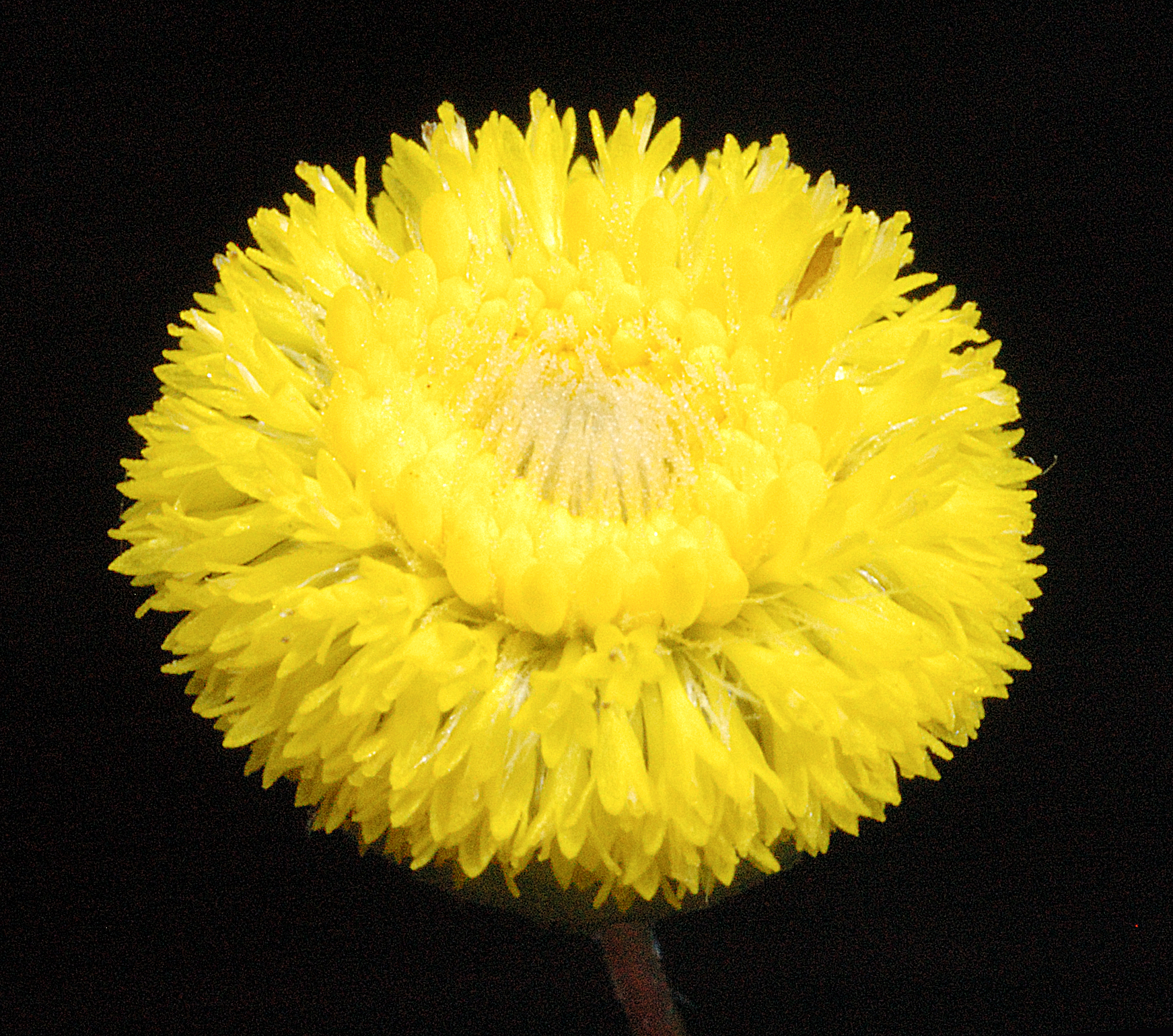
- Podolepis lessonii
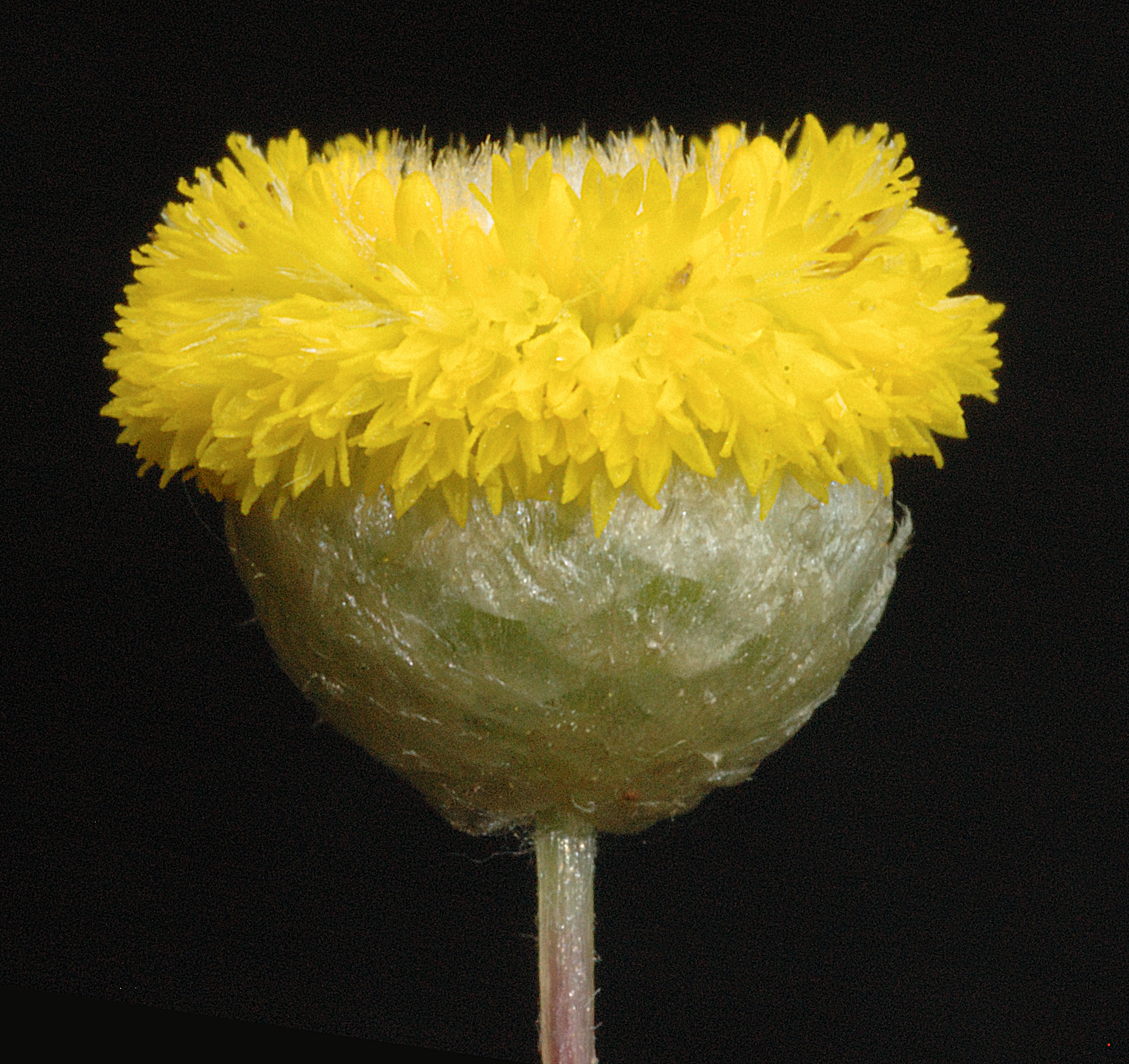

Scientific classification
- Kingdom: Plantae
- Clade: Tracheophytes
- Clade: Angiosperms
- Clade: Eudicots
- Clade: Asterids
- Order: Asterales
- Family: Asteraceae
- Genus: Panaetia; Cass.

Type species
- Panaetia lessonii Cass.

Species
- Panaetia davisiana (D.A.Cooke) Jeanes; Panaetia lessonii Cass.; Panaetia muelleri Sond.; Panaetia tepperi (F.Muell.) Jeanes

= Panaetia =

Genus of plants in the daisy family

Panaetia, a genus in the Asteraceae (daisy) family, was first described by Henri Cassini in 1829 In 2021, the Western Australian Herbarium accepted Jeffery Jeanes new circumscription of the genus, together with two species of Panaetia as being found in Western Australia: Panaetia lessonii, and Panaetia tepperi. Jeanes distinguished Panaetia from the genera, Podolepis, Siemssenia and Walshia, using the following characters:

1. the outer florets are all tubular; and
2. the cypselas are minutely tuberculate and lack long finger-like papillae.

The genus is named for the stoic philosopher, Panaetius of Rhodes.
