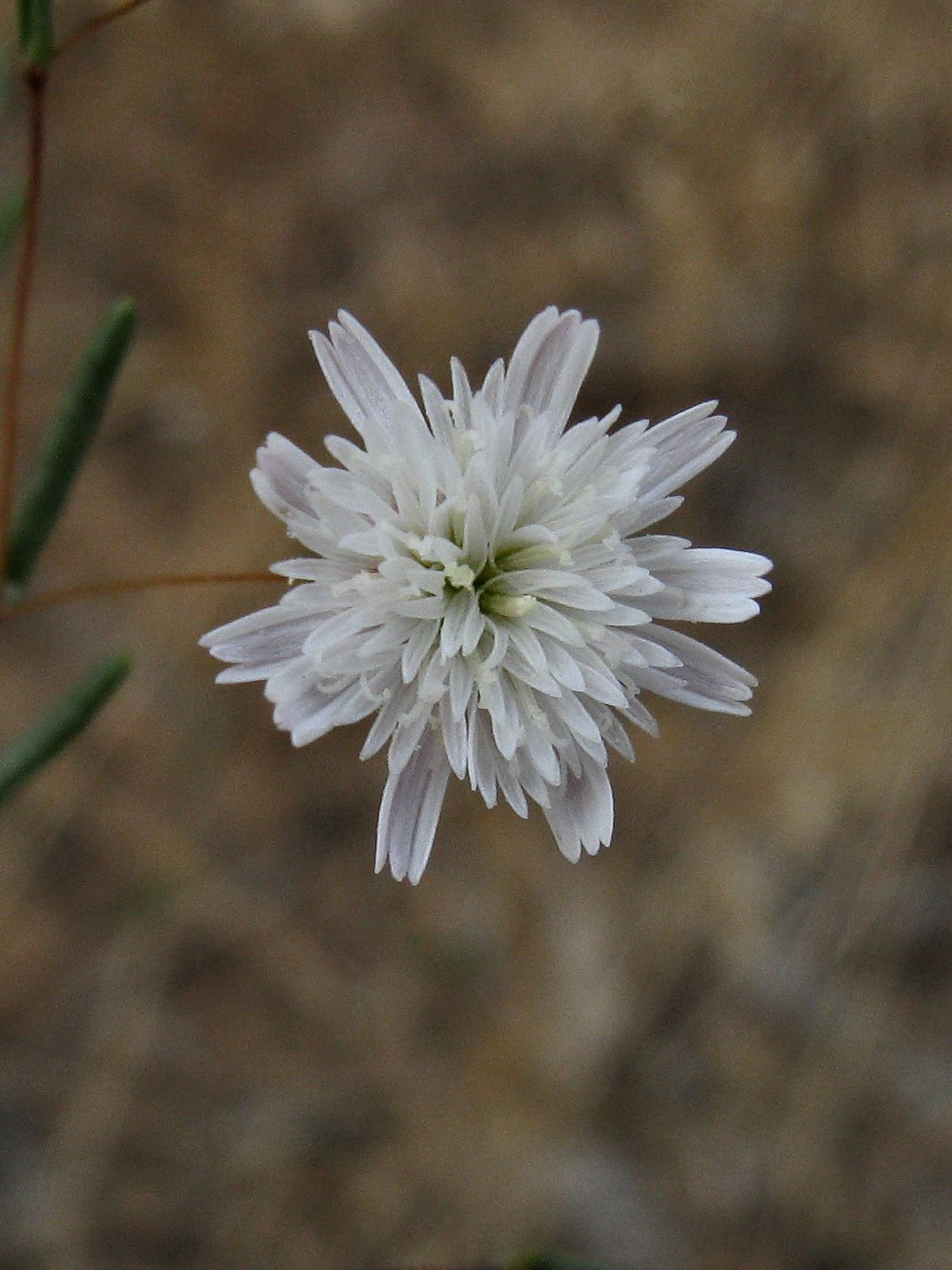

Scientific classification
- Kingdom: Plantae
- Clade: Tracheophytes
- Clade: Angiosperms
- Clade: Eudicots
- Clade: Asterids
- Order: Asterales
- Family: Asteraceae
- Genus: Podolepis
- Species: P. capillaris

Binomial name
- Podolepis capillaris (Steetz) Diels
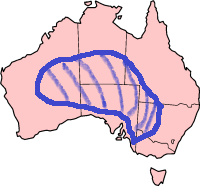
- Estimated distribution of Podolepis capillaris

= Podolepis capillaris =

Wiry podolepis

Species of flowering plant

Podelepis capillaris, the wiry podolepis, is a hardy small herb endemic to inland and central Australia, it produces a thin stem and a white flower with purple strips underneath each petal.

== Taxonomy ==
Podelepis capillaris was first described in 1905 by European botanists Frederich Ludwig Emil Deils & Ernst Pritzel. Its taxonomy to this genus is accepted due to its affinity with 18 other species of genus Podolepis that are also endemic to Australia. Commonality in genus are specimens will have fine septate hairs and often minute glandular hairs and tubular florets. It is part of family Asteraceae that forms commonality with almost 20000 species worldwide, having commonality with daisies, thistles, sunflowers and many others.

== Description ==
Podelepis capillaris, sometimes referred to as an invisible plant is a wiry many branched annual herb that can grow up to 45 cm high. It has thin stems that a widely smooth except for cobwebbed hairs in leaf axils. Leaves are few, they grow in a linear fashion. They are smooth and small and soon wither on plant, they connect directly to the stem (cauline) and are 0.5 – 4 cm long. Flowers are formed as a radiate head. Florets are capitula and grow in ray florets of 9-12 petals and disc florets of 17–22. Podelepis capillaris can be differentiated from other species in the genus Podolepis by it having mostly white flowers, often with a purple line on the underside. This species is a prolific flowerer and flowers throughout August to March. In comparison to most other Podolepis it grows with minimal leaves due to an adjustment to its local environment.

== Distribution and habitat ==
Podelepis capillaris is a very hardy plant and suitable for dry and hot conditions. It grows most often in deep inland sands or shallow soils on hill lines, with tolerance for saline conditions. This means that it is well suited to interior of Australia extending its distribution through many states within Australia from North western Victoria, throughout central west New South Wales, South Australia, WA and Northern Territory.

The widespread distribution of the species could be linked to its ability for the species to hybridize easily with its close relations and is likely to have caused easy differentiation between species. Distribution could only be expected to increase as time goes by due to the effects of climate change. This species will survive quite happily alongside other species owing to its ability to survive in sandy conditions and often disturbed areas, by human or natural processes. It would be considered of least concern in terms of threat to the species.

== Reproduction ==
Podelepis capillaris relies primarily on pollinating insects, however it can self pollinate at points during its cycle. Like most members of family Asteraceae, Podelepis capillaris employs a system of pollination called secondary pollination or plunger pollination . In this system the flowers are such that the stamens form a tube around immature style, with their pollen surfaces facing inwards. As the style elongates within the tube it pushes pollen out the closed stigma for pollinators to accept. The closed stigma means that it is unreceptive to its pollen at this stage and can cross to other individuals. When its stigma becomes receptive it awaits outcross pollen from other individuals, however if it is not fertilized during this period it shifts to self pollination. This achieved by the fine hairs that hold the released pollen curling down towards that stamen at the closing stages of the plants cycle. This ensures that seed production is still achieved, these produced seeds are light and spread easily, by distances by the wind.
