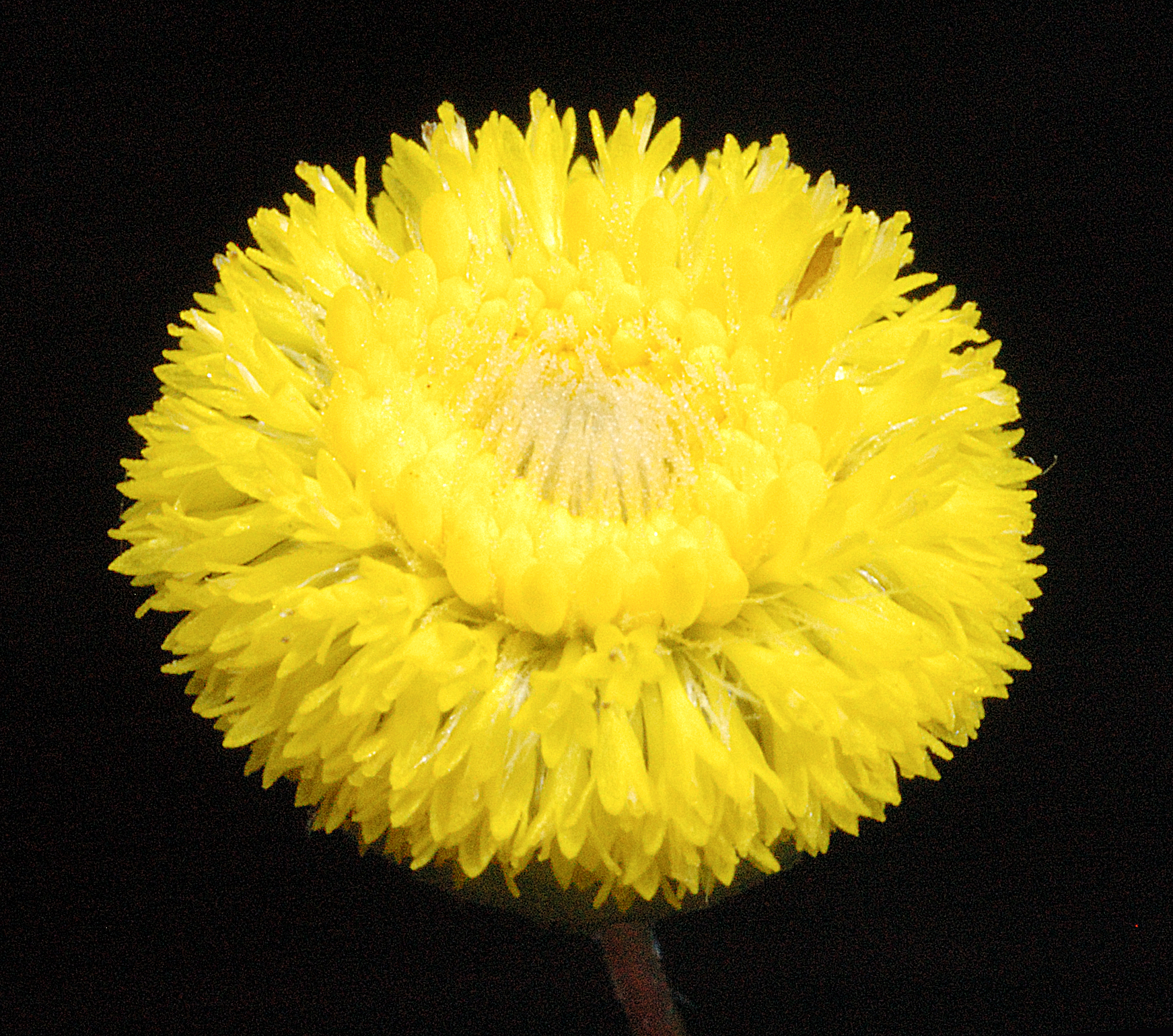

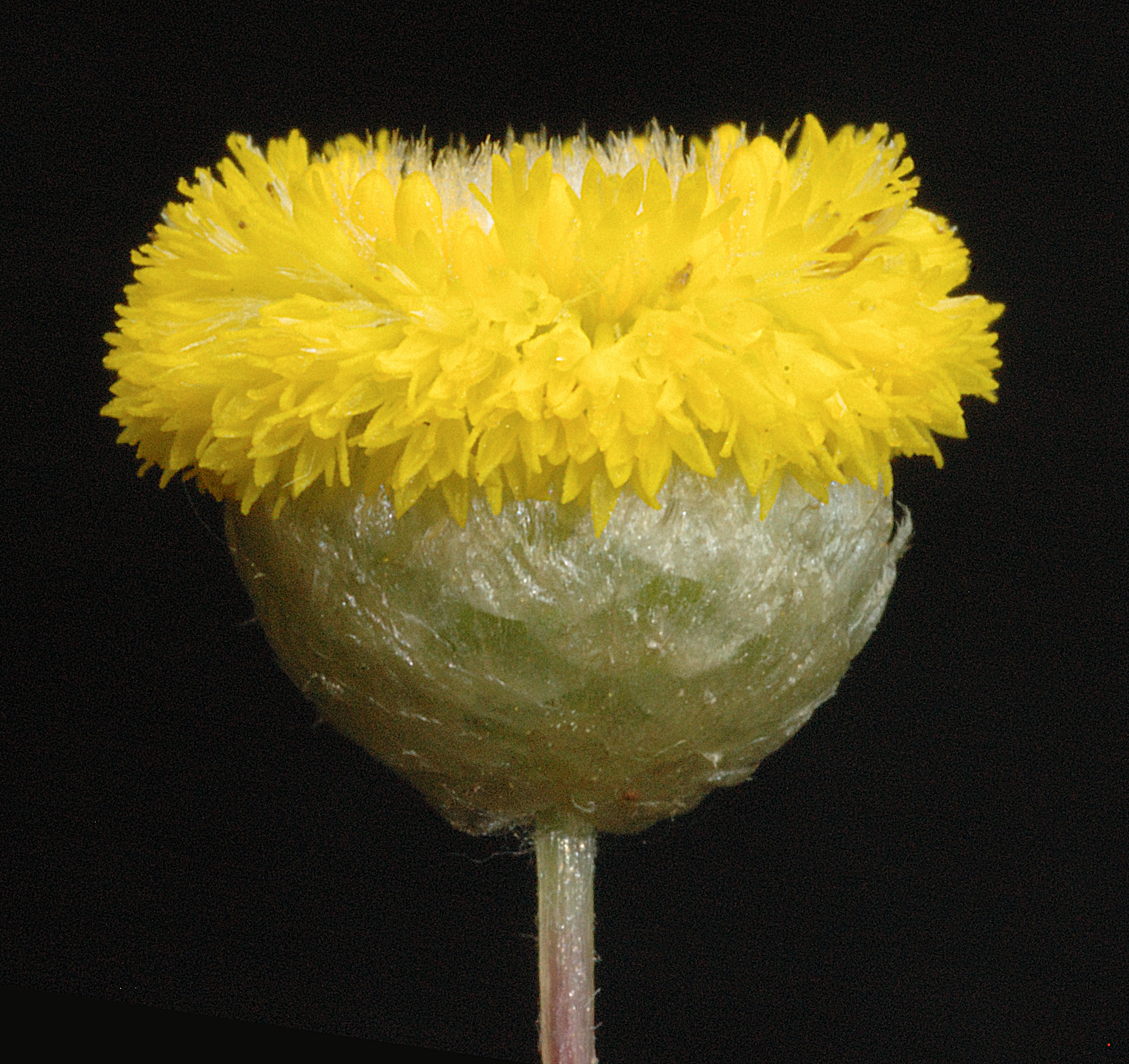

Scientific classification
- Kingdom: Plantae
- Clade: Tracheophytes
- Clade: Angiosperms
- Clade: Eudicots
- Clade: Asterids
- Order: Asterales
- Family: Asteraceae
- Genus: Podolepis
- Species: P. lessonii

Binomial name
- Podolepis lessonii (Cass.) Benth.

Synonyms
- Panaetia lessonii Cass. Podolepis gilbertii Turcz. Scalia lessonii (Cass.) Kuntze

= Podolepis lessonii =

Member of the daisy family, native to WA

Podolepis lessonii is an erect annual herb native to Western Australia, belonging to the Asteraceae family.

== Taxonomy ==
The species was first described in 1829 as Panaetia lessonii by the French botanist, Henri Cassini. The species epithet, lessonii, honours Monsieur Lesson who collected a specimen from King George Sound in 1826. The species was assigned to the genus, Podolepis, in 1867 by George Bentham. The name currently accepted by the Western Australian Herbarium is Panaetia lessonii Cass., because of the studies of Jeffrey Jeanes, who distinguished Panaetia from the genera, Podolepis, Siemssenia and Walshia, using the following characters:

1. the outer florets are all tubular; and
2. the cypselas are minutely tuberculate and lack long finger-like papillae.

== Distribution and habitat ==
It is found widely in Beard's South-West and Eremaean provinces, in many different habitats and soils.
