= Leioproctus xanthozoster =

Scientific classification
- Kingdom: Animalia
- Phylum: Arthropoda
- Clade: Pancrustacea
- Class: Insecta
- Order: Hymenoptera
- Family: Colletidae
- Genus: Leioproctus
- Species: L. xanthozoster

Binomial name
- Leioproctus xanthozoster Maynard 1997

Species of bee

Leioproctus xanthozoster, or Leioproctus (Odontocolletes) xanthozoster, is a species of bee in the family Colletidae and subfamily Colletinae. It is endemic to Australia. It was described by Australian entomologist Glynn Maynard in 1997.

== Etymology ==
The specific epithet xanthozoster (Greek: "yellow-banded") is an anatomical reference to the metasoma.

== Description ==
Male body length is 8 mm. Integumental colouration is mainly black, with a narrow, subapical, orange band on the metasoma; the hair is mostly white to off-white.

== Distribution and habitat ==
The species occurs in arid central Australia. The type locality is 56 km south-east of Alice Springs, in the south of the Northern Territory. It has also been recorded from Welbourne Hill Station in northern South Australia.

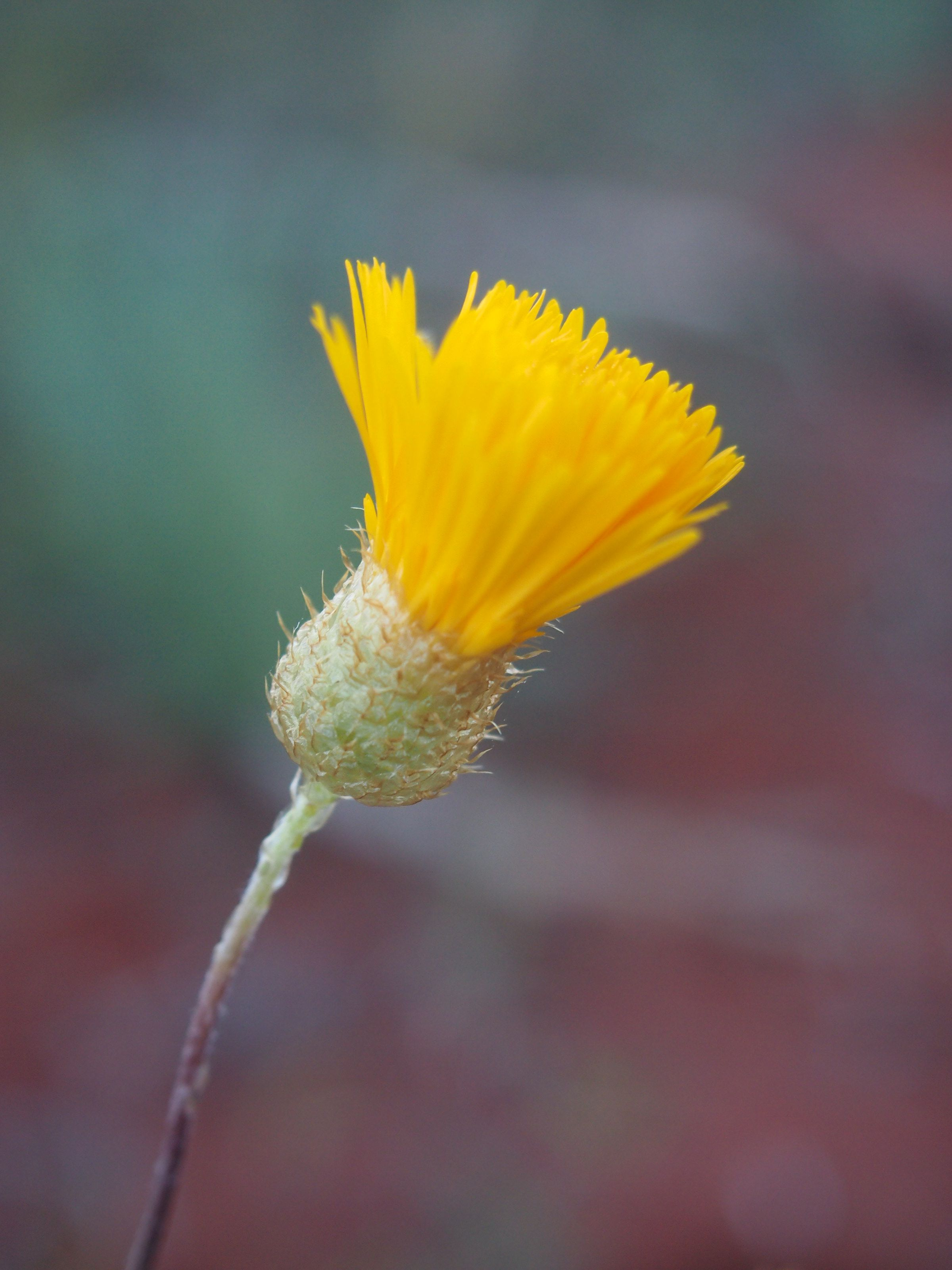
Podolepis canescens flower

== Behaviour ==
The adults are flying mellivores. Flowering plants visited by the bees include Podolepis canescens.

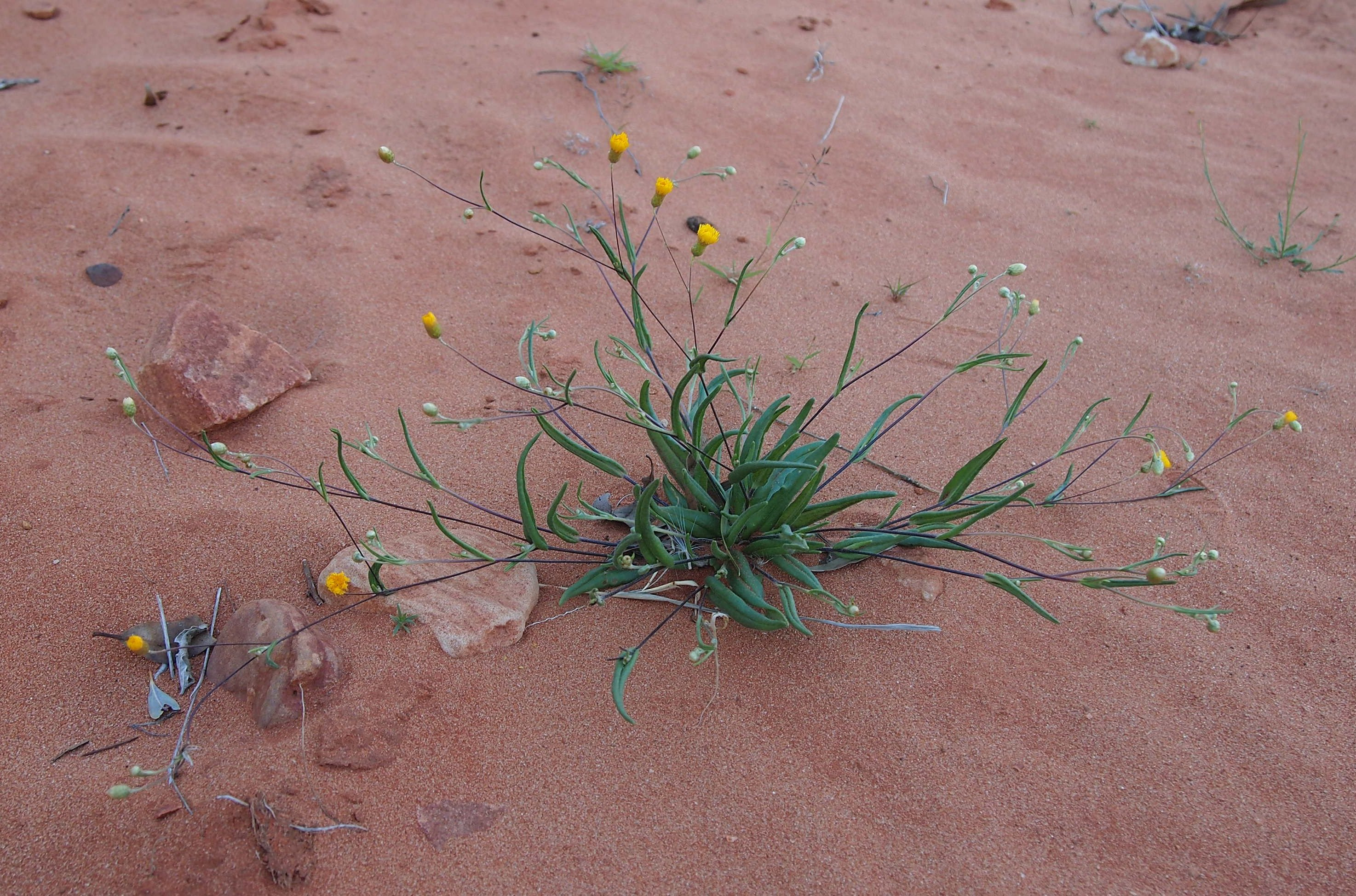
Podolepis canescens (large copper wire daisy), a forage plant of the bees
