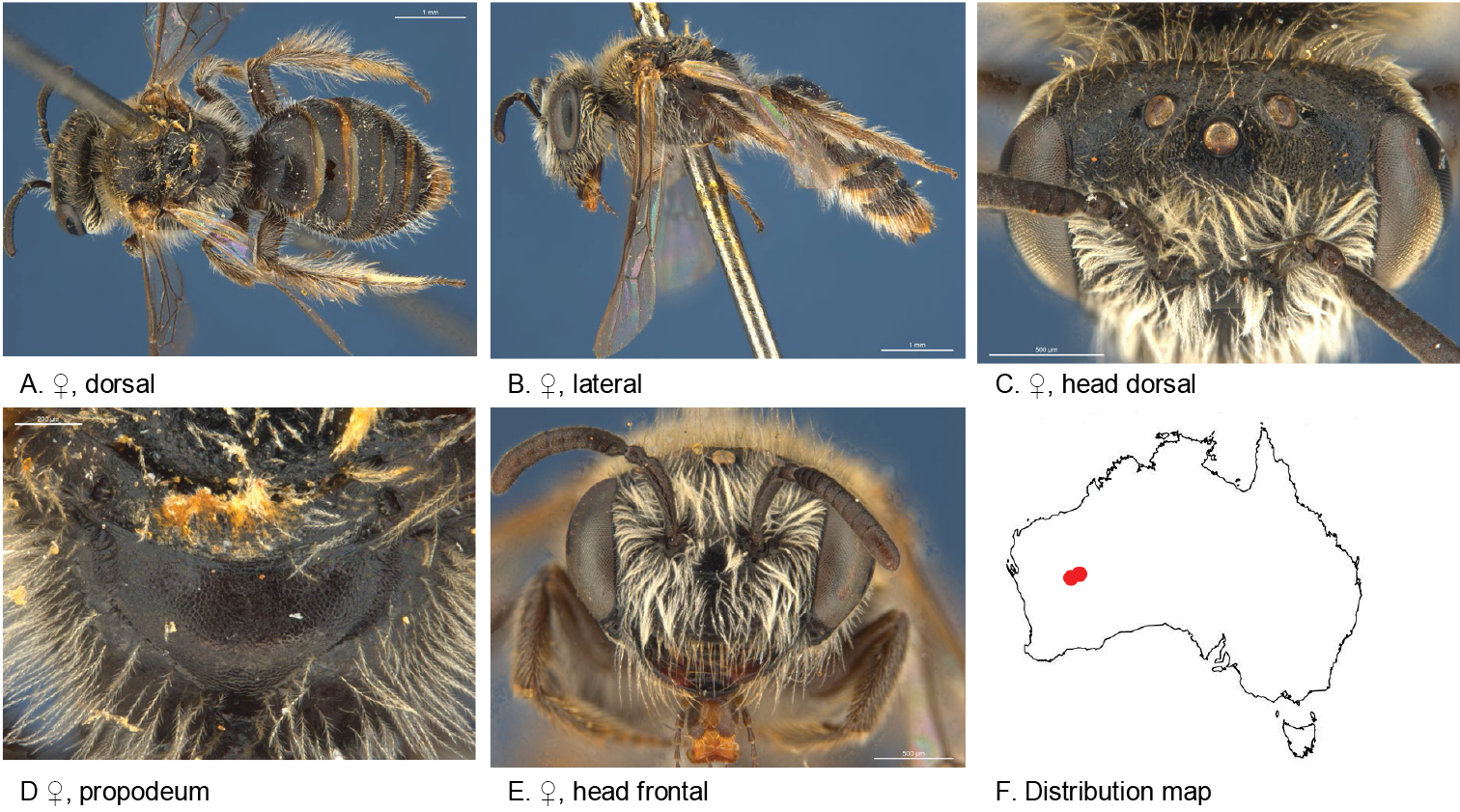
- Female holotype

Scientific classification
- Kingdom: Animalia
- Phylum: Arthropoda
- Clade: Pancrustacea
- Class: Insecta
- Order: Hymenoptera
- Family: Colletidae
- Genus: Leioproctus
- Species: L. consobrinus

Binomial name
- Leioproctus consobrinus Leijs 2018

= Leioproctus consobrinus =

Species of bee

Leioproctus consobrinus, or Leioproctus (Colletellus) consobrinus, is a species of bee in the family Colletidae and subfamily Colletinae. It is endemic to Australia. It was described by entomologist Remko Leijs in 2018.

== Etymology ==
The specific epithet consobrinus refers to the average L. (Colletellus) habitus of the species.

== Description ==
The female holotype body length is 6 mm, head width 2 mm. Integumental colouration is mainly black and brown. The hair is brown.

== Distribution and habitat ==
The species occurs in Western Australia. The type locality is 115 km north of Wiluna.

== Behaviour ==
The adults are flying mellivores. Flowering plants visited by the bees include Schoenia cassiniana as well as Pimelea species.

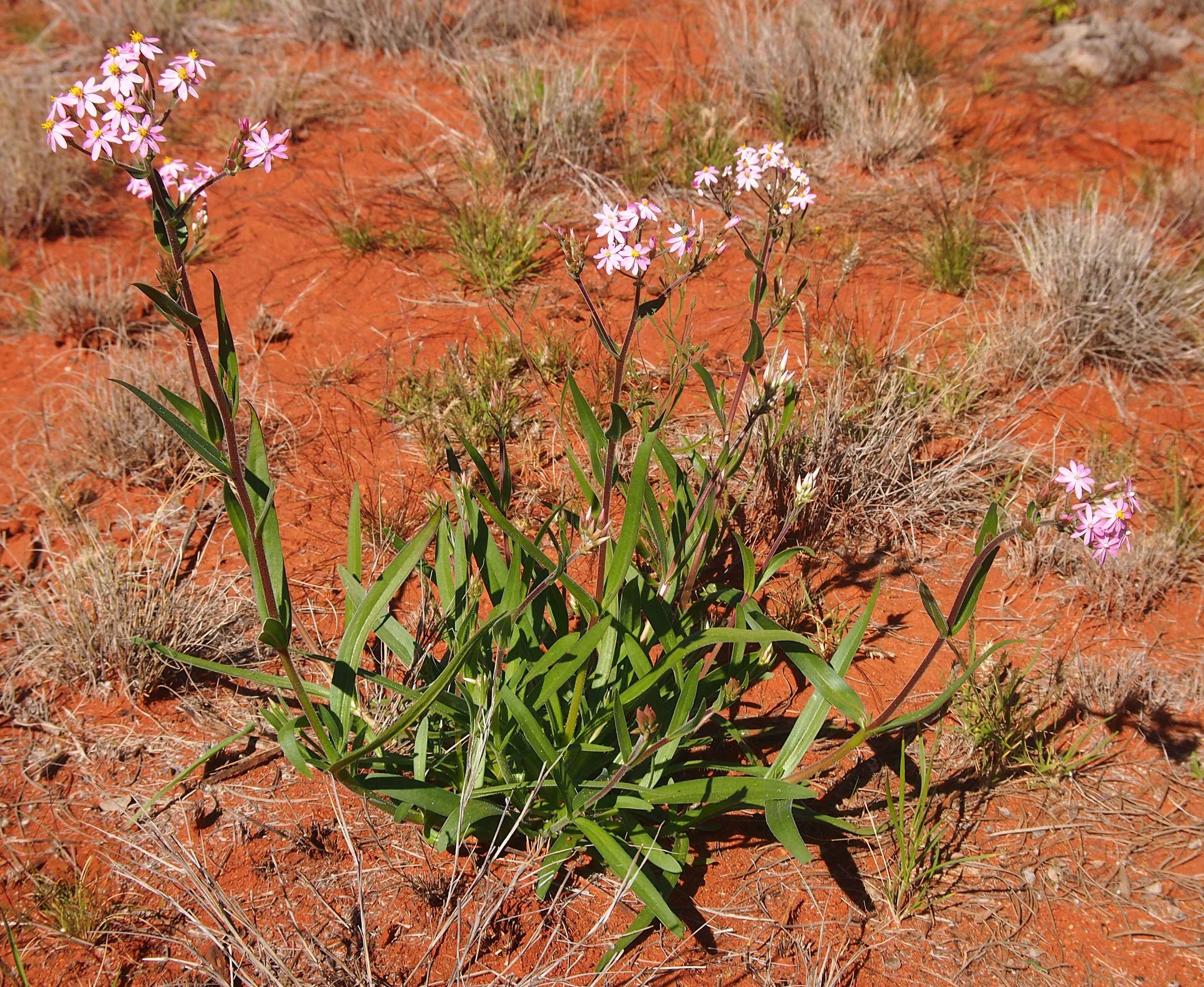
Schoenia cassiniana (pink everlasting), a forage plant of the bees

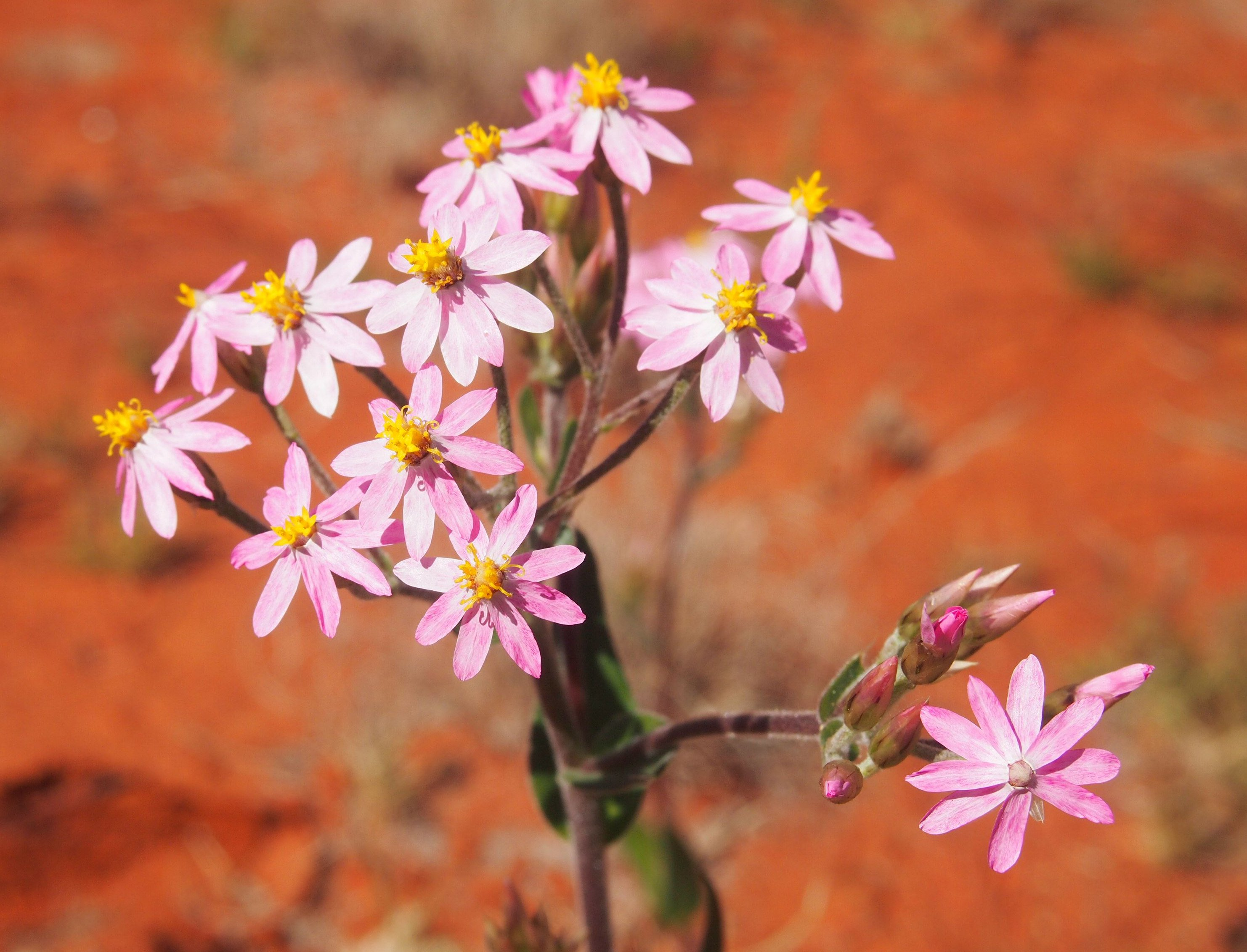
Schoenia cassiniana flowers
