= Mountain lettuce =

Mountain lettuce is a common name for several plants and may refer to:

- Lactuca perennis, native to Europe
- Podolepis robusta, native to Australia
