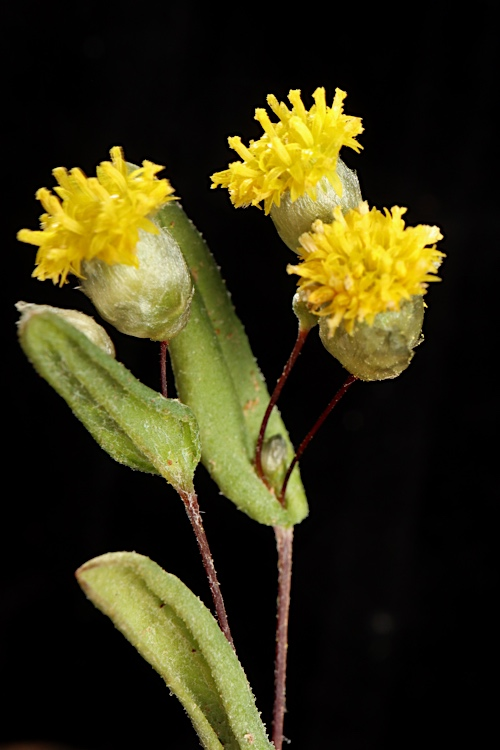

Scientific classification
- Kingdom: Plantae
- Clade: Embryophytes
- Clade: Tracheophytes
- Clade: Spermatophytes
- Clade: Angiosperms
- Clade: Eudicots
- Clade: Asterids
- Order: Asterales
- Family: Asteraceae
- Genus: Panaetia
- Species: P. muelleri

Binomial name
- Panaetia muelleri Sond.
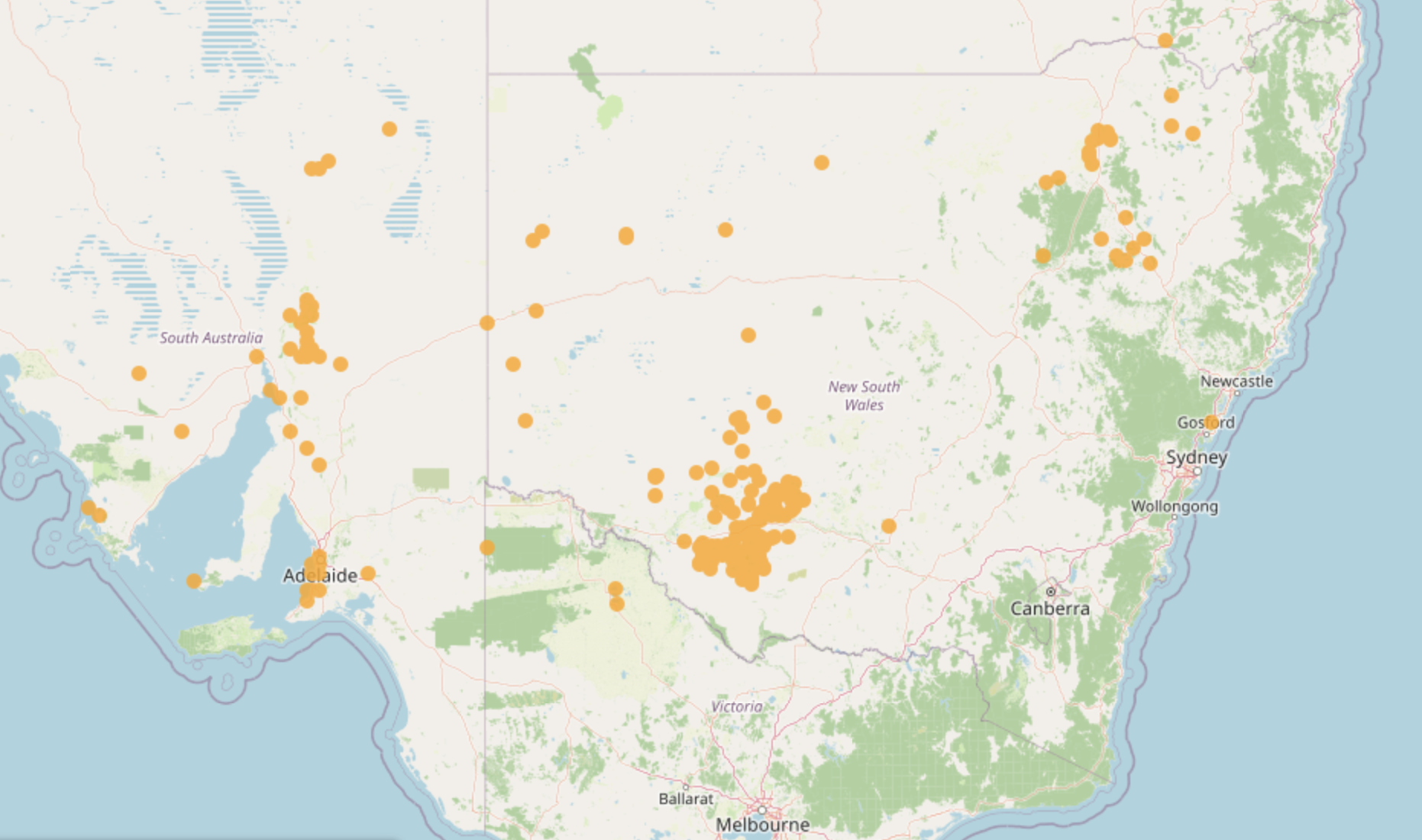
- Distribution of Panaetia muelleri

Synonyms
- Podolepis cupulata Maiden & Betche; Podolepis muelleri (Sond.) G.L.Davis

= Panaetia muelleri =

Species of flowering plant

Panaetia muelleri, commonly known as small copper-wire daisy, is a forb in the family Asteraceae. It is endemic to south-eastern Australia and occurs in New South Wales, Victoria and South Australia, where it grows in grasslands, woodlands and shrublands on heavy clay and stony soils.

== Taxonomy ==
Panaetia muelleri was first described by a German botanist, Otto Wilhelm Sonder in 1853. The species was previously named Podolepis muelleri and was later transferred back to the genus Panaetia after taxonomic revision of Australian daisies. The genus belongs to the family Asteraceae, one of the largest flowering plant families in the world.

== Etymology and naming ==
The genus name Panaetia comes from Panaetius of Rhodes, a Stoic philosopher of Ancient Greece. The specific epithet muelleri honours Baron Sir Ferdinand von Mueller (1825-1896), a German-Australian botanist, plant collector and former Government Botanist of Victoria who made significant contributions to the documentation of Australia's flora.

== Description ==
Panaetia muelleri is a woolly to almost hairless annual herb growing up to 22 cm (8.7 in) tall, with several sparsely branched stems. The basal leaves die off early. Stem leaves are lance-shaped, up to 4 cm (1.6 in) long, and clasp the stem.

Flower heads are few and arranged in an elongated cyme. The flower stalks do not have small scale-like leaves at their tips. The flower heads measure about 3.5–7 mm (0.14–0.28 in) across and 5–6 mm (0.20–0.24 in) long. The surrounding bracts are smooth and broadly oval in shape. The middle bracts are around 4 mm (0.16 in) long and have narrow, glandular bases, while the innermost bracts are joined together, forming a cup-like, leathery structure.

Florets are pale yellow to yellow. Outer florets are sterile, tubular, and lack a pappus. The inner bisexual florets possess more than ten plumose pappus bristles which extend beyond the involucre and have a short, feathery (plumose) pappus.

== Distribution and habitat ==
Panaetia muelleri is found across inland and semi-arid regions of New South Wales, South Australia and in small parts of north-western Victoria. It inhabits open woodland, grassland, and saltbush shrubland communities, usually on heavy clay soils or stony sites. The species is generally associated with open habitats that have low vegetation cover and limited competition from larger perennial plants.

== Ecology ==
Panaetia muelleri is an annual species adapted to open environments in semi-arid and temperate regions of south-eastern Australia. It commonly occurs in disturbed or naturally open habitats where seasonal rainfall promotes germination and growth. Flowering generally occurs from late winter to spring, with peak flowering recorded between August and October.

== Reproduction and dispersal ==
As an annual herb, Panaetia muelleri completes its life cycle within a single growing season and reproduces entirely by seed. The fruits contain small seeds bearing a short plumose pappus, a characteristic of many members of the Asteraceae. The fruits bear myxogenic cells that swell when wet and may adhere to animals, suggesting that animal-mediated dispersal may be important in the species.

== Conservation status ==
Panaetia muelleri is considered vulnerable in South Australia and critically endangered in Victoria. Although the species is considered threatened in parts of its range, it was assigned a low conservation priority in the Hills and Fleurieu Landscape Board's Action Plan for Threatened Species and Ecological Communities 2026–2040. The plan identifies habitat loss and fragmentation, invasive species, altered fire regimes, disease and climate change as major threats to threatened species and ecological communities in the region. These factors may also affect P. muelleri, particularly where populations are small, isolated or occur in fragmented habitats.
