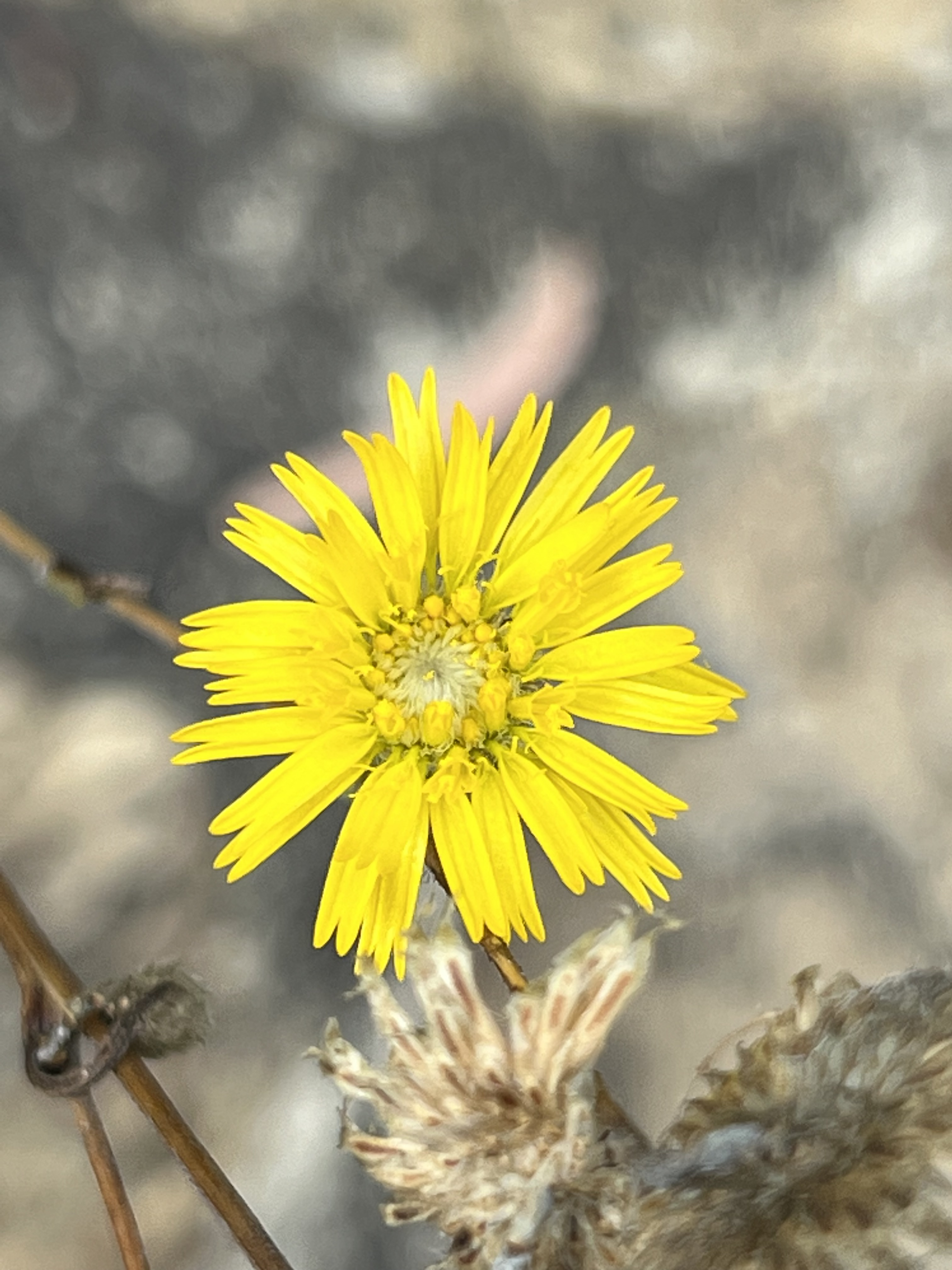

Scientific classification
- Kingdom: Plantae
- Clade: Tracheophytes
- Clade: Angiosperms
- Clade: Eudicots
- Clade: Asterids
- Order: Asterales
- Family: Asteraceae
- Genus: Podolepis
- Species: P. hieracioides

Binomial name
- Podolepis hieracioides Muell.

= Podolepis hieracioides =

Long podolepis

Species of herb

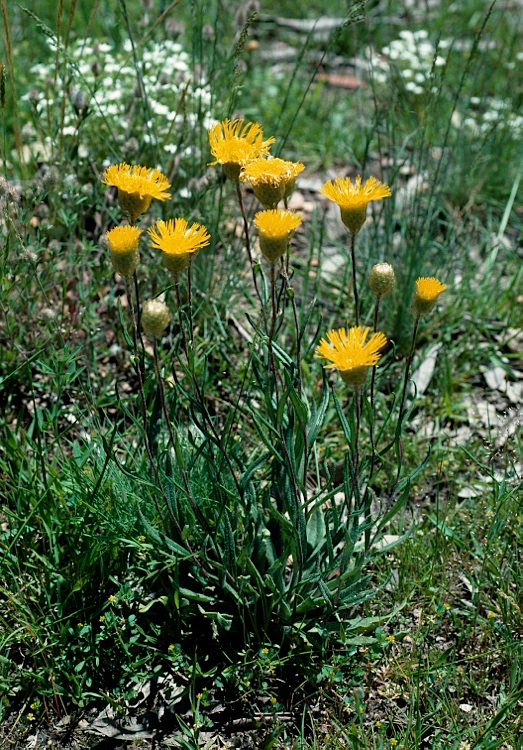
Habit

Podolepis hieracioides commonly known as long podolepis, is a flowering plant in the family Asteraceae and grows in New South Wales and Victoria. It is a small perennial with yellow flowers.

== Description ==
Podolepis hieracioides is an upright, glabrous or woolly, bristly, sparingly branched perennial to 70 cm (28 in) high with a single or several stems. The basal leaves are lance or elliptic-shaped, up to 16 cm (6.3 in) long, stem-clasping, sessile and pointed at the apex. The leaves higher on the stems are narrowly lance-shaped to linear and up to 13 cm (5.1 in) long, rough to smooth, margins flat to rolled under, basal leaves elliptic The flower heads are borne in groupings of 2–6 in a scant elongated cyme, 15–20 mm (0.59–0.79 in) in diameter and 15 mm (0.59 in) long. The bracts are oval-shaped, smooth, middle bracts with thick glandular claws, 8.5 mm (0.33 in) long, slightly covered by adjoining bracts and the 15-30 florets pale yellow. Flowering occurs from December to April and the fruit is dry, one-seeded, bristly and 2–3 mm (0.079–0.118 in) long.

== Taxonomy ==
Podolepis hieracioides was first formally described in 1859 by Ferdinand von Mueller and the description was published in Fragmenta Phytographiae Australiae.

== Distribution and habitat ==
Long podolepis grows in soils at lower altitudes or in shallow soils on hills mostly south of the Blue Mountains in New South Wales. In eastern Victoria it grows in subalpine and montane locations in grassland, woodlands and forests.
