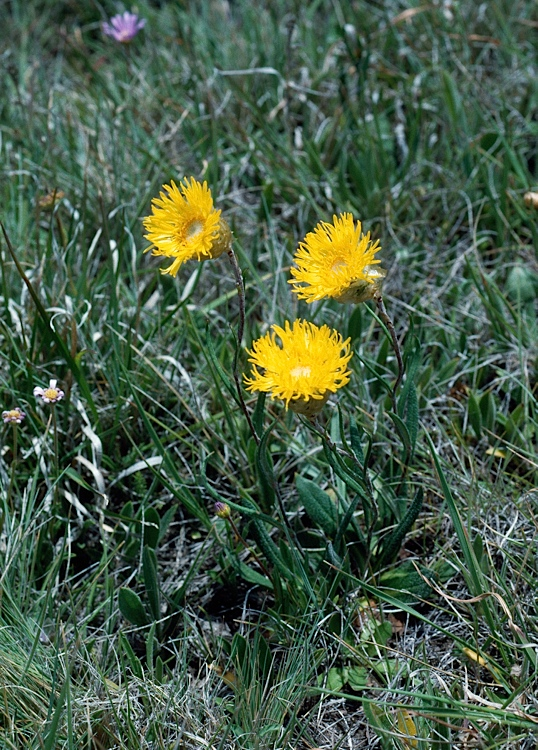

Scientific classification
- Kingdom: Plantae
- Clade: Embryophytes
- Clade: Tracheophytes
- Clade: Spermatophytes
- Clade: Angiosperms
- Clade: Eudicots
- Clade: Asterids
- Order: Asterales
- Family: Asteraceae
- Genus: Podolepis
- Species: P. decipiens

Binomial name
- Podolepis decipiens Jeanes

= Podolepis decipiens =

Deceiving copper wire-daisy

Species of herb

Podolepis decipiens, commonly known as deceiving copperwire-daisy, is a flowering plant in the family Asteraceae and grows in Victoria, Tasmania and New South Wales. It is an upright, perennial herb with yellow daisy-like flowers on a single stem rising from a sparse rosette.

== Description ==
Podolepis decipiens is a perennial herb to 70 cm (28 in) high with a single upright or several woolly stems from a rootstock that is renewed yearly. The leaves are covered sparsely to densely with flattened hairs, margins more or less flat to rolled under, upper surface rough, basal leaves in a sparse rosette, lance, oblong, oval or egg-shaped, 3–20 cm (1.2–7.9 in) long, 5–30 mm (0.20–1.18 in) wide, leaves toward apex stem-clasping, sessile, mostly linear to linear to lance-shaped, usually 1–10 cm (0.39–3.94 in) long and 2–15 mm (0.079–0.591 in) wide. The flowers are bright yellow or orange, usually single, with 20-40 fringed petals, mostly 20–40 mm (0.79–1.57 in) in diameter, bracts papery in several rows and on a peduncle 4–10 cm (1.6–3.9 in) long. Flowering occurs from August to February and the fruit is a cypsela 2–4 mm (0.079–0.157 in) long, about 1 mm (0.039 in) wide and covered with barbed bristles.

== Taxonomy and naming ==
Podolepis decipiens was first formally described in 2015 by Jeffrey A. Jeanes and the description was published in Muelleria. The specific epithet (decipiens) means "deceiving" because in has been confused with Podolepis jaceoides.

== Distribution and habitat ==
Deceiving copper wire-daisy is a widespread species found in a variety of habitats including grasslands, woodlands, forests, alpine and near coastal locations in New South Wales, Victoria, Tasmania, South Australia and Queensland.
