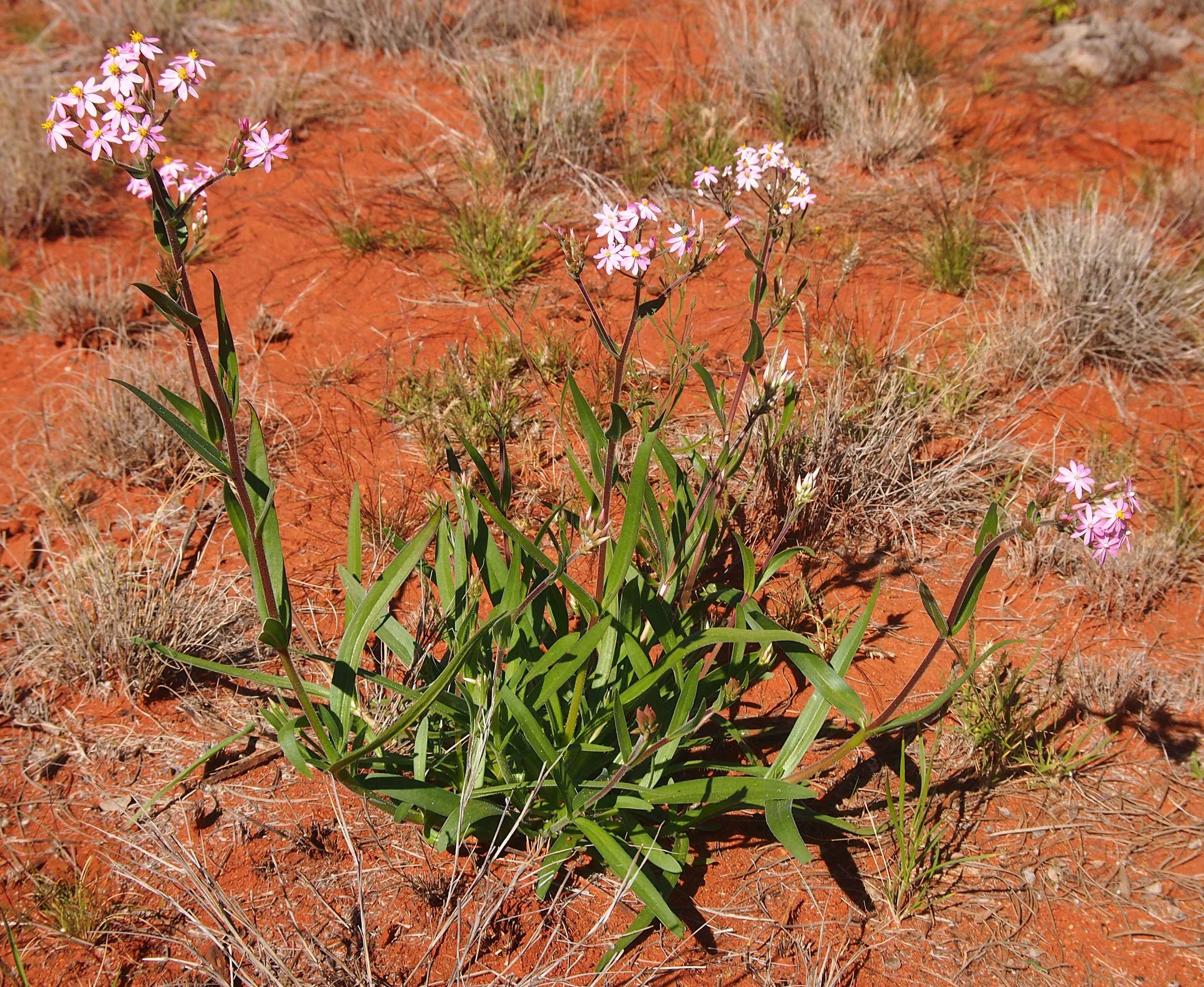
- Schoenia cassiniana

Scientific classification
- Kingdom: Plantae
- Clade: Tracheophytes
- Clade: Angiosperms
- Clade: Eudicots
- Clade: Asterids
- Order: Asterales
- Family: Asteraceae
- Subfamily: Asteroideae
- Tribe: Gnaphalieae
- Genus: Schoenia; Steetz

Type species
- Schoenia oppositifolia Steetz

Synonyms
- Helichrysum filifolium (Turcz.) F.Muell.; Xanthochrysum filifolium Turcz.

= Schoenia =

Genus of plants

Schoenia is a genus of Australian plants in the tribe Gnaphalieae within the family Asteraceae.

Species list The following is a list of Schoenia species accepted by the Australian Plant Census as at October 2022:

- Schoenia ayersii (F.Muell.) J.M.Black
- Schoenia cassiniana (Gaudich.) Steetz
- Schoenia filifolia (Turcz.) Paul G.Wilson
  - Schoenia filifolia subsp. arenicola Paul G.Wilson
  - Schoenia filifolia (Turcz.) Paul G.Wilsonsubsp. filifolia
  - Schoenia filifolia subsp. subulifolia (F.Muell.) Paul G.Wilson
- Schoenia macivorii (F.Muell.) Paul G.Wilson
- Schoenia ramosissima (F.Muell.) Paul G.Wilson
