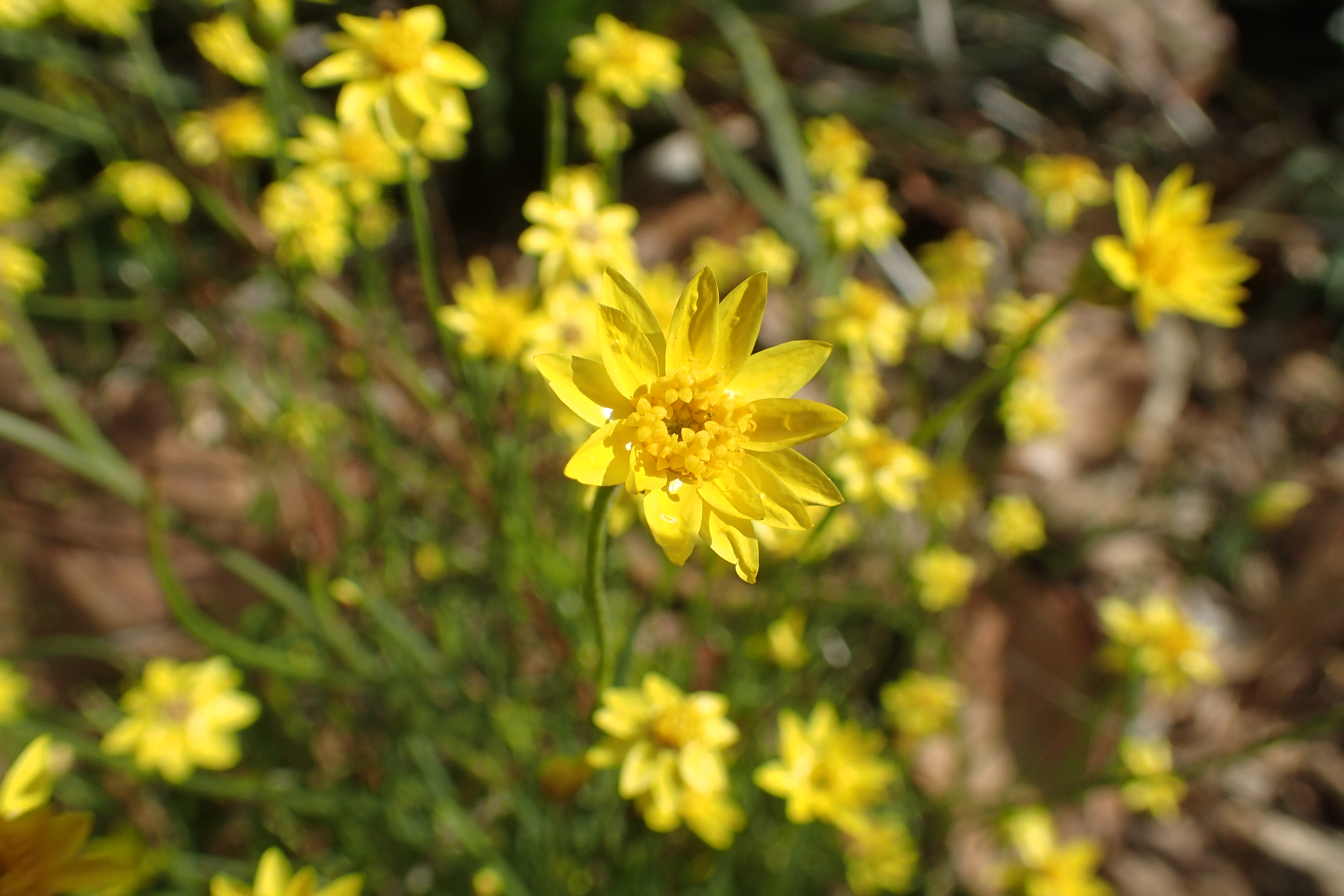

Scientific classification
- Kingdom: Plantae
- Clade: Tracheophytes
- Clade: Angiosperms
- Clade: Eudicots
- Clade: Asterids
- Order: Asterales
- Family: Asteraceae
- Genus: Schoenia
- Species: S. filifolia

Binomial name
- Schoenia filifolia (Turcz.) Paul G.Wilson

Synonyms
- Helichrysum filifolium (Turcz.) F.Muell.; Xanthochrysum filifolium Turcz.

= Schoenia filifolia =

Species of flowering plant

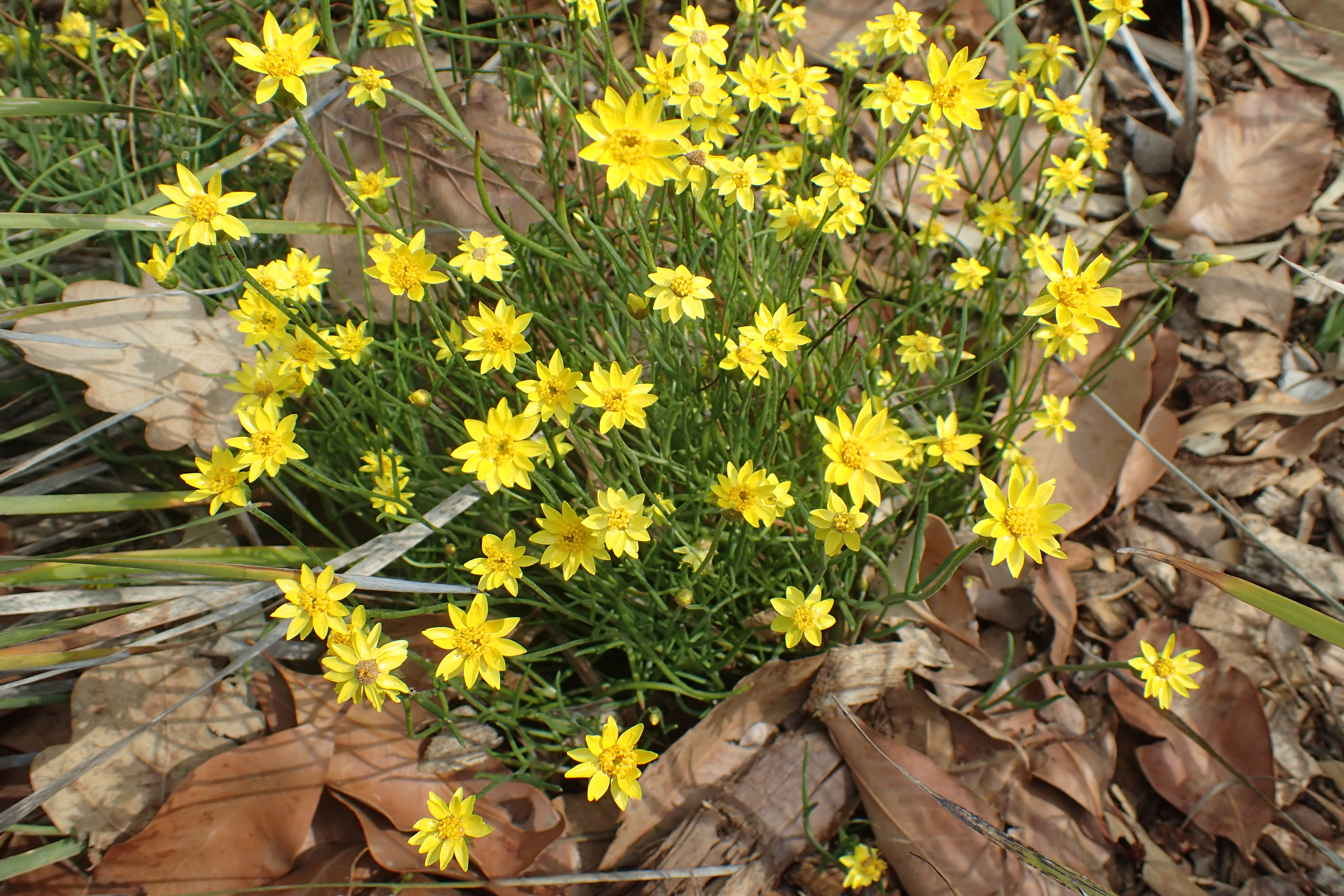
Habit in Kings Park

Schoenia filifolia is a species of flowering plant in the family Asteraceae, and is endemic to the southwest of Western Australia. It is an annual herb with terete leaves and yellow, daisy-like inflorescences.

== Description ==
Schoenia filifolia is an annual herb that typically grows to a height of up to 50 cm (20 in) and has terete leaves. The heads or daisy-like "flowers" are yellow with a top-shaped to cylindrical or hemispherical involucre, depending on subspecies, the involucral bracts in five series.

== Taxonomy ==
This species was first formally described in 1851 by Nikolai Turczaninow who gave it the name Xanthochrysum filifolium in the Bulletin de la Société Impériale des Naturalistes de Moscou from specimens collected by James Drummond. In 1992, Paul Graham Wilson changed the name to Schoenia filifolia in the journal Nuytsia. The specific epithet (filifolia) means "thread-leaved".

In the same edition of Nuytsia, Wilson described three subspecies of S. filifolia and the names are accepted by the Australian Plant Census:

- Schoenia filifolia subsp. arenicola Paul G.Wilson is an erect, annual herb, the heads of flowers arranged in an open corymb, the involucre cylindrical with the innermost bracts yellow, the ray florets 3–6 mm (0.12–0.24 in) long, flowering in August and September and the fruit a terete achene.
- Schoenia filifolia (Turcz.) Paul G.Wilsonsubsp. filifolia is an erect, often multi-stemmed, annual herb, the involucre top-shaped with the innermost bracts white, the ray florets 3–6 mm (0.12–0.24 in) long, flowering from July to November, and the fruit an oval achene.
- Schoenia filifolia subsp. subulifolia (F.Muell.) Paul G.Wilson is an annual herb, the involucre hemispherical, the ray florets 7–10 mm (0.28–0.39 in) long, flowering in September and October, and the fruit an achene that is longer and hairier than those of the other two subspecies.

== Distribution and habitat ==
Schoenia filifolia grows in swampy flats, on salt flats, near-coastal sand ridges and in valley flats in the Avon Wheatbelt, Carnarvon, Coolgardie, Geraldton Sandplains, Mallee and Murchison bioregions of western and south-western Western Australia. Subspecies arenicola seems to be confined to sandhills in the Carnarvon area, subsp. filifolia grows in saline areas between Mullewa, Kalgoorlie and Lake Barker, and subsp. subulifolia occurs in the Geraldton area.

== Conservation status ==
Subspecies filifolia is listed as "not threatened" but subsp. arenicola is classified as "Priority One", meaning that it is known from only one or a few locations which are potentially at risk, and subsp. subulifera as "Threatened" by the Western Australian Government Department of Biodiversity, Conservation and Attractions, meaning that it is in danger of extinction.
