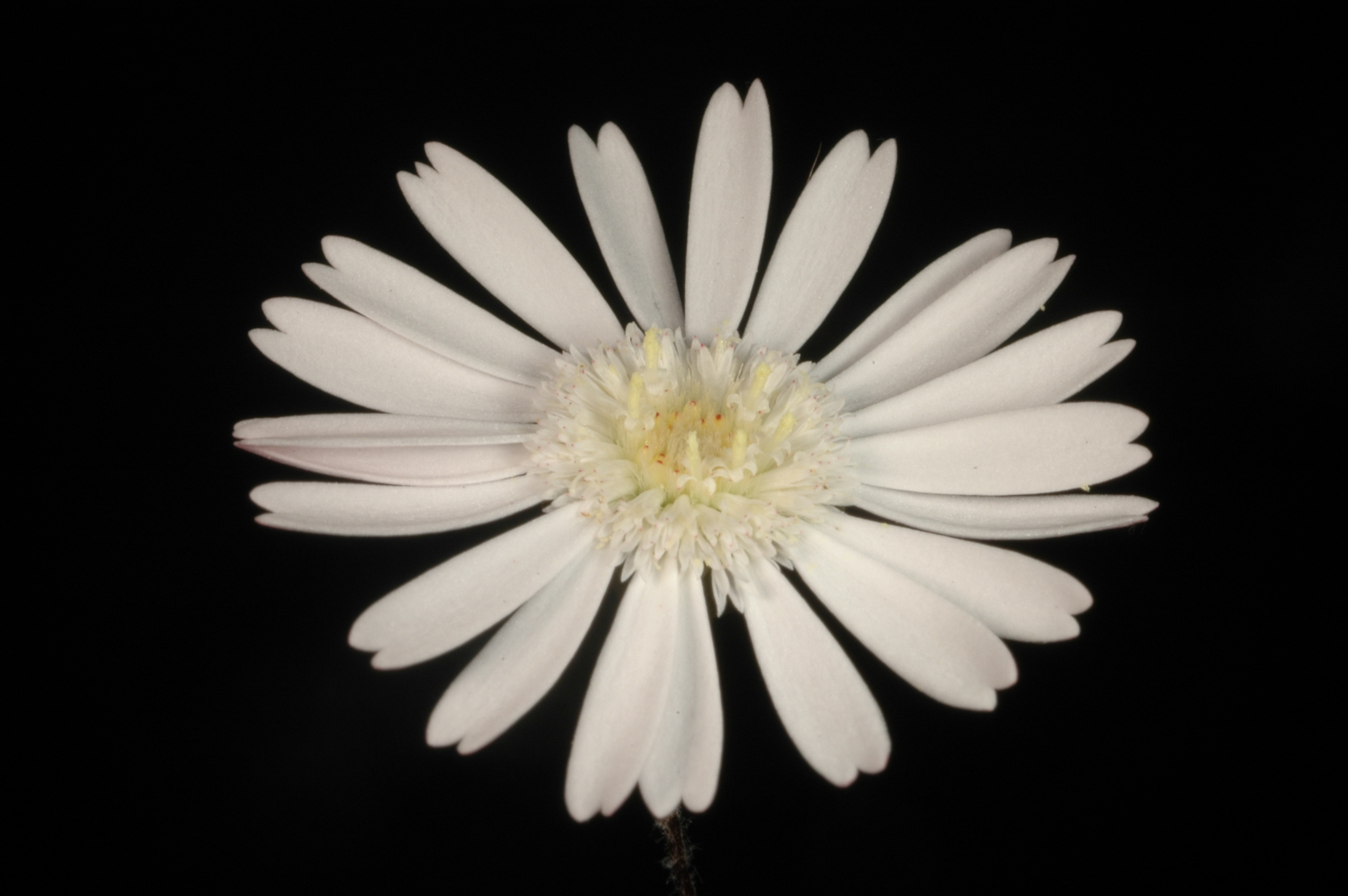

Scientific classification
- Kingdom: Plantae
- Clade: Tracheophytes
- Clade: Angiosperms
- Clade: Eudicots
- Clade: Asterids
- Order: Asterales
- Family: Asteraceae
- Genus: Podolepis
- Species: P. gracilis

Binomial name
- Podolepis gracilis Graham

Synonyms
- Podolepis angustifolia Anon. Podolepis filiformis Steetz; Podolepis rosea Steetz; Podolepis rosea var. mollissima Steetz; Podolepis spenceri Ewart; Scalia gracilis Kuntze; Stylolepis gracilis Lehm. Stylolepis gracilis var. arachnoidea Lehm. Stylolepis gracilis var. glabra Lehm.

= Podolepis gracilis =

Member of the daisy family, native to WA

Podolepis gracilis (common name slender podolepis) is a slender, perennial herb native to Western Australia, belonging to the Asteraceae family.

== Taxonomy ==
The species was first described in 1828 by Robert Graham based on plant material grown from seed said to have been collected in New South Wales and sent to England by Charles Fraser, the NSW colonial botanist.

== Description ==
Graham described the plant as follows:

Root descending, tapering, having short, lateral, branching fibres, annual. Stem erect, slender, very slightly compressed, smooth and shining, slightly flexuose, branched; branches suberect, resembling the stem. Leaves 3-nerved, central nerve keeled behind, glabrous, shining, somewhat succulent, quite entire, sessile and stem clasping, the lower (3½ inches long, ¾ of an inch broad) ovato-oblong, with a short central point, the upper ovato-acuminate, and gradually becoming smaller towards the flowers. Flowers radiate, terminal or axillary. Peduncles (3-4 inches) long, filiform, and resembling the branches, which, indeed, they should perhaps be considered, as they have distantly scattered along them abortive flower-buds, each covered with an inconspicuous leaf resembling a bractea. Anthodium ovate, imbricated, dry, membranous, shining, greenish, when withered pale brown; scales ovate, entire, having a distinct middle rib occasionally projecting at the apex in form of a little mucro, on rough footstalks, in the inner scales as long as themselves, but shorter in the outer, which are loose, and extended a little way on the peduncle. Receptacle naked, tubercled. Florets of the disk (nearly ¾ of an inch long) hermaphrodite, rose-coloured, especially at their apices, divaricated, and projecting outwards between the tubes of the ray, regular, 5-cleft, segments spreading. Anther-tube included, bursting at its apex, and discharging white pollen; filaments nearly as long as the anthers, inserted into the corolla above the middle of the tube. Ray at first rose coloured, but soon fading to white, spreading, (1¼ inch across,) corollulae ligulate; tube (⅜ths of an inch long) filiform; limb equal in length to the tube, linear-oblong, cordate at the apex, bi-nerved. Seeds small, leaden coloured, lanceolate-oblong, dotted, slightly tomentose, having at the base an umbilicus, which is circular, white, slightly excavated, with prominent edges; many abortive. Pappus simple, rough, nearly equal, half the length of the tube of the ray, two-thirds of that of the disk.
