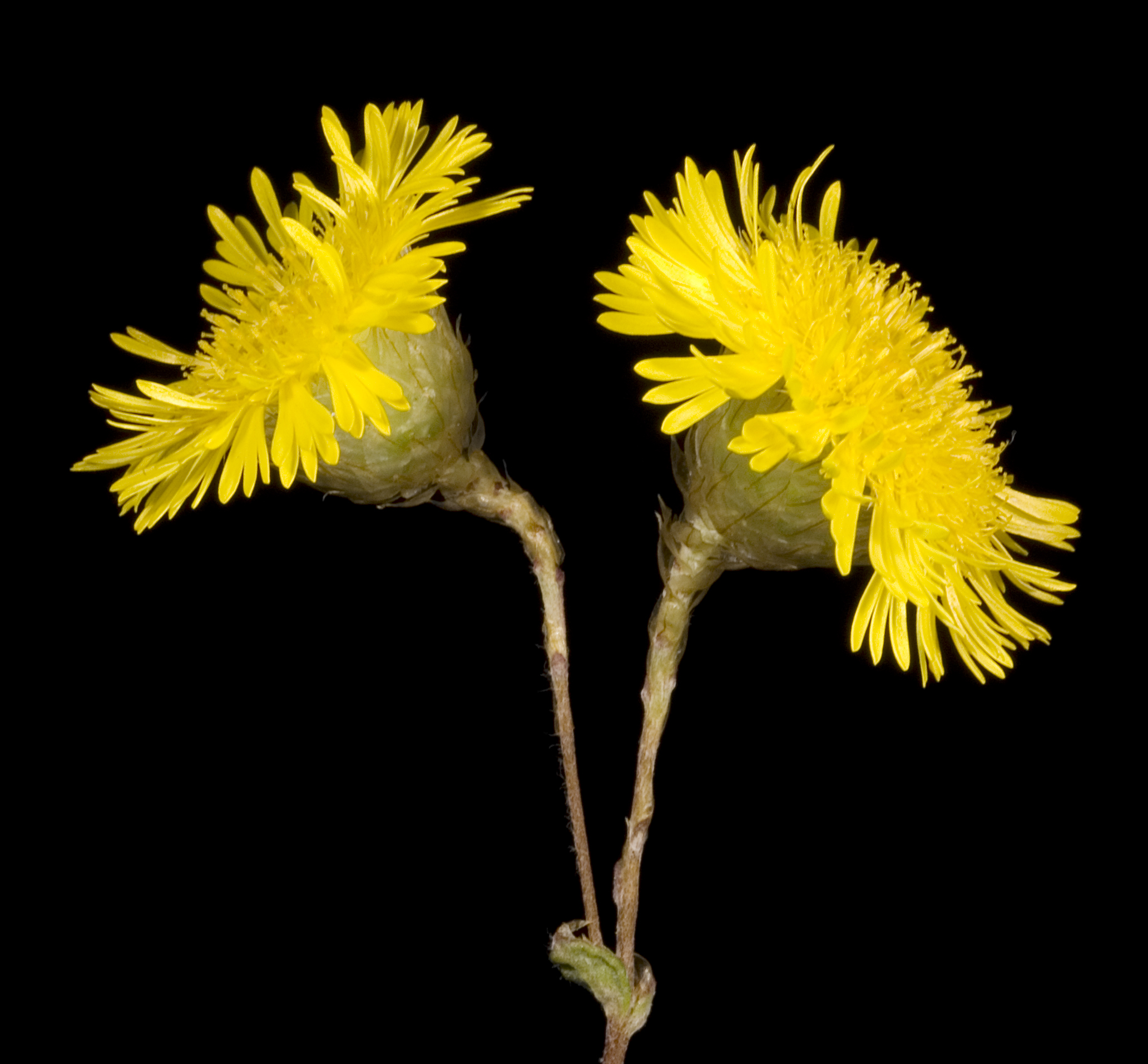
- Podolepis aristata subsp. aristata

Scientific classification
- Kingdom: Plantae
- Clade: Tracheophytes
- Clade: Angiosperms
- Clade: Eudicots
- Clade: Asterids
- Order: Asterales
- Family: Asteraceae
- Genus: Podolepis
- Species: P. aristata

Binomial name
- Podolepis aristata Benth.

Synonyms
- Podolepis aristata var. chrysantha (Endl.) Steetz; Podolepis aristata var. minor Benth. Podolepis chrysantha Endl.

= Podolepis aristata =

Species of herb

Podolepis aristata is a herb in the Asteraceae family, which is found in Western Australia, and all mainland states and territories of Australia.

It was first described in 1837 by George Bentham, from a specimen collected on the Swan River, in Western Australia.
