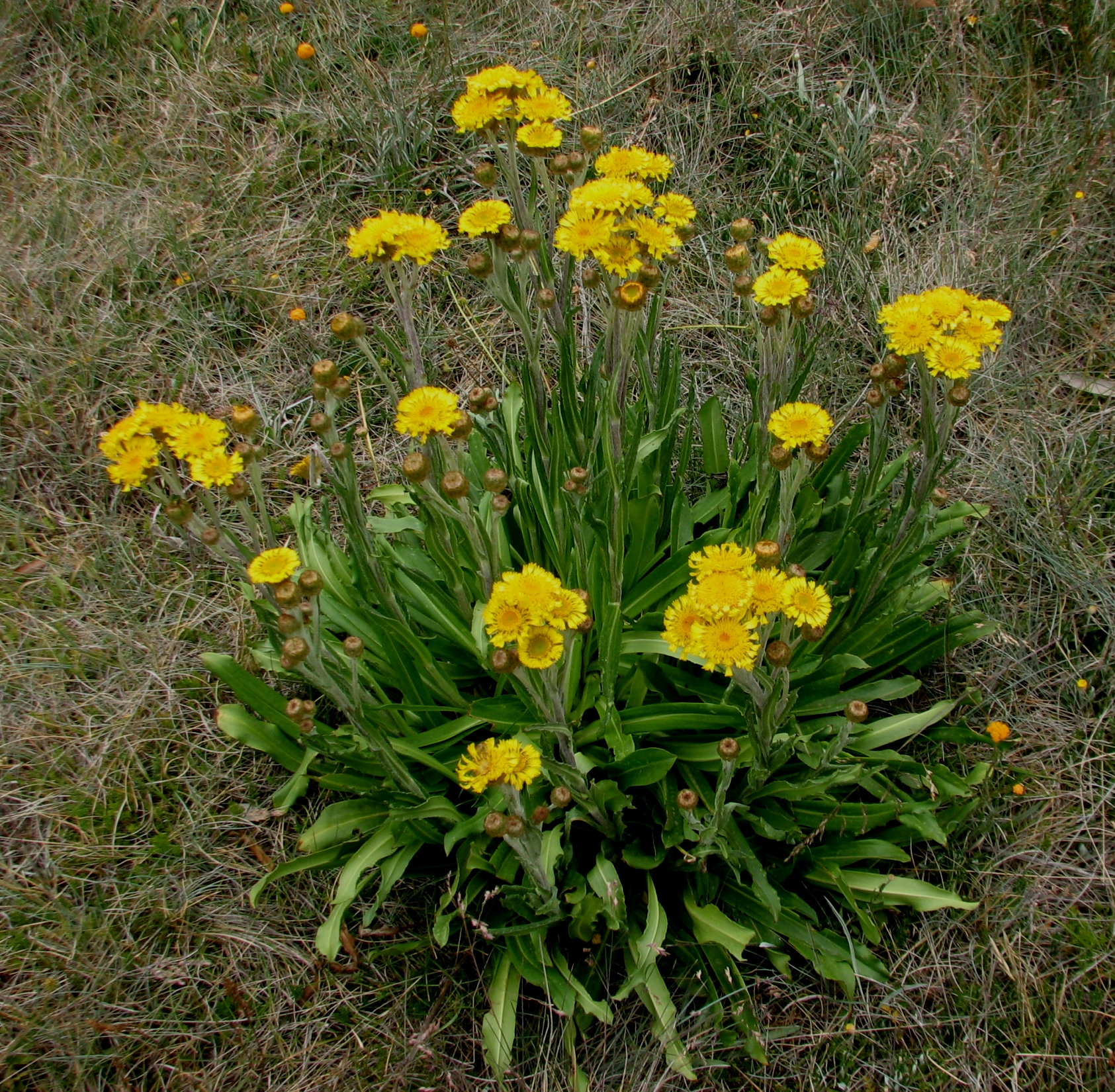
- Podolepis robusta Alpine National Park, Victoria

Scientific classification
- Kingdom: Plantae
- Clade: Tracheophytes
- Clade: Angiosperms
- Clade: Eudicots
- Clade: Asterids
- Order: Asterales
- Family: Asteraceae
- Genus: Podolepis
- Species: P. robusta

Binomial name
- Podolepis robusta (Maiden & Betche) J.H.Willis

Synonyms
- Podolepis longipedata var. robusta Maiden & Betche; Podolepis acuminata var. robusta (Maiden & Betche) J.H.Willis

= Podolepis robusta =

Species of plant

Podolepis robusta, commonly known as alpine podolepis, mountain lettuce or cattleman's lettuce, is a perennial herb from the Australian Alps in the family Asteraceae.

== Description ==
The species has a thick, upright single stem and reaches up to 60 cm in height, with yellow inflorescences that are around 25 mm in diameter. These appear in summer. Spathulate basal leaves clasp the stem and are up to 20 cm in length. Leaves on the stem above these are smaller and decrease in size with height.

== Taxonomy ==
The species was initially described in 1898 as Podolepis longipedata var. robusta based on plant material collected from Australia's highest mountain, Mount Kosciuszko. In 1942, it was renamed as Podolepis acuminata var. robusta by botanist Jim Willis. He elevated it to species status in 1954.

== Distribution ==
Podolepis robusta is found in alpine grassland, commonly in association with snow gums. It occurs in the Australian Alps, southwards from Mount Gingera in the Australian Capital Territory.
