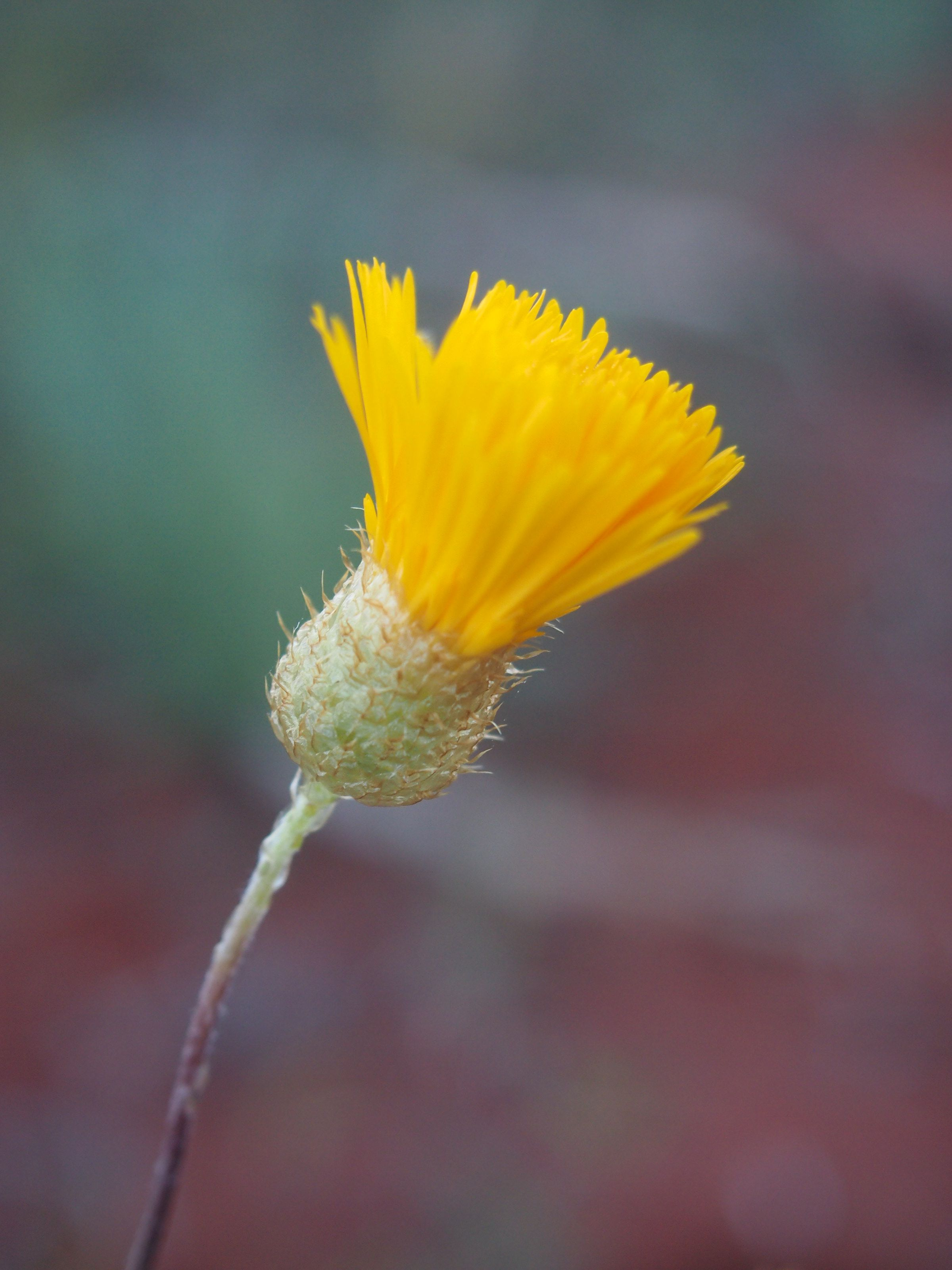

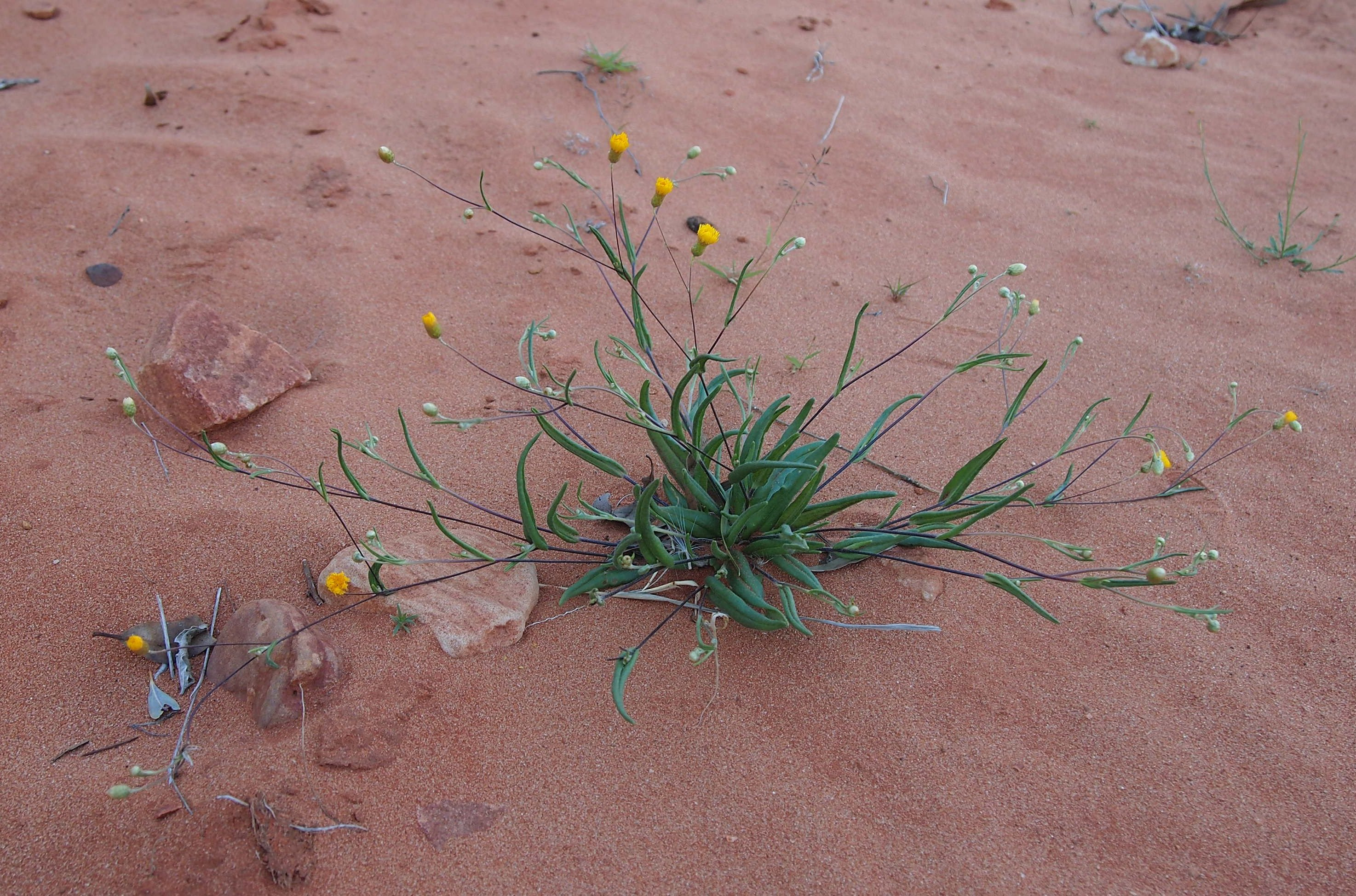

Scientific classification
- Kingdom: Plantae
- Clade: Tracheophytes
- Clade: Angiosperms
- Clade: Eudicots
- Clade: Asterids
- Order: Asterales
- Family: Asteraceae
- Genus: Podolepis
- Species: P. canescens

Binomial name
- Podolepis canescens A.Cunn. ex DC.

Synonyms
- Podolepis affinis Sond. Podolepis aristata subsp. affinis (Sond.) Jeanes; Podolepis inundata A.Cunn. Scalia canescens Kuntze

= Podolepis canescens =

Species of herb

Podolepis canescens (common names - grey podolepis, large copper wire daisy) is a herb in the Asteraceae family, which is found in South Australia, the Northern Territory, New South Wales and Victoria. PlantNet also states that it is found in Western Australia, but FloraBase states that the name is misapplied in Western Australia, based on Jeanes (2015).

It was first described in 1838 by Allan Cunningham and published in Augustin Pyramus de Candolle's Prodromus Systematis Naturalis Regni Vegetabilis. Jeffrey Jeanes (2015) recognises only specimens from New South Wales as belonging to the species.
