= Schoenia cassiniana =

Pink everlasting

Conservation status
- Least Concern (TPWCA)

Scientific classification
- Kingdom: Plantae
- Clade: Tracheophytes
- Clade: Angiosperms
- Clade: Eudicots
- Clade: Asterids
- Order: Asterales
- Family: Asteraceae
- Genus: Schoenia
- Species: S. cassiniana

Binomial name
- Schoenia cassiniana (Gaudich.) Steetz

Synonyms
- Helichrysum cassinianum Gaudich. Helipterum cassinianum (Gaudich.) DC. Pteropogon cassinianus (Gaudich.) F.Muell. Pteropogon oppositifolius (Steetz) Lehm. Schoenia oppositifolia Steetz

Species of flowering plant

Schoenia cassiniana commonly known as pink everlasting is a species of flowering plant in the family Asteraceae and native to Western Australia, South Australia and the Northern Territory.It is an upright herb with pink flowers.

== Description ==
It is an annual herb, growing to heights of 7 cm to 70 cm on sandy, loamy, clay and stony soils. Its pink and yellow flowers may be seen from June to November.

== Taxonomy ==
It was first described in 1829 by Charles Gaudichaud-Beaupré as Helichrysum cassinianum, but was transferred to the genus Schoenia in 1845 by Joachim Steetz.

== Gallery ==
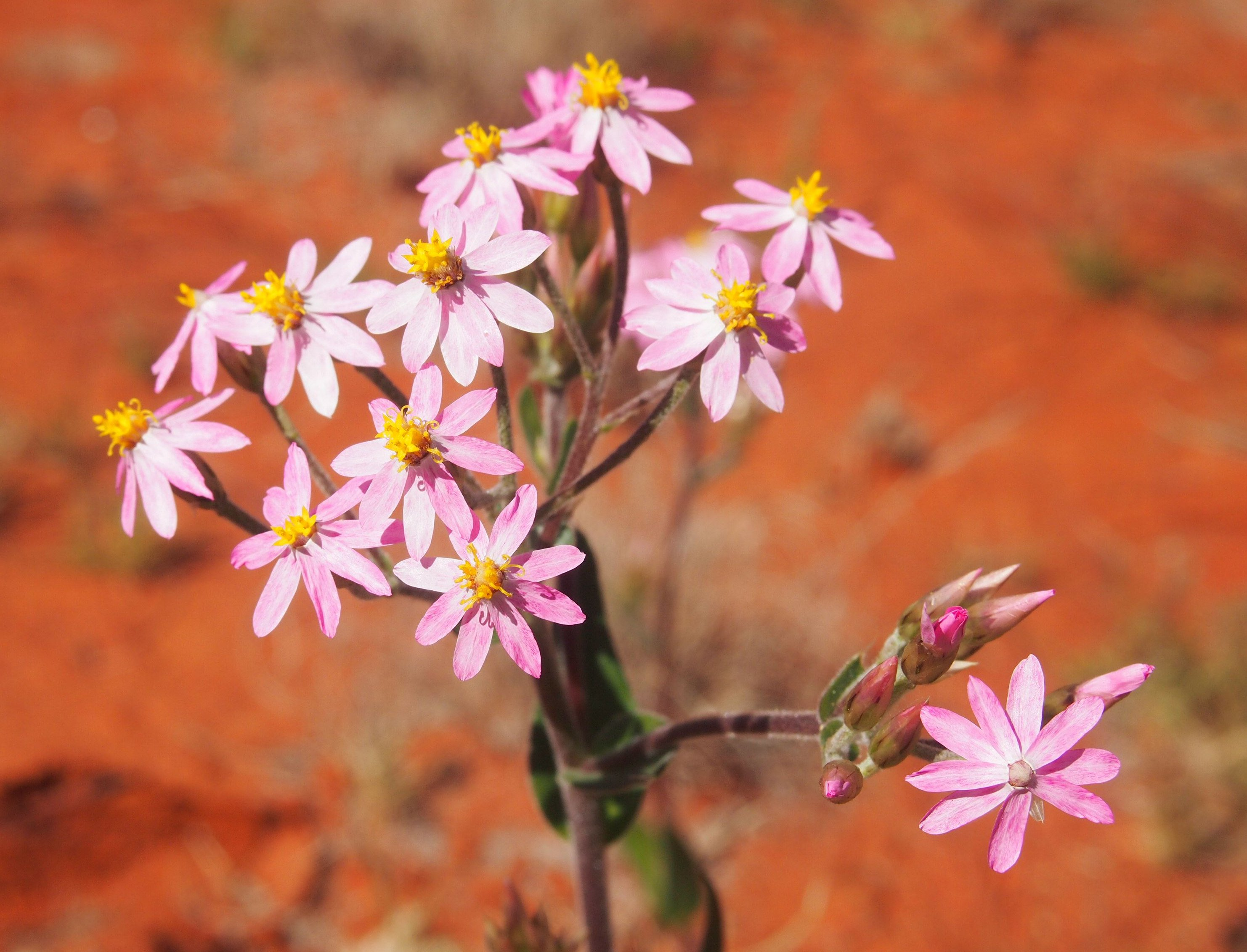

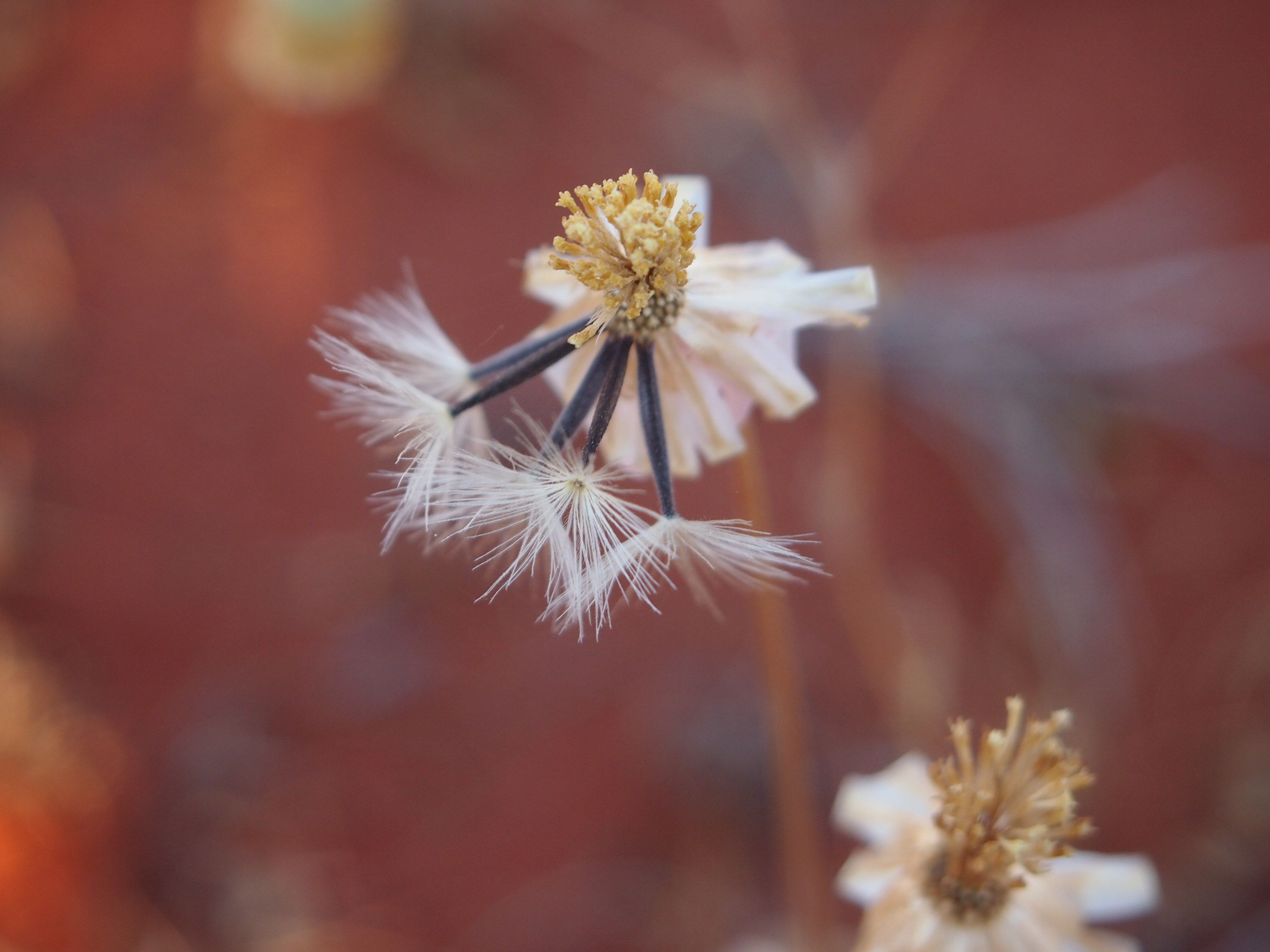

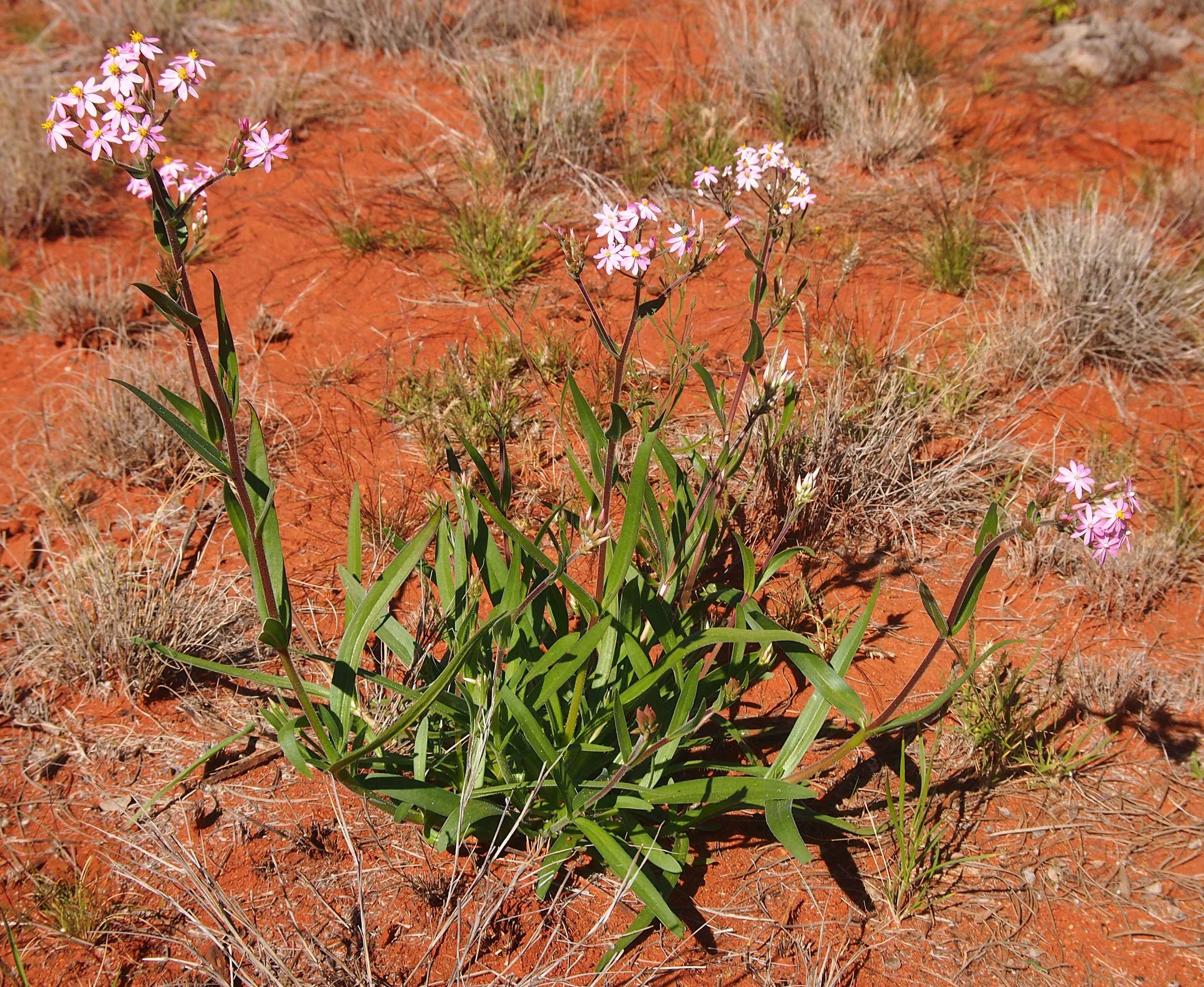
