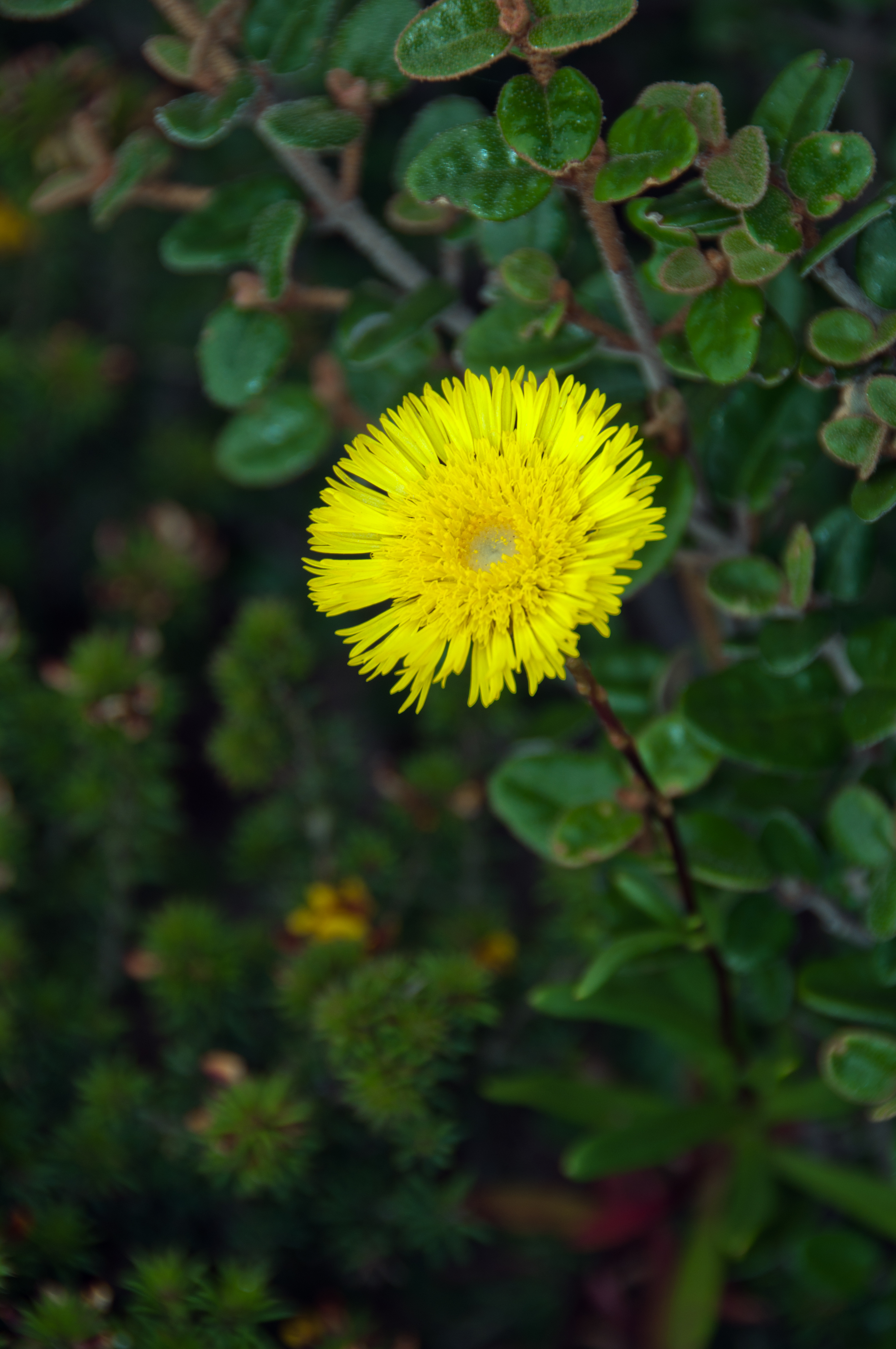
- Podolepis jaceoides

Scientific classification
- Kingdom: Plantae
- Clade: Tracheophytes
- Clade: Angiosperms
- Clade: Eudicots
- Clade: Asterids
- Order: Asterales
- Family: Asteraceae
- Subfamily: Asteroideae
- Tribe: Gnaphalieae
- Genus: Podolepis; Labill.

Type species
- Podolepis rugata Labill.

Synonyms
- Rutidochlamys Sond.; Scalia Sims; Scaliopsis Walp.; Stylolepis Lehm.

= Podolepis =

Genus of plants

Podolepis is a genus of flowering plants in the tribe Gnaphalieae within the family Asteraceae. It is endemic to Australia and can be found in every state.

== Species ==
The following species are assigned to this genus:

- Podolepis angustifolia Hort., 1894
- Podolepis arachnoidea (Hook.) Druce
- Podolepis aristata Benth.
- Podolepis canescens A.Cunn. ex DC.
- Podolepis contorta Lindl.
- Podolepis decipiens Jeanes
- Podolepis eremaea Jeanes
- Podolepis gardneri G.L.Davis
- Podolepis gracilis Graham
- Podolepis hieracioides F.Muell.
- Podolepis inundata A.Cunn., 1838
- Podolepis jaceoides (Sims) Voss
- Podolepis laciniata Frood
- Podolepis laevigata Gand.
- Podolepis linearifolia Jeanes
- Podolepis longipedata A.Cunn. ex DC.
- Podolepis lucaena (Walp.) Walp., 1847
- Podolepis monticola R.J.F.Hend.
- Podolepis neglecta G.L.Davis
- Podolepis nutans Steetz
- Podolepis omissa Jeanes
- Podolepis papillosa Brown ex Pépin
- Podolepis papillosa Gand.
- Podolepis papillosa Jacques
- Podolepis remota Jeanes
- Podolepis robusta (Maiden & Betche) J.H.Willis
- Podolepis rugata Labill.
