= Australian lime =

Lime cultivar

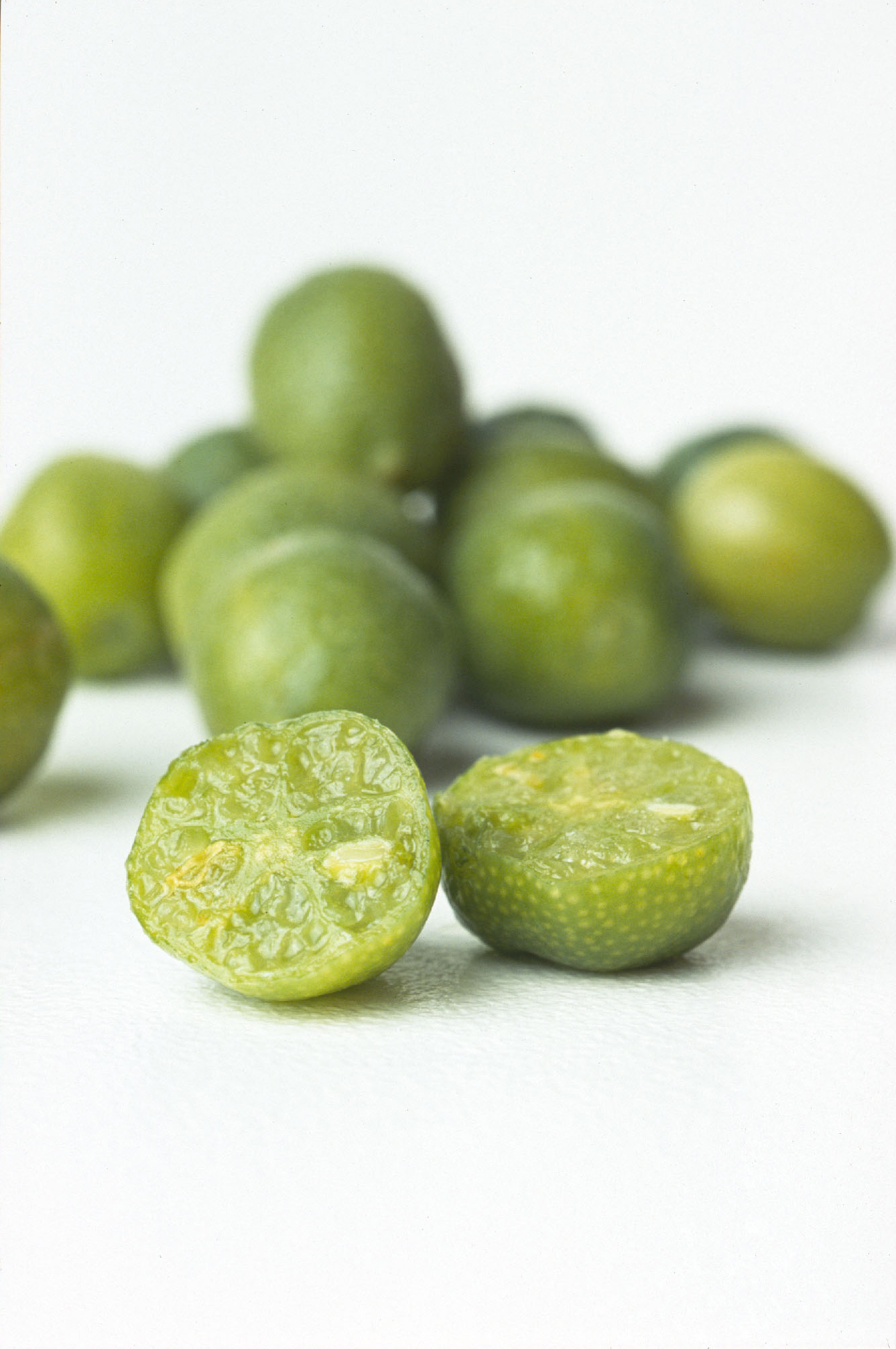
The Australian Outback Lime, a cultivar of the desert lime (C. glauca)

Australian limes are species of the plant genus Citrus that are native to Australia and Papua New Guinea.

These species were formerly included in the genera Microcitrus and Eremocitrus. They have been used as a food source by indigenous Australians and Indigenous New Guineans as well as early settlers and are used in modern Australian cuisine, including marmalade and sauces.

Species include:

- Australian limes
  - former Eremocitrus
    Citrus glauca
  - former Microcitrus
    - Citrus warburgiana
    - - - Citrus inodora
        - Citrus maideniana
      - - Citrus garrawayi
        - Citrus australasica
      - Citrus australis

== Species from Australia ==
=== Natural species ===
- Citrus australasica (Finger lime), a species from rainforest regions of northern New South Wales and Southern Queensland with elongated yellow-green to purple fruits.
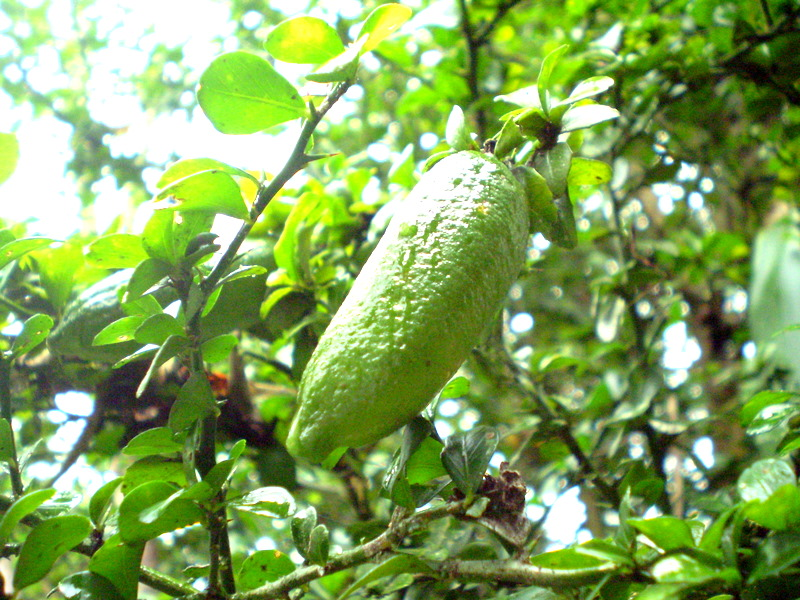
  Finger lime
- Citrus australis (Round lime or Dooja), a species from south-eastern Australia with round, green fruits
- Citrus glauca (Desert lime), from arid areas of inland Australia. Small round fruits are produced in summer.
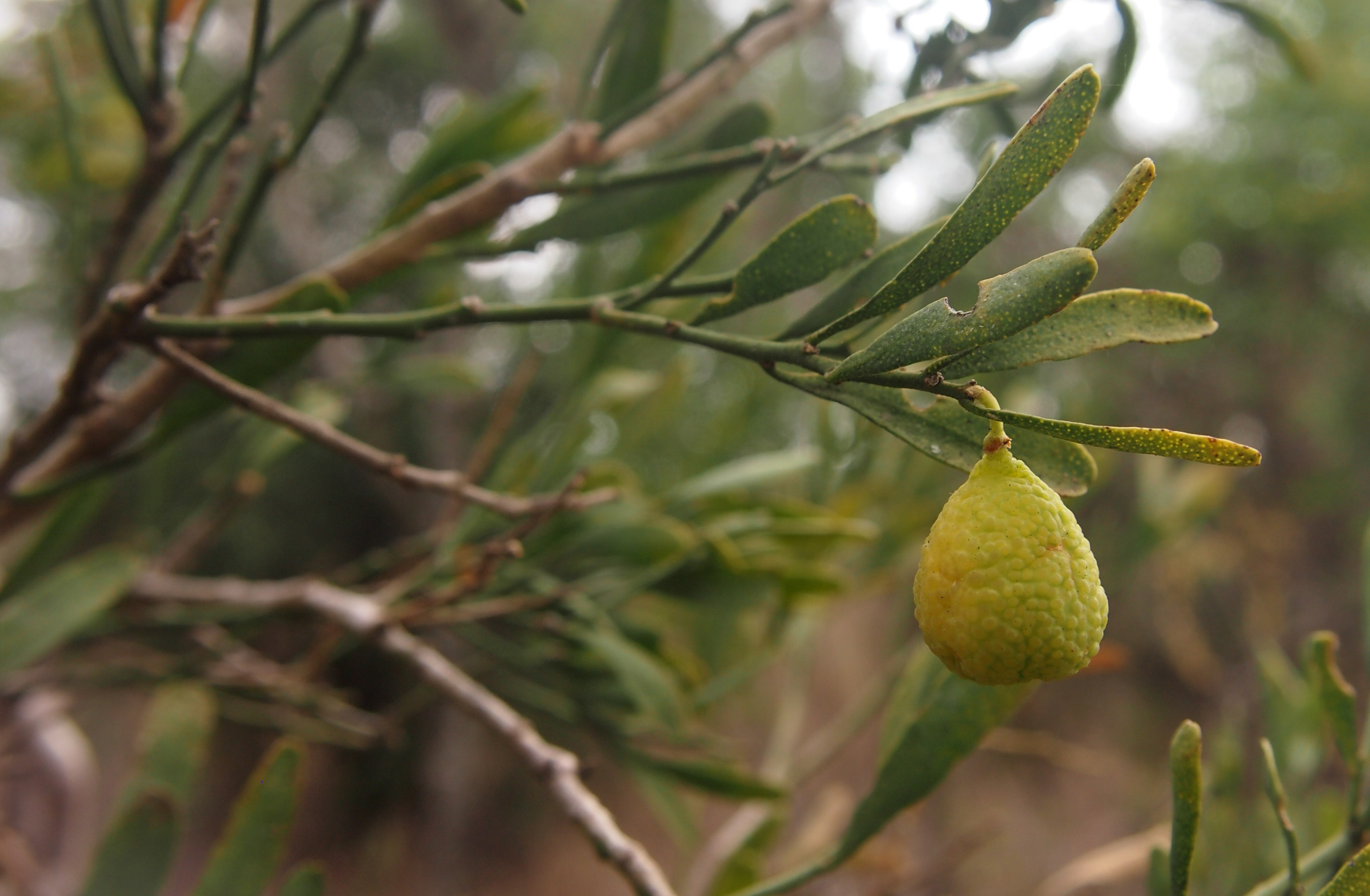
  Desert lime
- Citrus garrawayi, (Mount White lime) is rare and endemic to the Cook District of Cape York Peninsula.
- Citrus gracilis (Kakadu lime or Humpty Doo lime) grows in eucalypt woodland in the Northern Territory and was first described in the scientific literature in 1998.
- Citrus inodora (Russell River lime or large-leaf Australian wild lime) is rare, and endemic to northern Queensland.
- Citrus maideniana (Maiden's Australian wild lime) may be a subspecies of C. inodora.

=== Cultivars ===
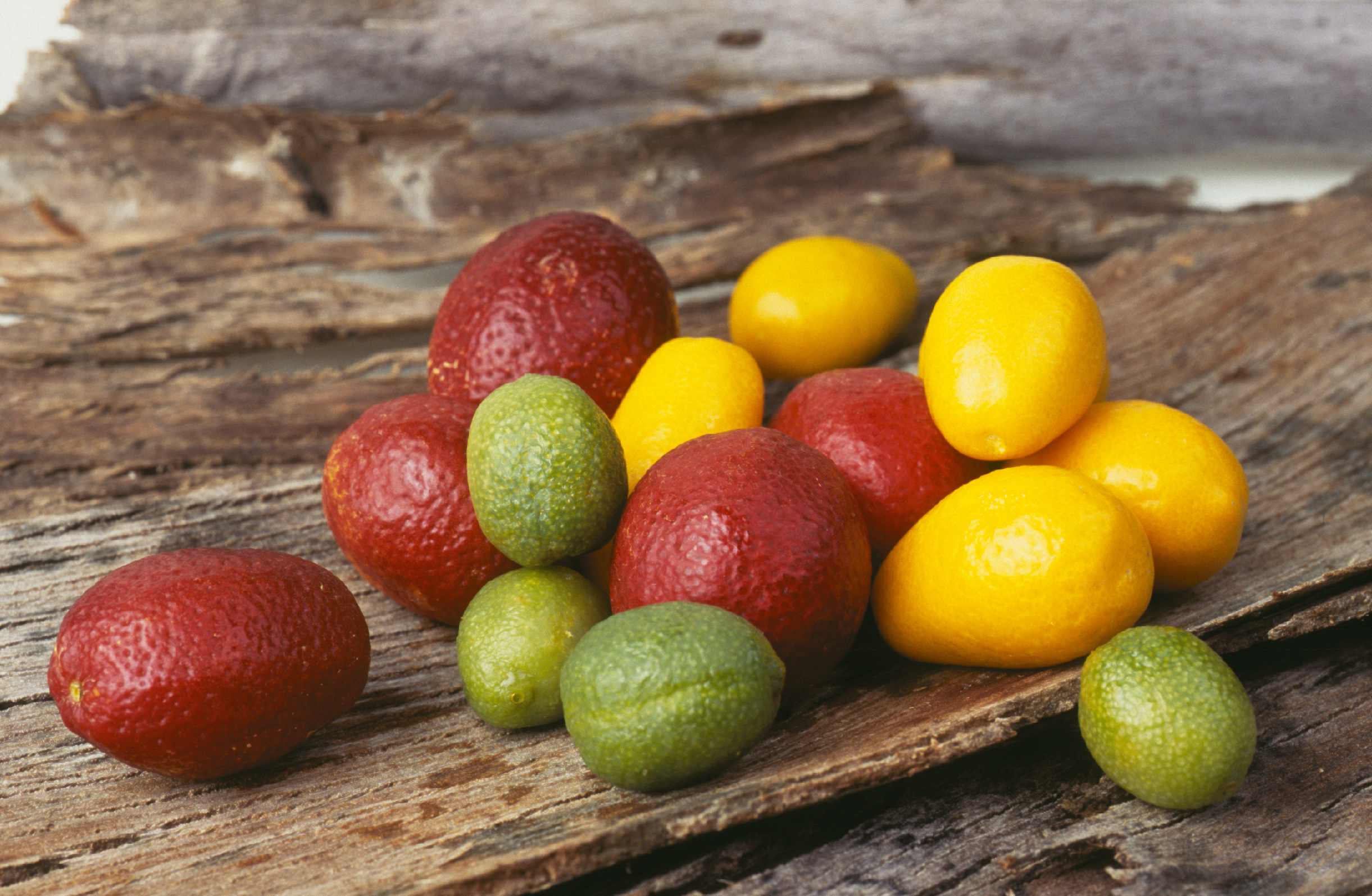
Blood Lime (biggest, red), Sunrise Lime (orange, pear-shaped) and the Outback Lime, a small, green cultivar of the desert lime

A number of cultivars have been developed in recent years. These can be grafted on to standard citrus rootstocks. They may be grown as ornamental trees in the garden or in containers. Grafted standards are available for some varieties. The cultivars include:

- 'Australian Outback' (or 'Australian Desert'), developed from several desert lime varieties
- 'Australian Blood', 'Australian Red Centre' or Blood Lime, a cross of finger lime and an acid-mandarin.
- 'Australian Sunrise', a hybrid cross of finger lime and a calomondin which is pear shaped and orange inside
- 'Rainforest Pearl', a pink-fruited form of finger lime from Bangalow, New South Wales
- 'Sunrise Lime' (Citrus × oliveri), a hybrid of finger lime and calamondin.
- 'Outback Lime', a desert lime cultivar

== Species from Papua New Guinea ==
- Citrus warburgiana (Kakamadu or New Guinea wild lime) grows on the south coast of the Papuan Peninsula near Alotau (pictures).
- Citrus wakonai (also locally called kakamadu) has been reported from Goodenough Island.
- Citrus wintersii, also known as Citrus papuana (Brown River finger lime) has, as the name suggests, a small, thin fruit, pointed at both ends (pictures, more pictures). It grows near Port Moresby.
- Clymenia sp. are native to the Bismarck Archipelago but are cultivated in other areas. Clymenia is now often considered to belong within the citrus genus.
  - Clymenia platypoda
  - Clymenia polyandra has a lemon-sized round fruit, pointed at one end (pictures).

Citrus species in Papua New Guinea have not been extensively studied, so the true number of species is unknown.

== Identification ==
An identification key exists for the known Australian limes (not including species from Papua New Guinea). The leaves of some species broaden dramatically with age.
