= Citrus papuana =

Citrus papuana may refer to:

- Citrus papuana F.M.Bailey a synonym of Citrus hystrix, the Kaffir lime
- Microcitrus papuana Winters, a synonym of Citrus wintersii, the Brown River finger lime
