= Lime (fruit) =

Citrus fruit

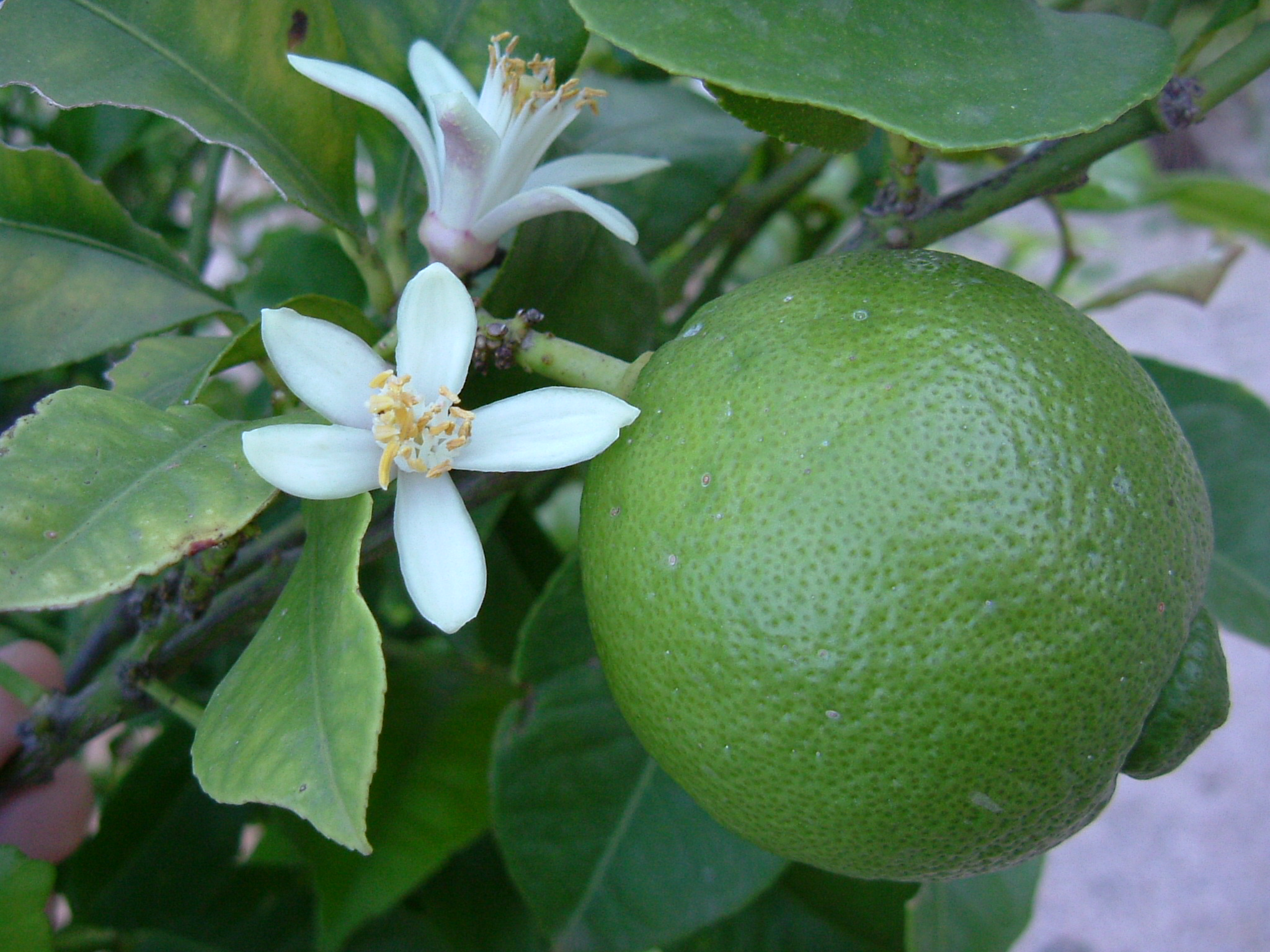
The fruit and flower of a Persian lime (Citrus × latifolia)

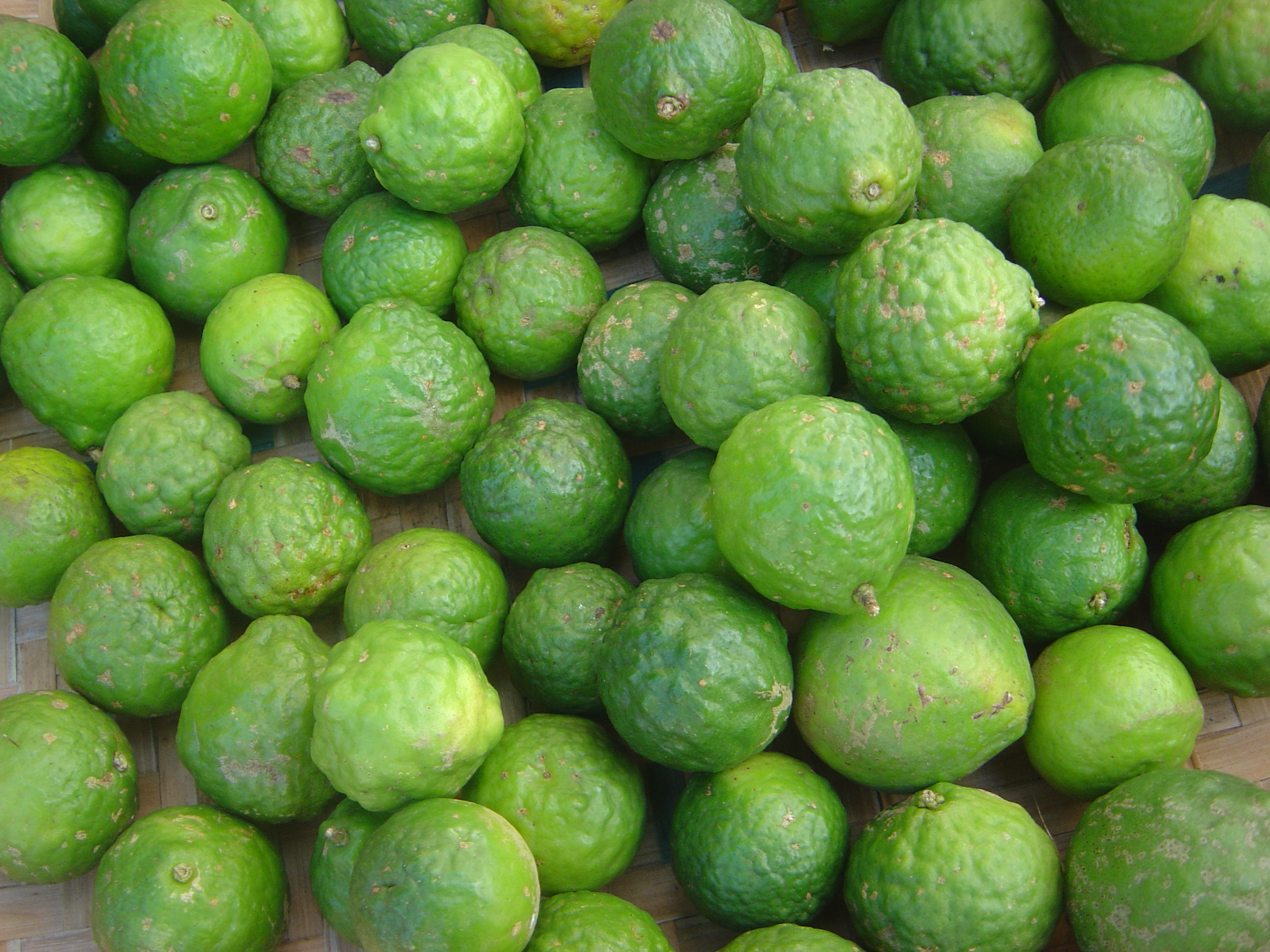
Kaffir lime fruit

A lime is the fruit of several species of citrus, most of which are hybrids within the genus Citrus (family Rutaceae). Limes are generally small, round to oval fruits with green flesh and skin and a distinct sour taste due to their high citric acid content. They are widely cultivated in tropical and subtropical regions for culinary, medicinal, and ornamental purposes.

The term "lime" is used for a variety of citrus fruits, including the key lime (Citrus × aurantiifolia), Persian lime (Citrus × latifolia), kaffir lime (Citrus hystrix), finger lime (Citrus australasica), blood lime (hybrid), and desert lime among others. Limes are a rich source of vitamin C and are used to accent the flavors of foods and beverages. In 2025, world production of limes (combined with lemons) was 10.06 million metric tons primarily led by Mexico, which exports it for widespread use in both Tex-Mex and Mexican cuisines; its artifical flavorant is used in lemon-lime soda brands of global renown, Sprite, Sierra Mist, Mountain Dew, and 7 Up being the most popular examples.

== Description ==
Limes are typically 3–6 cm (1–2.5 in) in diameter and have a thin to moderately thick rind that is green when unripe and may turn yellow when fully mature; its pulp is juicy and tart. Most commercial varieties are harvested green, when their flavor and acidity are strongest. Lime trees are small, evergreen shrubs or low trees with glossy leaves and fragrant white flowers. Fruit seediness varies: Key limes are generally seedy, while Persian limes are almost seedless.

== Taxonomy and species ==
Limes do not form a single botanical group, as most commercial varieties are hybrids derived from citron (C. medica), mandarin (C. reticulata), pomelo (C. maxima), and sometimes micrantha.

- Key lime (Citrus × aurantiifolia) — Small, seedy fruit, historically spread from Southeast Asia.
- Persian lime (Citrus × latifolia) — Larger, nearly seedless hybrid of Key lime and lemon (C. × limon), the most widely produced lime.
- Kaffir lime (C. hystrix) — Aromatic bumpy fruit, widely used in Southeast Asian cuisines. Also called Makrut lime.
- Australian desert lime (C. glauca) and finger lime (C. australasica) — Native Australian species with niche culinary use.
- Other hybrids include blood lime, Rangpur lime, and sweet lime (Citrus limetta).
- Noncitrus limes include Spanish lime (Melicoccus bijugatus), Zanthoxylum fagara, and Adelia ricinella.

The British name "lime tree" also applies to Tilia species, unrelated to citrus.

== History ==
Limes originated in tropical Southeast Asia particularly Indonesia and South China and were spread via human migration and trade. Kaffir lime was among the earliest citrus fruits introduced outside its native range. Limes reached Micronesia and Polynesia through the Austronesian expansion (c. 3000–1500 BCE), and later the Middle East and Mediterranean through the spice trade by at least 1200 BCE.

During the 19th century, British sailors consumed citrus, including limes, to prevent scurvy, giving rise to the nickname "limey". The practice was a closely guarded military secret.

Lime (and lemon) production 2025, millions of tons
Mexico	3.37
Argentina	1.91
European Union	1.34
United States	0.978
Turkey	2.3
World	10.06
Source: USDA

== Production ==
=== Mexico ===
Since at least the 1950s, Mexico has been the world's largest producer and exporter of limes, and especially of lime oil.

The two popular varieties of limes grown in Mexico are the Mexican or Key lime (Citrus aurantifolia) and the Persian lime (Citrus latifolia, simply called "lime" in the US); the former is of Indo–Malayan origin introduced in Mexico by the Spaniards, while the latter, also called the Tahiti lime, was introduced from the United States. Persian lime production in Mexico caters specifically to the US market; a substantial increase in production has been attributed to the North American Free Trade Agreement.

=== Lime oil ===
Lime oil is typically obtained by steam distillation, in contrast to most other citrus oils which are extracted by cold pressing. Two species are of particular economic value, Key lime and Persian lime. In 2025, world production of limes and lemons was 10.06 million tons led primarily led by Mexico (table).

== Uses ==
=== Culinary ===
Limes are valued for their tart juice and zest aroma. Lime juice is used in Tex-Mex and Mexican cuisines much, i.e. in cocktails (e.g., margarita, gimlet, daiquiri), ceviche, guacamole and limeade. Desert lime is used in Australian marmalade, while dried limes (limoo or black lime) are used in Persian cuisine, Iraqi cuisine, Eastern Arabian cuisine spice blends.

Key lime pie is specifically made from juice of its namesake local Key lime or similar substitutes such as Tahiti lime; it has been promoted as Florida's "most famous treat" and in 1987 as "the greatest of all regional American desserts."

Artifical lime flavorant is used in lemon-lime soda brands of global renown such as 7 Up, a brand owned by Keurig Dr Pepper in the US and PepsiCo in international regions, competes primarily with the Coca-Cola Company's Sprite and PepsiCo's Starry; it is the namesake ingredient used in 7 Up cake, which relies on its namesake drink for leavening purposes.

=== Nonculinary ===
Lime extracts and essential oils are used in perfume, cleaning products and aromatherapy.

== Nutrition and phytochemicals ==
Raw limes are 88% water, 10% carbohydrates, contain less than 1% fat and protein, and provide 35% of the Daily Value of vitamin C per 100 g serving. Lime juice contains about 47 grams per litre of citric acid, roughly twice that of grapefruit juice and five times that of orange juice.

Lime pulp and peel contain diverse phytochemicals, including polyphenols and terpenes.

== Toxicity ==
Contact with lime peel or juice followed by exposure to ultraviolet light can cause phytophotodermatitis ("margarita photodermatitis"). Furanocoumarins, including bergapten, limettin, psoralen, and xanthotoxin, are the primary phototoxic compounds. Lime peel contains higher concentrations than pulp, making it more phototoxic.

== See also ==
- Lime production in Mexico
- List of citrus fruits
- List of culinary fruits varieties
