= Blood lime =

Citrus fruit and plant

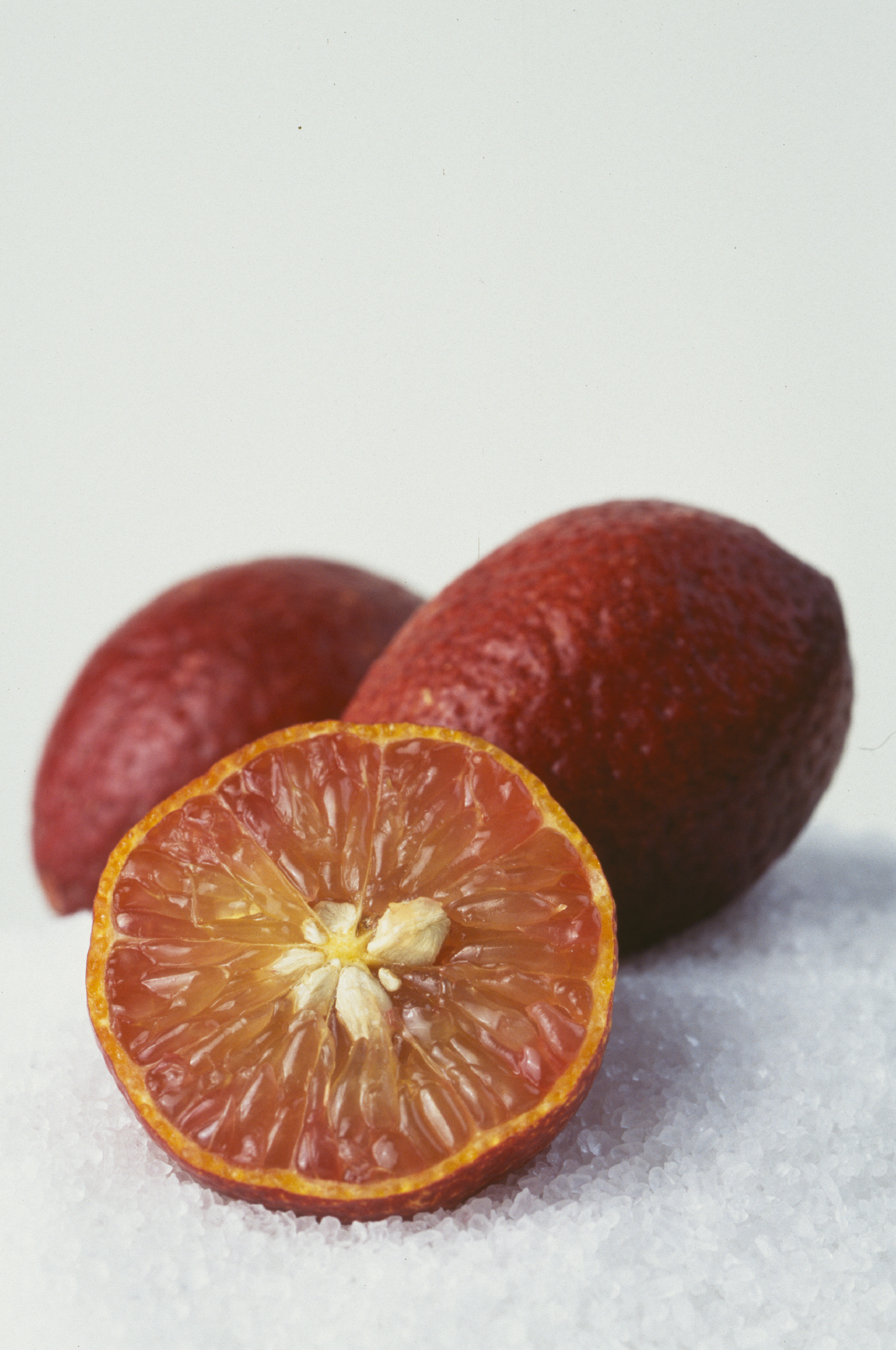
- Blood limes
- Hybrid parentage: Citrus australasica var. sanguinea x 'Ellendale Mandarin' hybrid
- Origin: Australia

Blood limes (or Australian Blood Limes) are a hybrid citrus fruit developed by the CSIRO project to investigate salt-resistant crops.

While the limes proved suitable for high-salt conditions, they have seen no commercial development; the first commercial crop appeared in markets in Australia in July 2004, and are under consideration for export.

The blood lime is smaller than most limes, approximately 4 cm (1.6 in) long by 2 cm (0.79 in) diameter, and somewhat sweeter than the standard. It is egg-shaped and fruits in the winter. The flesh inside a blood lime is composed of red-orange vesicles. The skin can be eaten with the fruit. It is usually red or burgundy, but can sometimes be green like the standard lime.

The blood lime is a cross between the red finger lime (Citrus australasica var. sanguinea) and the 'Ellendale Mandarin' hybrid. The Ellendale is a sweet orange/mandarin cross. The medium-sized trees, which have thorns, may be used as ornamental plants.

== See also ==
- Biosalinity
