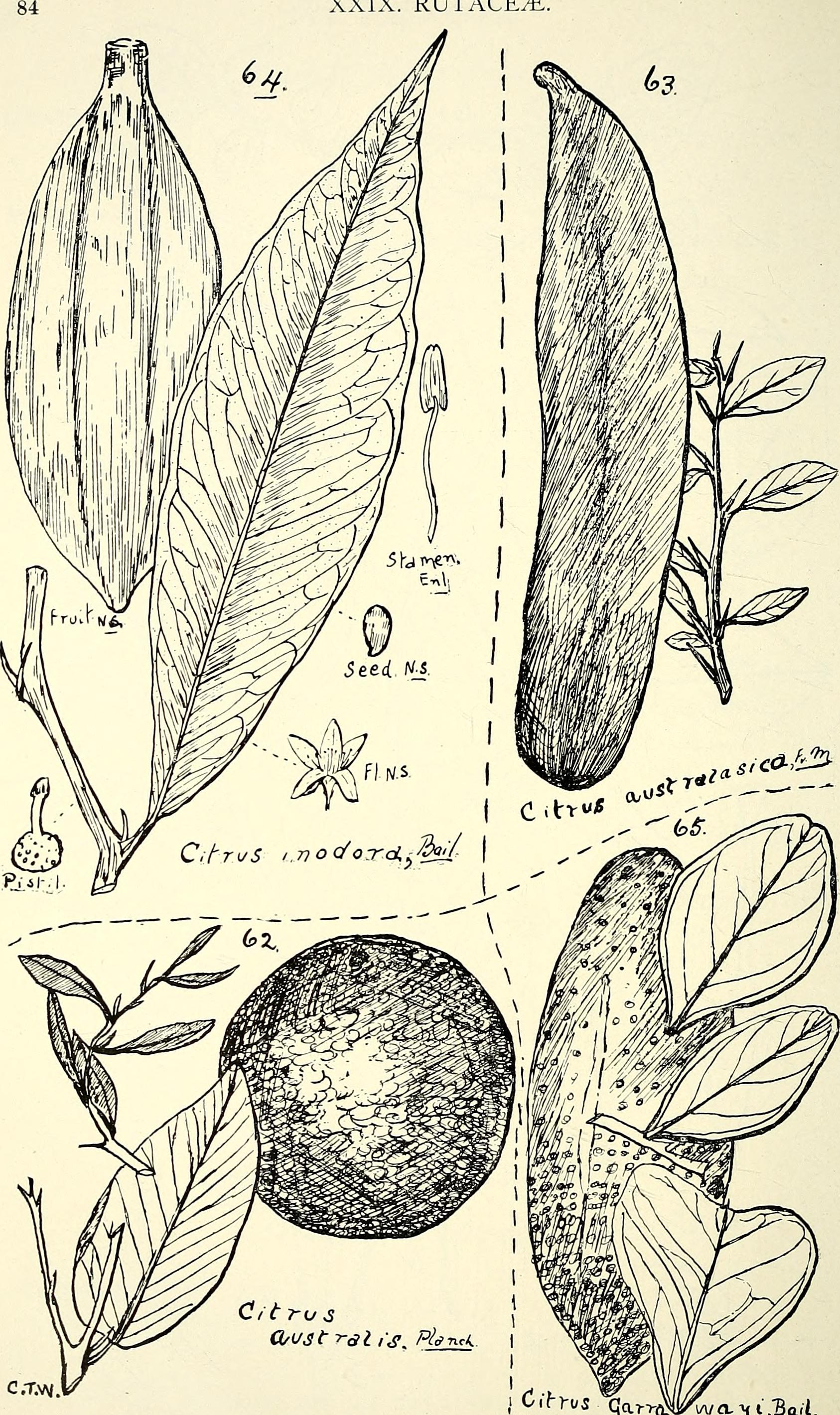
- 62. Citrus australis 63. Citrus australasiaca 64. Citrus inodora 65. Citrus garrawayi

Scientific classification
- Kingdom: Plantae
- Clade: Tracheophytes
- Clade: Angiosperms
- Clade: Eudicots
- Clade: Rosids
- Order: Sapindales
- Family: Rutaceae
- Genus: Citrus
- Species: C. garrawayi

Binomial name
- Citrus garrawayi F.M.Bailey

Synonyms
- Microcitrus garrawayae (F.M.Bailey) Swingle; Citrus garrawayae (F.M.Bailey)

= Citrus garrawayi =

Mount White lime

Species of tree

Citrus garrawayi, the Mount White lime, is a tree native to the Cape York region of northern Queensland in Australia. It is an understory tree in tropical rainforests.

Citrus garrawayi is a shrub or small tree up to 15 m (49 ft), with broad lanceolate leaves. Fruits are elongated, yellowish-green with green pulp. The fruits are edible but the species is rare and grows in an isolated location, so there has to date been no commercial use of it.

The species is often included in the genus Microcitrus rather than in the genus Citrus.

- Australian limes
  - former Eremocitrus
    Citrus glauca
  - former Microcitrus
    - Citrus warburgiana
    - - - Citrus inodora
        - Citrus maideniana
      - - Citrus garrawayi
        - Citrus australasica
      - Citrus australis

== See also ==
- Citrus taxonomy for Australian and New Guinean species
