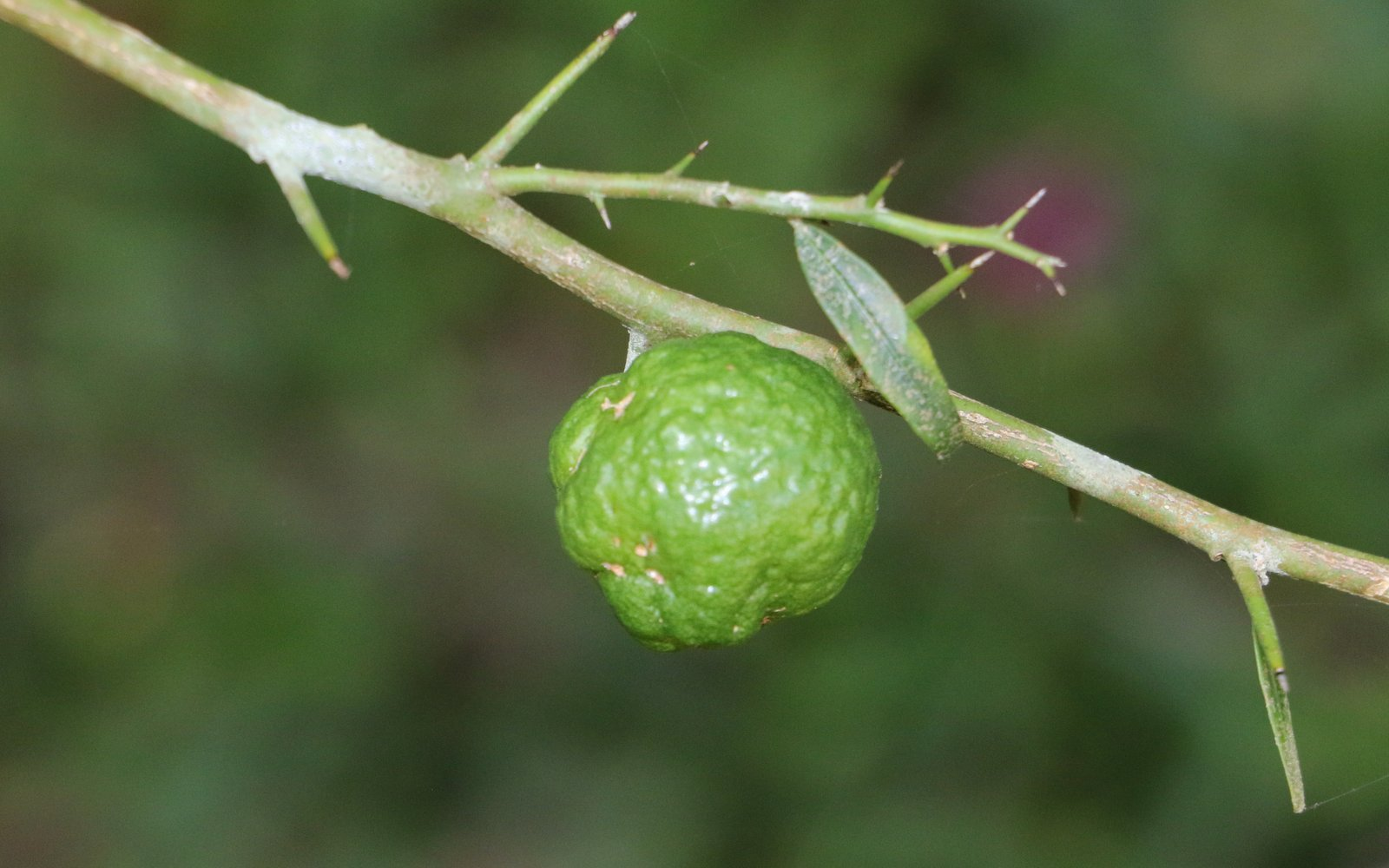

Scientific classification
- Kingdom: Plantae
- Clade: Embryophytes
- Clade: Tracheophytes
- Clade: Spermatophytes
- Clade: Angiosperms
- Clade: Eudicots
- Clade: Rosids
- Order: Sapindales
- Family: Rutaceae
- Genus: Citrus
- Species: C. australis

Binomial name
- Citrus australis Planch.

= Citrus australis =

Australian round lime

Species of shrub

Citrus australis, the dooja, round lime, Australian lime or Australian round lime, is a large shrub or small tree producing an edible fruit. It grows in forest margins in the Beenleigh area and northwards, in Queensland, Australia.

Citrus australis is a tree up to 20 m (66 ft) tall. Fruits are spherical or slightly pear-shaped, 25–50 mm (0.98–1.97 in) across, with a thick green or yellow skin and pale green pulp. The 1889 book The Useful Native Plants of Australia records that "The fruit, which is an inch and a-half in diameter and almost globular, yields an agreeable beverage from its acid juice."

- Australian limes
  - former Eremocitrus
    Citrus glauca
  - former Microcitrus
    - Citrus warburgiana
    - - - Citrus inodora
        - Citrus maideniana
      - - Citrus garrawayi
        - Citrus australasica
      - Citrus australis

== Taxonomy ==
A member of the Rutaceae family, Citrus australis is also known as the Australian round lime, Australia sweet, dooja, Gympie lime, native lime, native orange, or the round lime. It is one of the three main types of indigenous limes that can be found in Australia, along with the Australian finger lime (Citrus australasica) and the Australian desert lime (Citrus glauca). The citruses can hybridize with other citrus species and develop other characteristics, such as drought resistance, salinity tolerance, and disease resistance.

In its native habitat, Citrus australis can grow to about 20 m (66 ft) high. The twigs have angled thorns, and the stems are angled with long internodes. The leaves tend to be elliptic in shape and pointed at the tips, just like the plants themselves. Each of the leaves is usually no bigger than 3 cm × 2 cm (1.18 in × 0.79 in) to 4 cm × 3 cm (1.6 in × 1.2 in) big. The buds bloom to show white or pinkish-white flowers. The fruit has a thick rind and has a yellowish-white pulp. There is about a 1 cm (0.39 in) long, slender spine in the fruit. Only a few seeds can be seen, and multiple thick vesicles, usually six segments of 7 mm (0.28 in), line the outside. The vesicles are usually very firm, are paler in shade, fusiform, and more often than not angular with blunt tips. Many of the Citrus australis found in nature may have twisted vesicles, caused by the pressure of the compression of juice vesicles inside of the fruit. In total, it make take about three years for the plant to bear fruit.

The Citrus australis can be distinguished from other species by its pear-like shape of being slightly narrower at the top and wider at the bottom, compared to the spherical shape that is more commonly seen in limes. It is also about 2 to 5 cm (0.79 to 1.97 in) wide in diameter, making it easier to distinguish against common limes which tend to be bigger in size. They also differ from other common citrus fruits by the amount of yellow oil that they possess, which can be seen from inside the vesicles of these fruits. Compared to other citruses such as the finger lime, Citrus australasica, or other Australian species of citrus, the vesicles differ in shape. Near the central axis of the Citrus australis, larger vesicles can be seen, which secretes the oil. In nature, citruses that have higher oil yields have larger leaves compared to those that have lower oil yields. For example, the Citrus australis was found to have an oil yield of 0.3-0.5%, and the Citrus glauca was found to have a yield of 0.6%. These both have a leaf size of about than 3 to 4 x 2 long. Conversely, the Citrus inodora has an oil yield of 0.1%, the Citrus garrawayi has an oil yield of 0.1-0.2%, and both have smaller leaves.

Many of the citruses can also be distinguished from each other by the compositions of their essential oils. For example, the Citrus australis is the only species that has large amounts of a-pinene. It also lacks limonene, which is most prevalent in the Citrus australasica and also contains only a small amount of germacrene D, germacrene B and bicyclogermacrene, which accounts for about 50% of the oil found in Citrus inodara. A further breakdown of the oils inside the leaves of the Citrus australis shows that it is composed of "a-pinene (68–80%), as well as P-pinene (2-4%), myrcene (3-5%), limonene (2-3%), p-phellandrene (1-2%), linalool(l-2%), bicyclogermacrene (1-4%), globulol (1-3%) and viridiflorol (3-5%)".

== Agroecology ==
The Citrus australis can be found in southeast Queensland, especially from Brisbane northwards in the lowland sub-tropical rainforests. The lime's characteristics include growing slowly and needing protection, especially when the plant is still young. The thorns on the stems provide protection from wild animals. It is also preferable for the continued preservation of soil moisture to improve fertility of the species, and for health of the soil. This is also most required during dry seasons. Despite this, it is still considered to be a hardy plant, and will thrive during the winter, being moderately frost tolerant. The plant will be scattered most commonly by scavengers who eat the fruits and tear it apart.

The Citrus australis, contrary to its name, can also be found in the US, in California. While the Citrus australis can be take time to take root, it can be propagated similarly to other plants through leaf cuttings, usually by getting a clean stem cut after around the fourth node. The propagated plant can be slow to develop roots, and can also be budded onto Citrus rootstock. The lime can be propagated in order to bear more fruits.

== Uses ==
Its nutritive properties include: "energy 91 g, moisture 74.8 g, protein 2.2g, nitrogen 0.35 g, ash 0.8 g, dietary fibre 6.7 g, carbohydrates 15.5 g, Ca 46 mg, Cu 0.2 mg, Fe 0.5 mg, Mg 24 mg, K 270 mg, Na 4 mg, Zn 0.1 mg, niacin 0.37 mg". Due to this, it is still used in cooking today in Australia. The fruit can be eaten raw, and is acidic in nature. However, it is more commonly used in cooking for making marmalades or as lime flavouring. The peels can also be cut to make an accent for pastas, or can be ground for a subtle integration into the sauce. It can also go well with seafood. The flowering season is restricted to spring, and fruits are ripe from November to March when the skin turns greenish-yellow.

The Citrus australis is most commonly compared to the Citrus australasica, which can be found in Southeast Queensland and northeast New South Wales. It is grown in similar conditions and can also be used for juices or jams. While the Citrus australasia is more prized for being good in preserves, Citrus australis is more suitable for flavoring. Another most commonly compared citrus is the Tahitian lime, or also known as the Persian lime. Although the Tahitian lime is also used to make marmalades and juices, its skin is rough, and therefore the entire lime may not be commonly used. However, while the Citrus australis has a dryer flesh than the Tahitian lime, it can be cut in half or used as a whole to flavor many dishes.

The other use for the Citrus australis comes by way of oils that they secrete in the vesicles. Although not as common as its culinary use, the oils from the Citrus australis can be used as an essential oil, as it has a distinctive and fragrant scent. Another use for its oils would be for a cleaner spray. Many oil cleaner sprays contains the chemical limonite, which are most commonly made using limes.

While not necessarily the most primary use, the Citrus australis can also be used for creating hybrids. As it is one of the most commonly seen vigorous native Australian species, they are not resistant to viroid infection. This makes them an ideal target for trying to trace the history of the Citrus australis. An example of this is the Sydney hybrid. The Sydney hybrid is a result of a hybrid between the Citrus australis and the Citrus australasica, and is found primarily in Australia. Other names for the Sydney hybrid include Microcitrus x virgate H. Hume or Citrus x virgate Mabb. The appearance of the lime when compared to its parents most commonly resembles the Citrus australasica with the size of the leaves and the shape of the fruit. The Sydney hybrid is elongated, about 3 cm × 5 cm (1.2 in × 2.0 in) with a rounded apex, compared to the Citrus australis which is more circular in shape. It is also known to be very drought-resistant.

While the tree for the Citrus australis found in nature can get to about 20 m (66 ft) high, it can also be grown in a garden as a small shrub or tree, which will typically stay at about 3 to 6 m (9.8 to 19.7 ft) high. Although the plant when young will have many thorns to protect it when vulnerable, as it grows it will becomes less prickly, making the plant easier to maintain. As the plant is grown on volcanic soils, the wood of the Citrus australis is close-grained and suitable for cabinet making and engravings.

== History ==
The Citrus australis is a Microcitrus, which is a cluster that contains the Citrus australis as well as other limes such as the New Guinea lime or the New Guinea wild lime. Through DNA replication and phylogenetic relationships, it is believed that the Citrus australis has evolved over millions of years, from a primitive ancestral type that underwent speciation in Australia and New Guinea.

There are two phases of speciation, where the first phase comes from the late Miocene of East and Southeast Asia. These include the Citrus medica (citrons), Citrus maxima, Citrus reticulata, Citrus hystrix, Citrus ichangensis, Citrus japonica, and Citrus mangshanensis. The second phase of speciation is from the early Pliocene of Oceania and include three Australian species of Citrus glauca, Citrus australasica, and Citrus australis.
