= Citrus gracilis =

Scientific classification
- Kingdom: Plantae
- Clade: Tracheophytes
- Clade: Angiosperms
- Clade: Eudicots
- Clade: Rosids
- Order: Sapindales
- Family: Rutaceae
- Genus: Citrus
- Species: C. gracilis

Binomial name
- Citrus gracilis Mabb.

Species of shrub

Citrus gracilis, the Humpty Doo lime or Kakadu lime, is a straggly shrub endemic to eucalypt savannah woodlands of Northern Territory, Australia.

Citrus gracilis is similar to the New Guinea species Citrus wintersii but with much larger fruits. The leaves are small and slender, and the bark is corky. The fruit is globose, lumpy and up to 10 cm (3.9 in) in diameter.
