= Citrus warburgiana =

Scientific classification
- Kingdom: Plantae
- Clade: Tracheophytes
- Clade: Angiosperms
- Clade: Eudicots
- Clade: Rosids
- Order: Sapindales
- Family: Rutaceae
- Genus: Citrus
- Species: C. warburgiana

Binomial name
- Citrus warburgiana F.M. Bailey

Synonyms
- Microcitrus warburgiana (F.M. Bailey) Tanaka

Species of citrus tree

Citrus warburgiana, the kakamadu or New Guinea wild lime, grows on the south coast of the Papuan Peninsula near Alotau in Papua-New Guinea.

It is a poorly known tree species. It has dark green, spherical fruits about 30 millimetres (1.2 in) in diameter. It is taxonomically an Australian lime:

- Australian limes
  - former Eremocitrus
    Citrus glauca
  - former Microcitrus
    - Citrus warburgiana
    - - - Citrus inodora
        - Citrus maideniana
      - - Citrus garrawayi
        - Citrus australasica
      - Citrus australis

This wild lime is a species of Microcitrus according to the Swingle system, called Microcitrus warburgiana, and according to the classification of David Mabberley, it is to be called Citrus warburgiana. It is the only Microcitrus coming from outside Australia. Being native to New Guinea, the closest Microcitrus to it is 1,600 kilometres (1,000 mi) away, namely Citrus garrawayi.

== See also ==
- Citrus taxonomy
