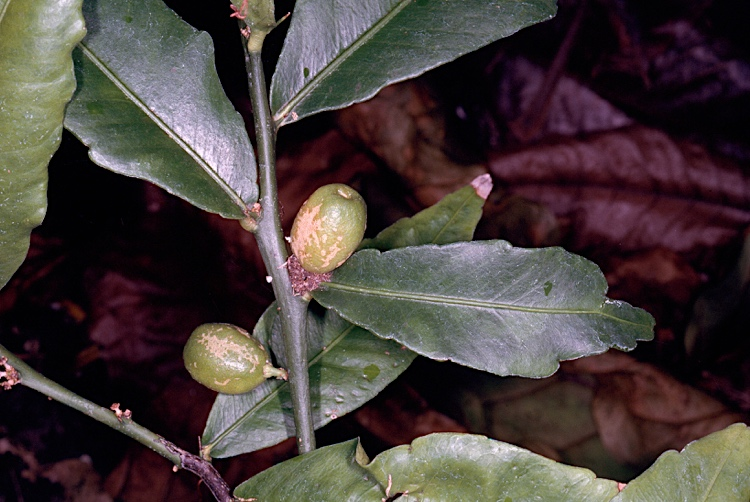
- Specimen with fruit photographed at Adelaide Botanic Gardens in South Australia

Conservation status
- Endangered (NCA)

Scientific classification
- Kingdom: Plantae
- Clade: Tracheophytes
- Clade: Angiosperms
- Clade: Eudicots
- Clade: Rosids
- Order: Sapindales
- Family: Rutaceae
- Genus: Citrus
- Species: C. inodora

Binomial name
- Citrus inodora F.M. Bailey

Synonyms
- Citrus maideniana Domin; Microcitrus inodora (F.M.Bailey) Swingle; Microcitrus maideniana (Domin) Swingle; Pleurocitrus inodora (F.M.Bailey) Tanaka

= Citrus inodora =

Species of tree

Citrus inodora or Microcitrus inodora, commonly known as Russell River lime or large leaf Australian wild lime, is a tree native to the Bellenden-Ker Range in northern Queensland, Australia.

Citrus inodora is a shrub up to 4 m (13 ft) tall. The fruit is egg-shaped and yellowish-green. Leaves and flowers are essentially odourless, lacking the aromatic oils characteristic of the genus.

== Phenology ==
Flowering occurs from August to November with fruiting observed in January, March and June.

== Distribution and Habitat ==
Citrus inodora is only known to occur in lowland tropical rainforest and in Backhousia bancroftii forest as an understorey plant at elevations from sea level to 120m on the eastern side of Bellenden Ker Range to Mount Bartle Frere area, and at Cape Tribulation.

Much of its native range has now been cleared for agricultural use including banana and sugar cane plantations.

== Varieties ==
Citrus maideniana, also known as Microcitrus maideniana, Citrus inodora var. maideniana, and Maiden's Australian lime, is sometimes considered a variety or subspecies of Citrus inodora. The two have similar distributions and the deeply depressed apex of the fruit of Citrus maideniana is the only difference between it and Citrus inodora. It is sometimes considered a synonym of Citrus inodora.

- Australian limes
  - former Eremocitrus
    Citrus glauca
  - former Microcitrus
    - Citrus warburgiana
    - - - Citrus inodora
        - Citrus maideniana
      - - Citrus garrawayi
        - Citrus australasica
      - Citrus australis

== Conservation status ==
Citrus inodora is listed as "endangered" under the Queensland Nature Conservation Act 1992. It is not listed under the Australian Environment Protection and Biodiversity Conservation Act 1999

== Uses ==
There has to date been no commercial use of the fruits.
