= Juice vesicles =

Component of citrus pulp

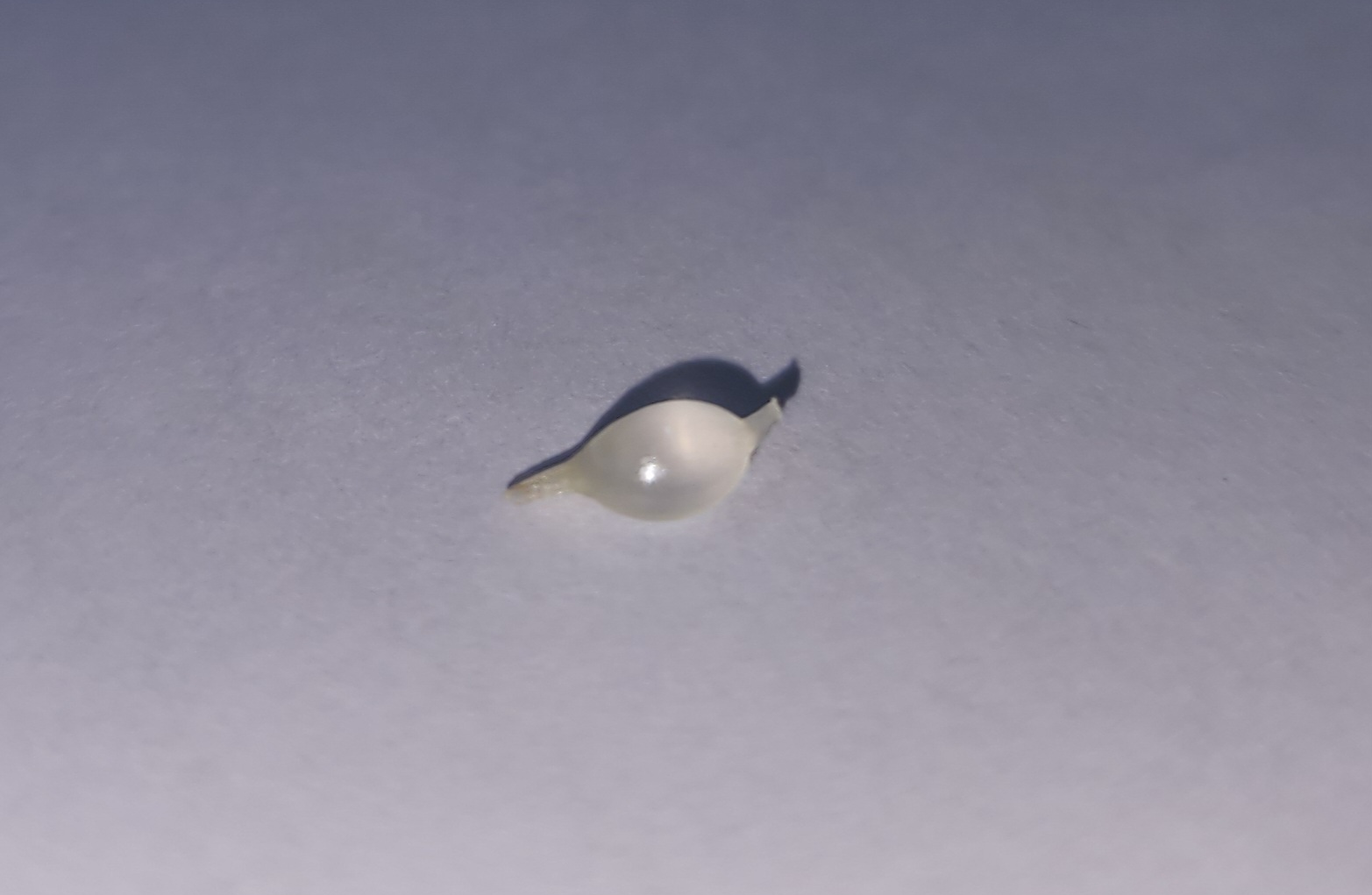
A single juice vesicle of a lime.

The juice vesicles of a citrus fruit, also known as citrus kernels (in aggregate, citrus pulp), are the membranous content of the fruit's endocarp. The vesicles contain the juice of the fruit and appear shiny and saclike. Vesicles come in two shapes: the superior and inferior, and these are distinct. Citrus fruits with more vesicles generally weigh more than those with fewer vesicles. Fruits with many segments, such as the grapefruit or pomelo, have more vesicles per segment than fruits with fewer segments, such as the kumquat and mandarin. Each vesicle in a segment in citrus fruits has approximately the same shape, size, and weight. About 5% of the weight of an average orange is made up of the membranes of the juice vesicles.

Juice vesicles of the endocarp contain the components that provide the aroma typically associated with citrus fruit. These components are also found in the flavedo oil sacs. The vesicles and their inner juices contain many vitamins and minerals as well as the taste and sweet acid fragrance.

Pulp cells often have thin membranes, and they are less regular in shape than other plant cells. They are also very large and protect the seeds of the fruit. The color of the pulp is variable, depending on the species and the ripening stage. Usually, it has the color of the outer peel (exocarp).

== Extraction and preservation ==
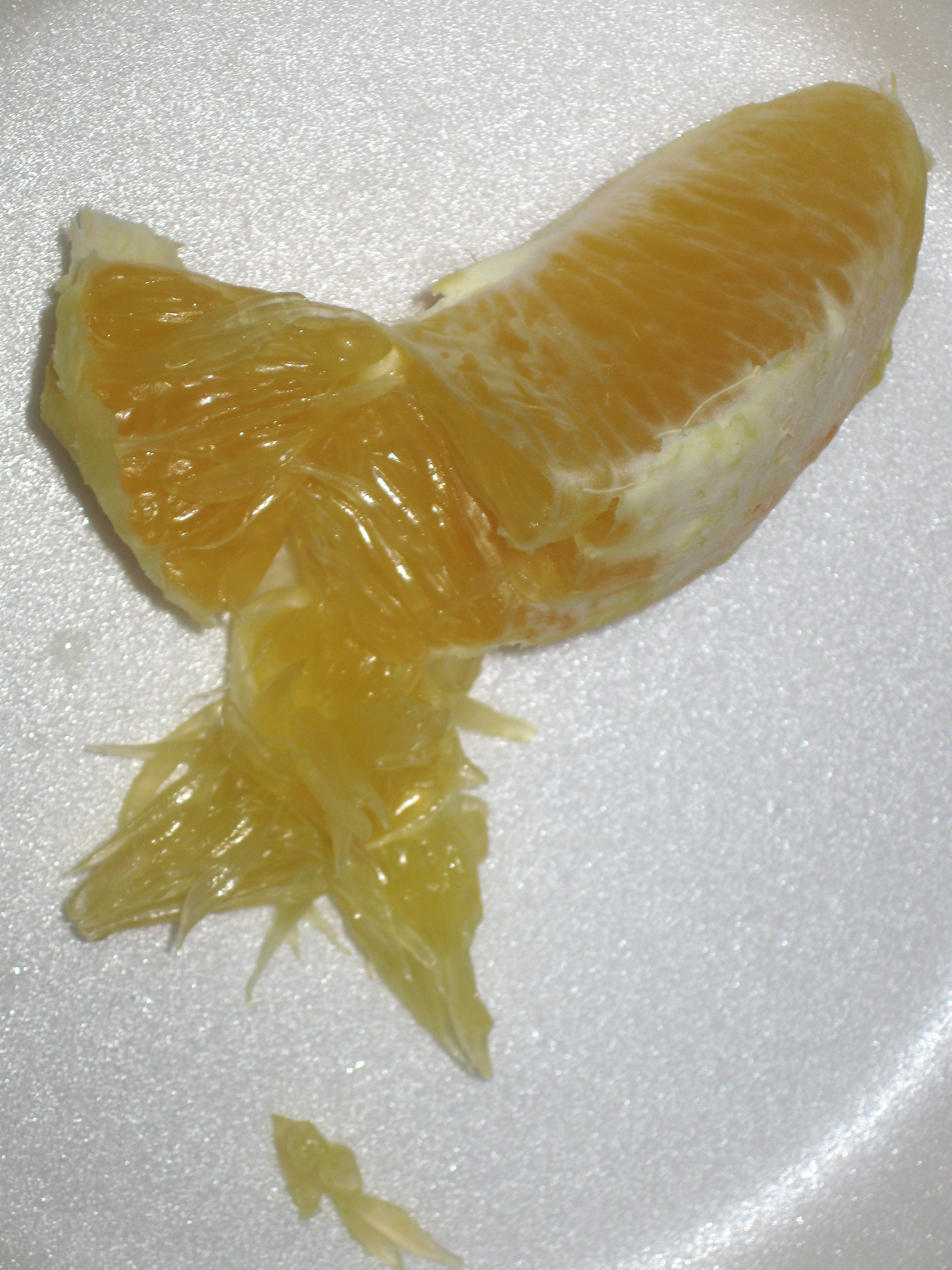
A segment of an orange that has been opened to show its pulp.

The juice held within juice vesicles can be recovered through various extraction processes. The pulp is usually removed from the juice by filtering it out. The juiciness of the pulp depends on the species, variety, season, and the tree on which it grew. Close to 90% of the citrus fruit juice solids are recovered with extractors. Pectic enzymes can sometimes be added to lessen the thickness of these solids. The juice along with these solids can be combined to increase primary juice yields or sold as bases for fruit beverages. The juice solids become opaque from the pulp washing process, resulting in a less expensive source of fruit solids for food labeling in comparison to regular juice. The juice solids can also be pasteurized, dried, and sold, but appear dark brown in color if they have not been washed properly before drying. The solids can also be stored frozen or sold to beverage manufacturers. They provide fruit beverages that are sold with a higher appeal to a consumer and improved texture in the juice. These opaque juice solids are known as cloud.

Drum drying or freezing are two processes for preserving juice solids. When product enzymes are deactivated through heat stabilization, they are frozen. Light and air are used for drum-drying, but this process often decreases the flavor and color of the solids.

== Use ==
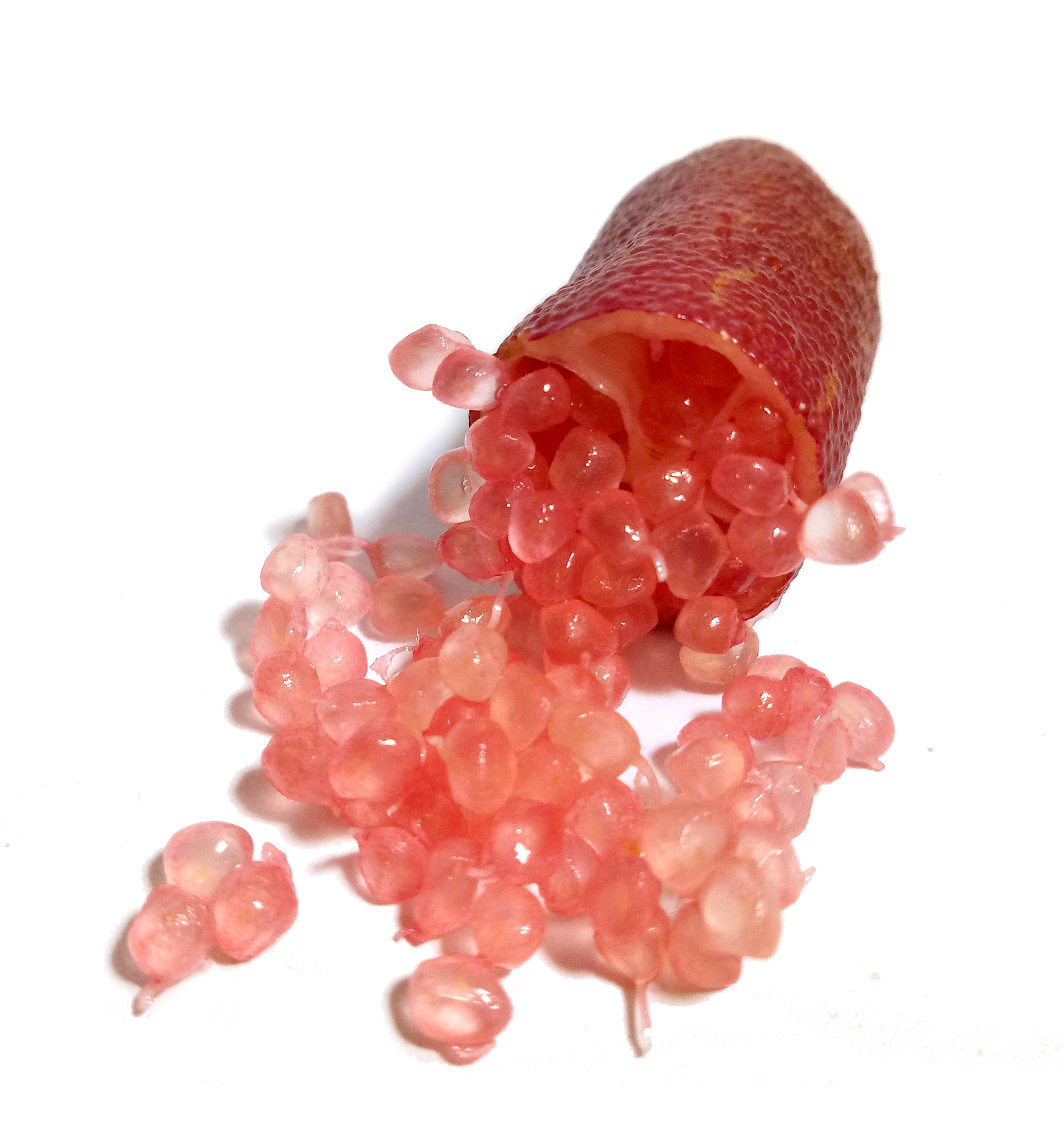
Juice vesicles of a finger lime.

One of the main uses for juice vesicles is for added substance to animal feed. Residue from juice vesicle extraction, once dried, can be added to cattle feed. Cattle feed often contains citrus pulp. This pulp helps in the long term to preserve nutrition, improve color, and create a more pleasant odor to the feed. Adding juice pulp provides cattle with a richer source of vitamins and minerals in addition to a more palatable taste. The green fodder used for cattle can be supplemented with this feed containing juice vesicles.

The other common use for juice vesicles is for enhancing beverages or creating inexpensive beverage bases. Jams and jellies, pulp in juice-based drinks, whole juices, and yogurt products contain extracted juice vesicle residue that was also dried. Some juices, juice concentrates, and drinks containing juice also contain previously frozen juice vesicles. The cloud resulting from the vesicles have sugar solids containing vitamin C. This cloud from vesicles is a popular alternative to brominated vegetable oil or glycerol ester of wood rosin, which are other clouding agents. The citrus in the vesicles is more often used for cloud especially for shipping products overseas.

In Japan, many yogurts and beverages include added enlarged citrus juice vesicles. These vesicles combined with enzymes are removed from fruit. This results from the heat of the enzymes. When eaten, teeth break the vesicles and provide a fresh squirt of citrus juice to the beverage or yogurt which can create a pleasurable drinking or eating experience.
