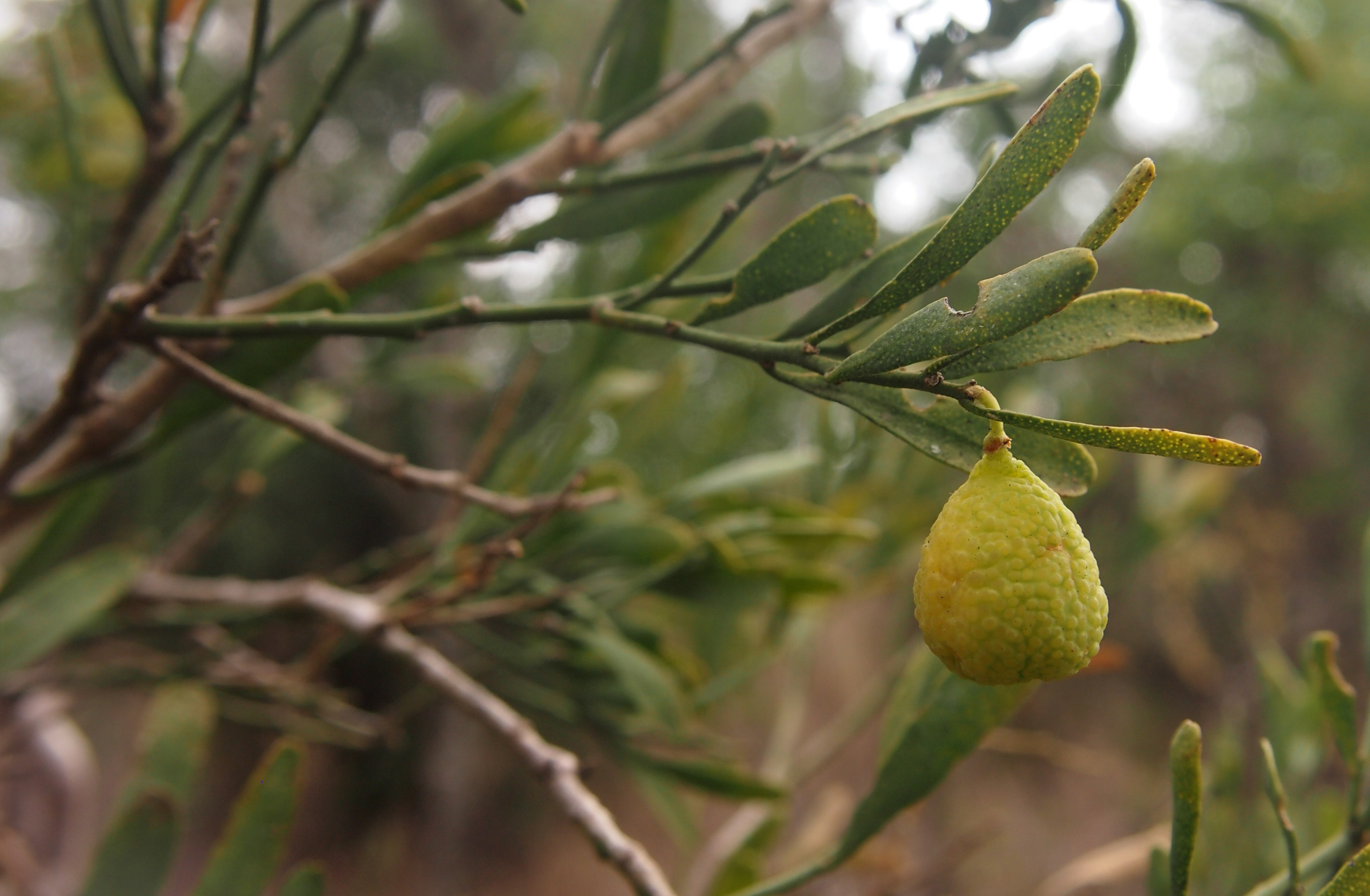

Scientific classification
- Kingdom: Plantae
- Clade: Tracheophytes
- Clade: Angiosperms
- Clade: Eudicots
- Clade: Rosids
- Order: Sapindales
- Family: Rutaceae
- Genus: Citrus
- Species: C. glauca

Binomial name
- Citrus glauca (Lindl.) Burkill

Synonyms
- Atalantia glauca (Lindl.) Benth. & Hook.f.; Atalantia glauca var. inermis F.M.Bailey; Eremocitrus glauca (Lindl.) Swingle; Triphasia glauca Lindl.

= Citrus glauca =

Species of plant

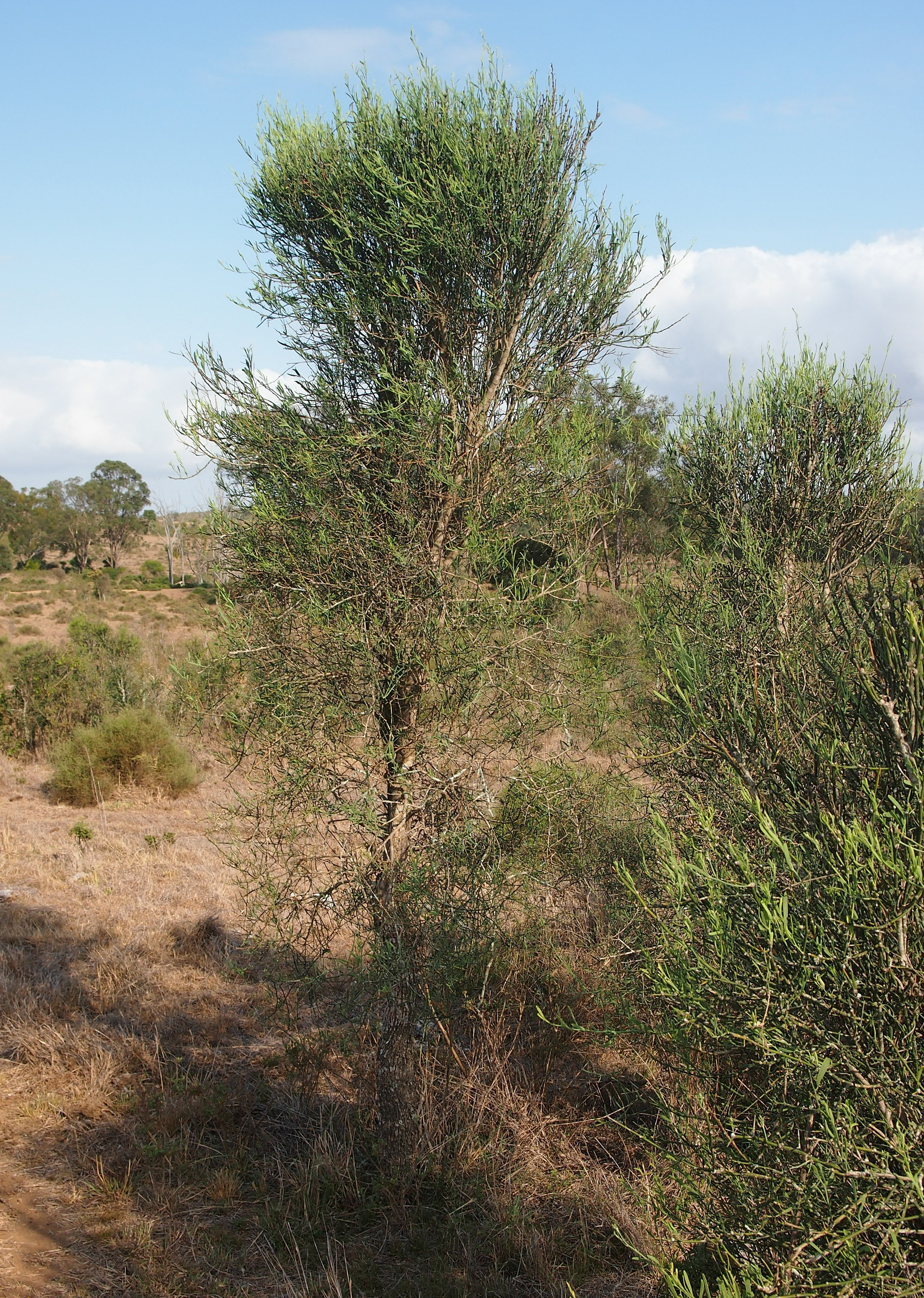
Citrus glauca in the wild

Citrus glauca, commonly known as the desert lime, is a thorny shrub or small tree native to Queensland, New South Wales, and South Australia. The 1889 book The Useful Native Plants of Australia records the common names native kumquat and desert lemon.

== Taxonomy ==
Under the Swingle system, the desert lime was classified in the genus Eremocitrus, a close relative of the genus Citrus. More recent taxonomy considers all the Australian limes to be included in the genus Citrus, and most authorities treat the desert lime this way. Citrus glauca is one of the most resilient Citrus species, and is comparatively heat, drought, and cold tolerant. Hence the species is potentially important for Citrus breeding programs, and readily hybridises with many common Citrus species.

- Australian limes
  - former Eremocitrus
    Citrus glauca
  - former Microcitrus
    - Citrus warburgiana
    - - - Citrus inodora
        - Citrus maideniana
      - - Citrus garrawayi
        - Citrus australasica
      - Citrus australis

== Description ==
A shrub or small tree to 12 metres (39 ft), it has several unusual characteristics. It is cold, heat, drought and salinity tolerant and considered to be evergreen. If the rains should fail, it will shed its leaves and survive by the green bark on its branches. It will set fruit almost immediately after flowering and is the earliest citrus to do so. Fruit is small and variable and depends on current climatic conditions and genetic make-up. Thorns appear on low-growing branches to prevent grazing by rabbits, kangaroos, cattle, etc., but cease on branches above the grazing level. The fruit is globular, and about half-an-inch in diameter. The limes have an intense piquant flavour, and years of good rainfall produce an abundance of fruit.

== Economic uses ==
The desert lime fruit is a highly prized bushfood. Traditionally, it is wild-harvested from surviving bushland areas, where it is relatively common. However, C. glauca has also been extensively cleared from some areas due to the ongoing conversion of the wild bush into agricultural fields. The fruit are used in a range of products, including marmalades, beverages, and succade. It has a strong lime-like flavour.

The fruit is beginning to be domesticated. Commercial cultivation of this fruit is beginning to reduce the reliance on wild-harvested product.

=== Cultivar ===
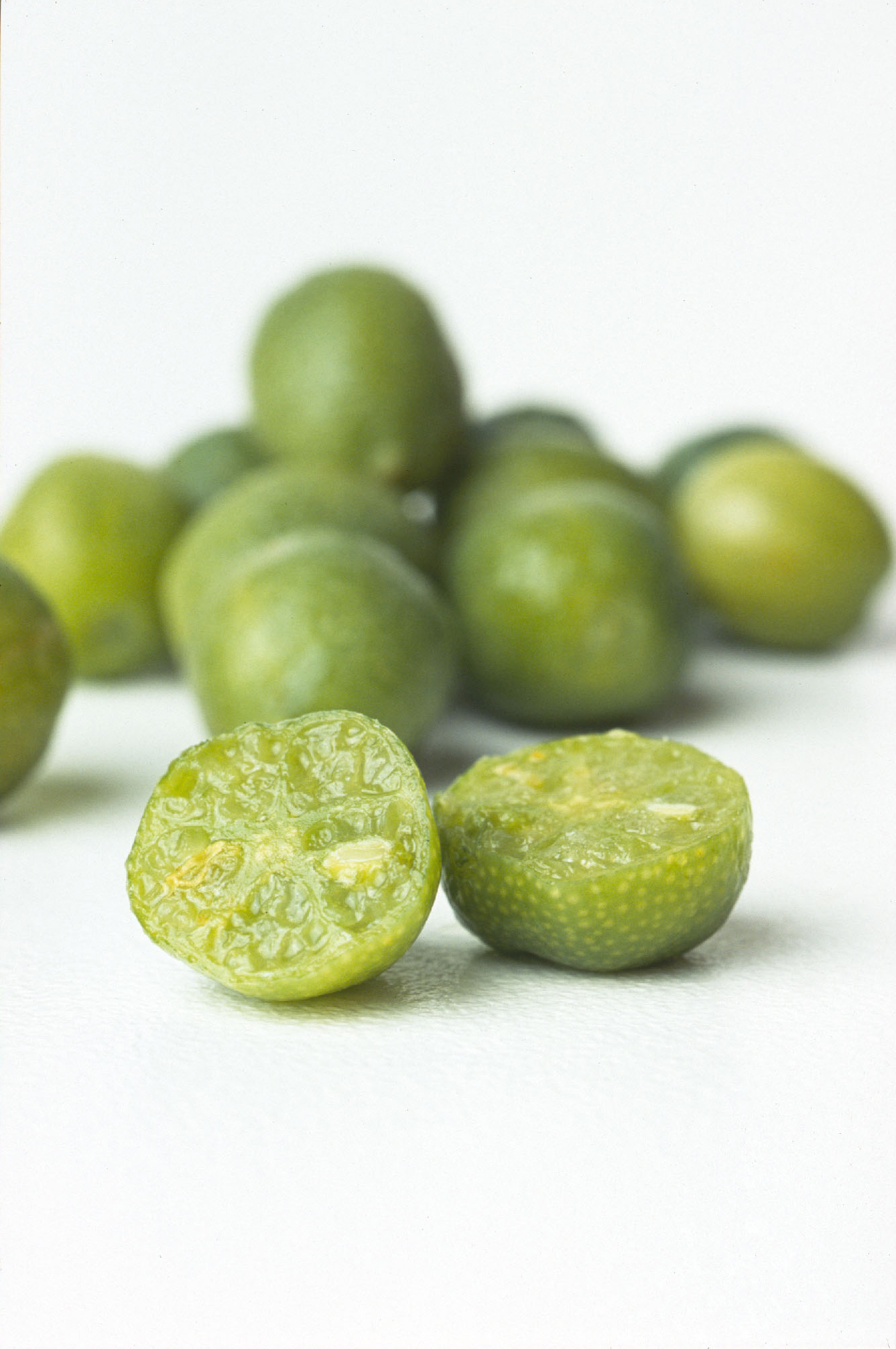
The Australian Outback lime, a selected cultivar

The Australian Outback lime was selected by CSIRO scientists from the regular desert lime. It is characterised by its upright habit, relatively large, flavoursome fruit, high yield, uniform ripening time, lack of thorns, and suitability for mechanical harvesting. The Australian Outback lime was cultivated at the former CSIRO Plant Industry site at Merbein, Victoria by Steve Sykes.

=== Hybrids ===
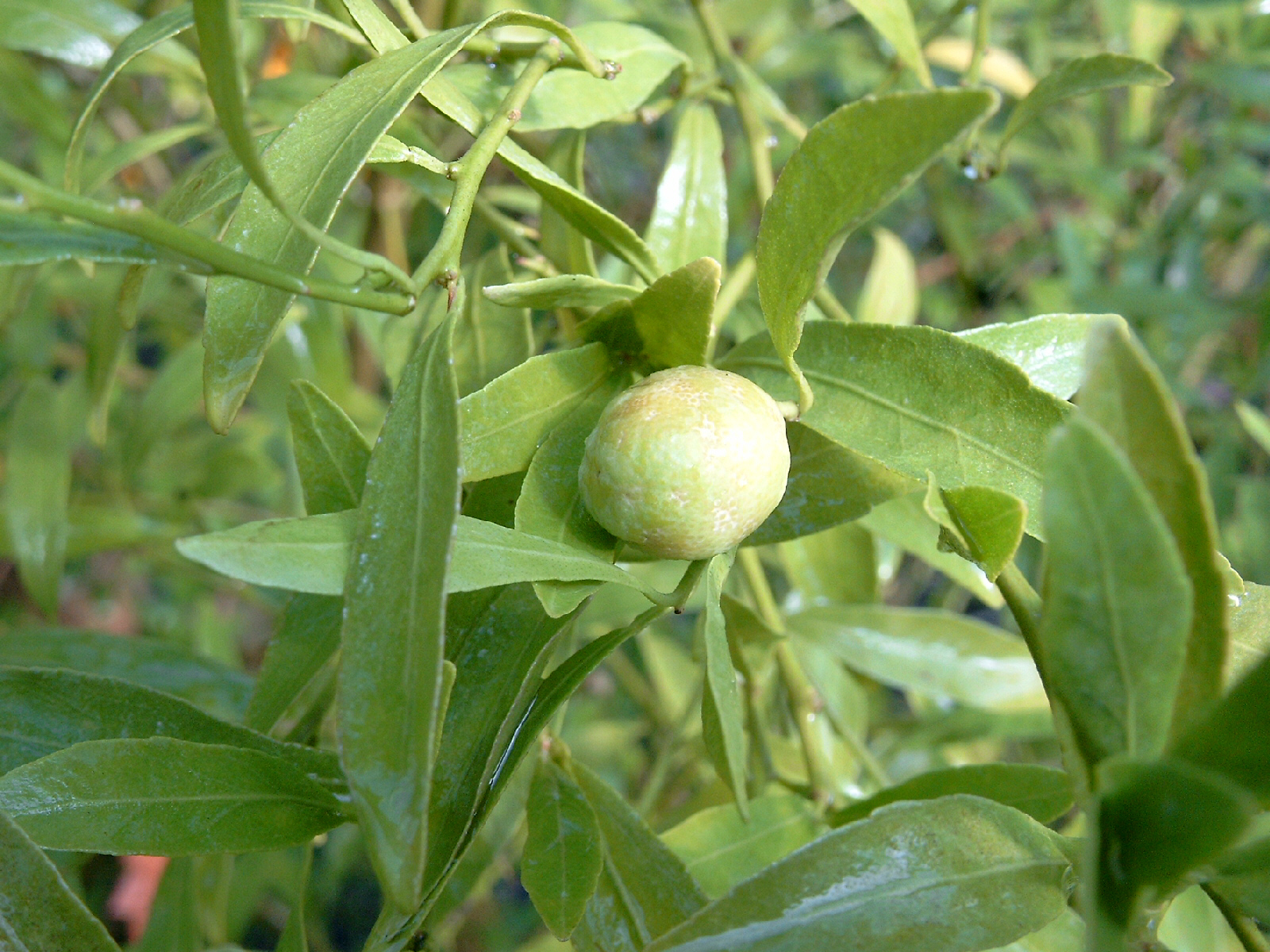
The eremolemon, a hybrid with Citrus meyeri

The eremolemon is thought to be a natural true-breeding hybrid between Citrus glauca and Citrus meyeri. Citrus plants hybridise readily, other hybrids include eremoranges, eremoradias (hybrid with a sour orange) and citrangeremos (hybrid with a citrange).
