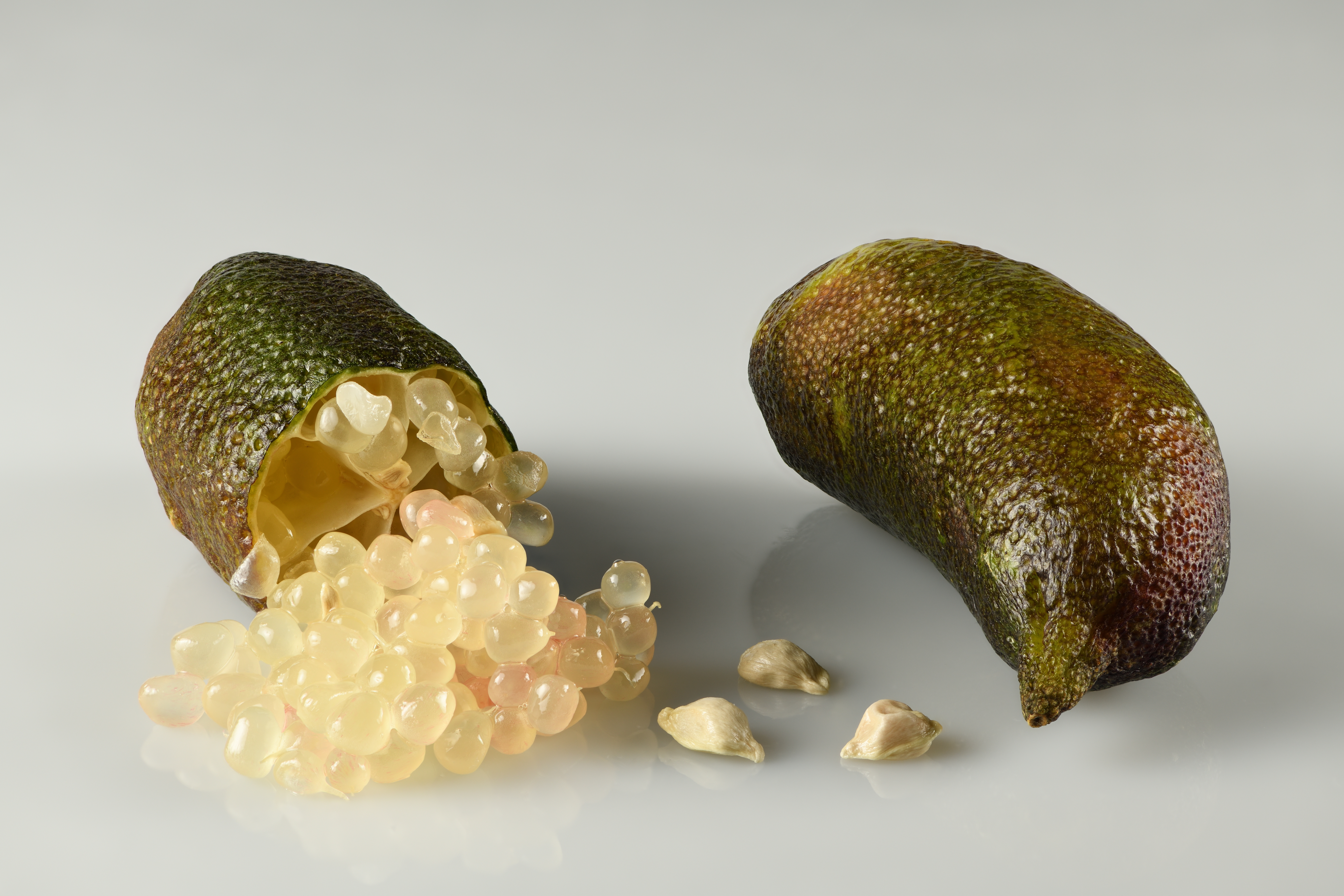
- Finger lime fruits - whole and one with juice vesicles and seeds partially extracted

Conservation status
- Least Concern (IUCN 3.1)

Scientific classification
- Kingdom: Plantae
- Clade: Embryophytes
- Clade: Tracheophytes
- Clade: Angiosperms
- Clade: Eudicots
- Clade: Rosids
- Order: Sapindales
- Family: Rutaceae
- Genus: Citrus
- Species: C. australasica

Binomial name
- Citrus australasica F.Muell.

Synonyms
- Microcitrus australasica (F.Muell.) Swingle; Citrus australasica var. sanguinea F.M.Bailey; Microcitrus australasica var. sanguinea (F.M.Bailey) Swingle

= Citrus australasica =

Species of flowering plant

Citrus australasica, the finger lime or caviar lime, is a thorny understorey shrub or small tree of lowland subtropical rainforest in the coastal border region of Queensland and New South Wales, Australia. It has edible fruits which are grown as a commercial crop.

== Description ==
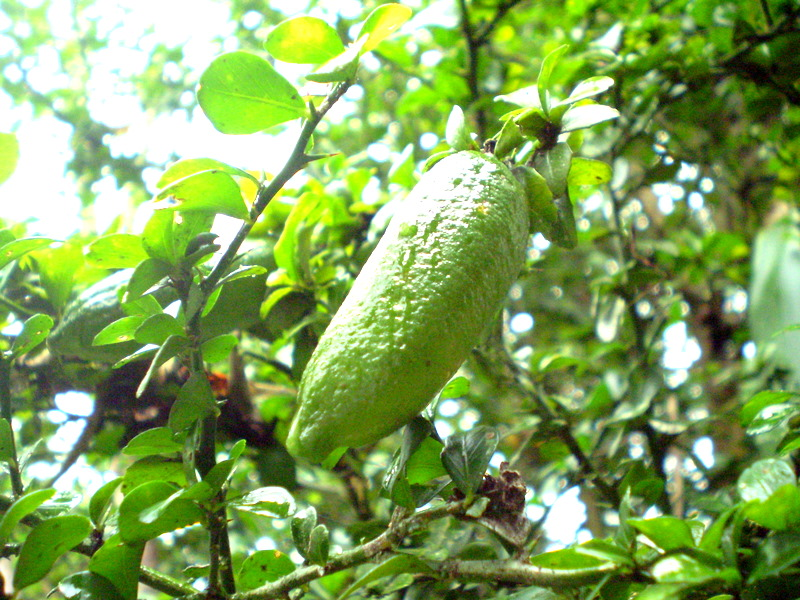
Fruit on the tree

Citrus australasica is a shrub or small tree to about 10 m (33 ft) tall with sharp spines up to 2.5 cm (1 in) long in the leaf axils. The leaves are light green in colour, obovate or rhombic in shape, and arranged alternately along the twigs. They measure up to 2.5 cm (1 in) wide and long, but may reach 5 cm (2 in) long, and they may be faintly crenate (scalloped) towards the apex. Like many other plants in the genus, the leaves contain numerous oil glands and are aromatic when crushed.

The flowers are either solitary or paired and are set on peduncles about 3 mm (0.12 in) long. The sepals are tiny, about 1.5 mm (0.06 in) long, the white petals are up to 9 mm (0.35 in) long. Stamens number between 20 and 25.

The fruit is a botanical berry, cylindrical and tapered at both ends, slightly curved and about 8 cm (3.1 in) long. The skin is rough with numerous oil glands, and greenish yellow to pink. They contain numerous pale seeds about 7 mm (0.28 in) long.

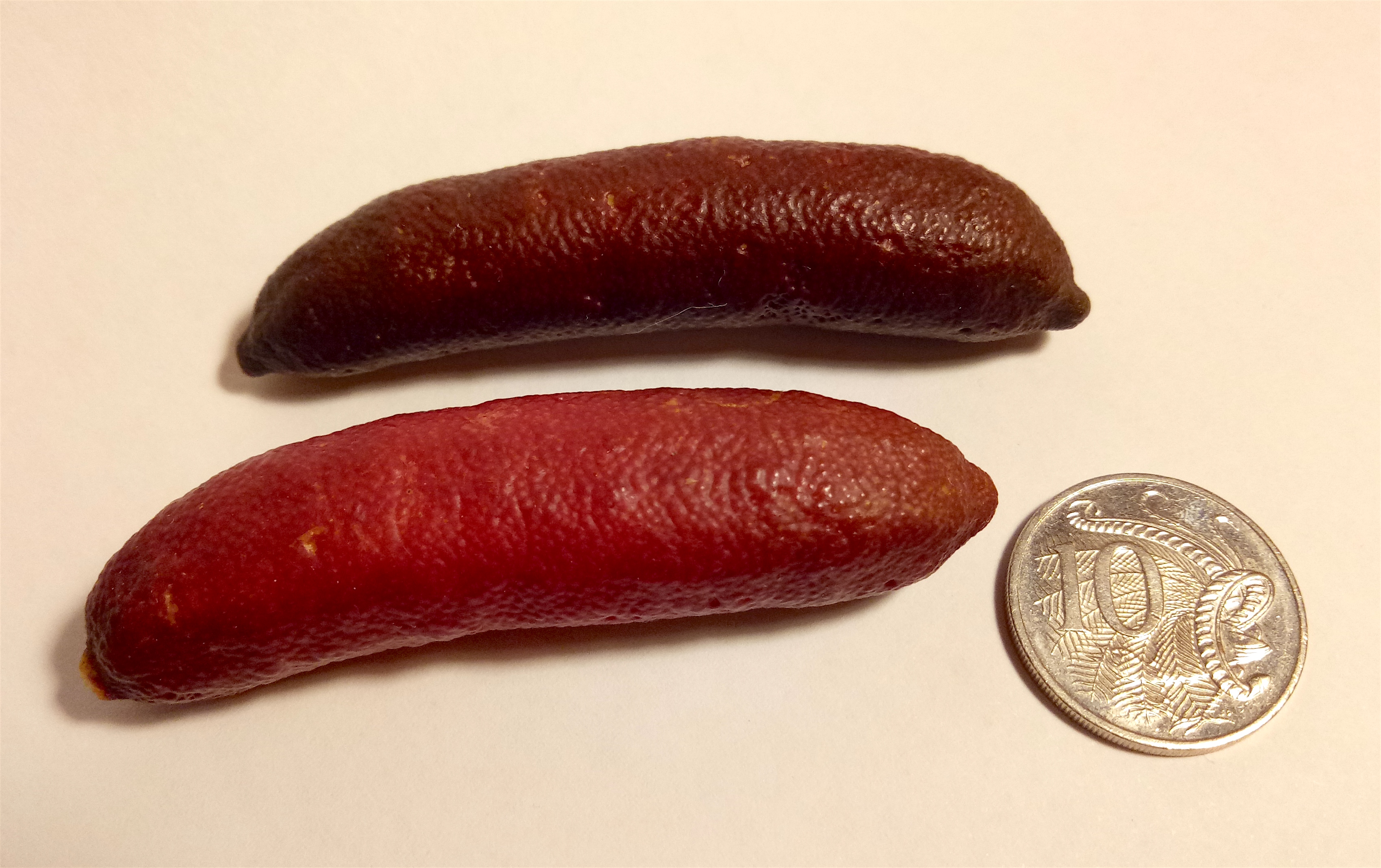
Two red finger limes, shown next to an Australian ten-cent coin (23 mm (0.91 in) diameter)

== Taxonomy ==
This species was first described by Australian botanist Ferdinand von Mueller, and was published in the first volume of his massive work Fragmenta phytographiæ Australiæ in 1858. American botanist Walter Tennyson Swingle, in a 1915 review of the genus Citrus, placed all four Australian species in a new genus Microcitrus, based on morphological features which he said gave "[...] these plants a very different aspect from the commonly cultivated species of Citrus." However, in a paper published in 1998, British botanist David Mabberley discussed the mix of morphological features present throughout the subtribe Citrineae (genera Clymenia, Eremocitrus, Fortunella, Microcitrus and Poncirus) and the ease with which species can be crossed, and subsequently restored the finger lime to Citrus.

== Distribution and habitat ==
The finger lime is native to the southeastern corner of Queensland and the northeastern corner of New South Wales, from the area around Brisbane to the Clarence River. It grows in coastal rainforest and extends into neighbouring open forest, often on soils derived from basalt. It is favoured by disturbance.

- Australian limes
  - former Eremocitrus
    Citrus glauca
  - former Microcitrus
    - Citrus warburgiana
    - - - Citrus inodora
        - Citrus maideniana
      - - Citrus garrawayi
        - Citrus australasica
      - Citrus australis

== Conservation ==
As of December 2024, this species has been assessed to be of least concern by the International Union for Conservation of Nature (IUCN) and by the Queensland Government under its Nature Conservation Act.

== Pests and diseases ==
The finger lime is susceptible to a range of insect pests, including scale insects, katydids, larvae of various moths and butterflies, some bugs, grasshoppers and others. However, it is not a host to the Queensland fruit fly Bactrocera tryoni, saving Australian growers the extra burden of treatment before export.

Research conducted since the 1970s indicated that a wild selection of C. australasica was highly resistant to Phytophthora citrophthora root disease, which has resulted in a cross-breeding program with finger lime to develop disease-resistant citrus rootstock. In 2020, researchers began working with C. australasica to develop solutions for Citrus greening disease.

== Cultivation and uses ==
=== History ===
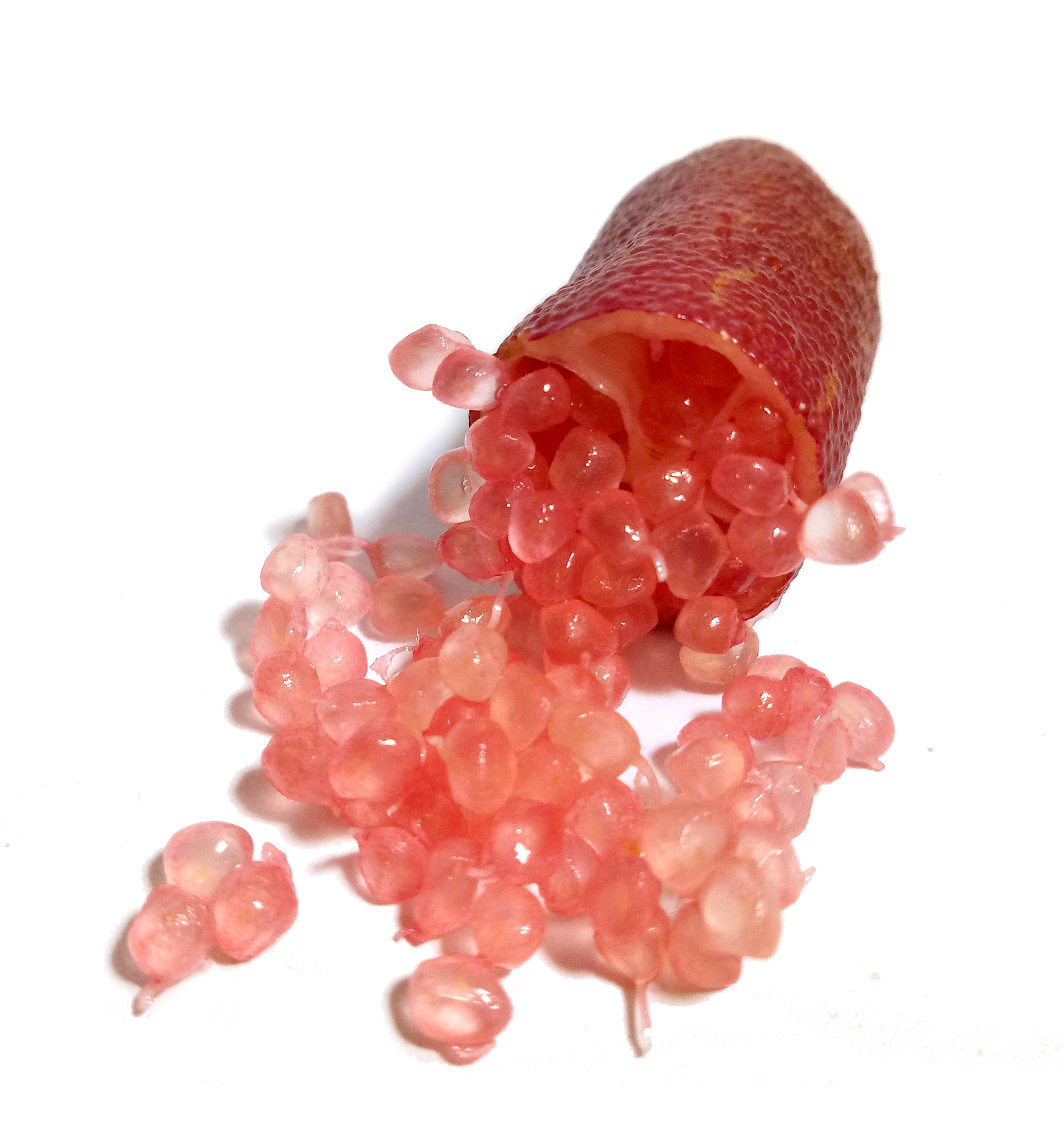
Red finger lime with juice vesicles partially extracted

First Peoples living along the east coast of Australia used finger limes for hydration and to treat skin infections and cuts. The fruits contain the nutrients vitamin C, folate and potassium, as well as the antioxidants vitamin E and polyphenols, and research has shown the efficiency of vitamin C as a treatment for bacterial infections.

Early settlers consumed the fruit and retained the trees when clearing for agriculture. Colonial botanists suggested that they should be cultivated, due to the lack of citrus alternatives.

=== Rising demand ===
The finger lime has been popularised as a gourmet bushfood. The globular juice vesicles (also known as pearls) have been called "lime caviar", and can be used as a garnish or added to various recipes. The fresh vesicles have the effect of a burst of effervescent tangy flavour as they are chewed. The juice is acidic and similar to that of a lime. Marmalade and pickles are also made from finger lime. Finger lime peel can be dried and used as a spice.

Commercial use of finger lime fruit started in the mid-1990s with boutique marmalades made from wild harvested fruit. By 2000 the finger lime was being sold in restaurants, and exported fresh.

The finger lime is grown on a commercial basis in Australia in response to high demand for the fruit. There is an increasing range of genetic selections which are budded onto citrus rootstock. With the sudden high market demand for the fruit the primary source of genetic material for propagation has been selections from wild stock.

The CSIRO has also developed several Citrus hybrids by crossing the finger lime with standard Citrus species, creating cultivars which produce finger limes in many different colours ranging from light pink to deep blue-green. Finger lime is thought to have the widest range of colour variation within any Citrus species.

== Gallery ==
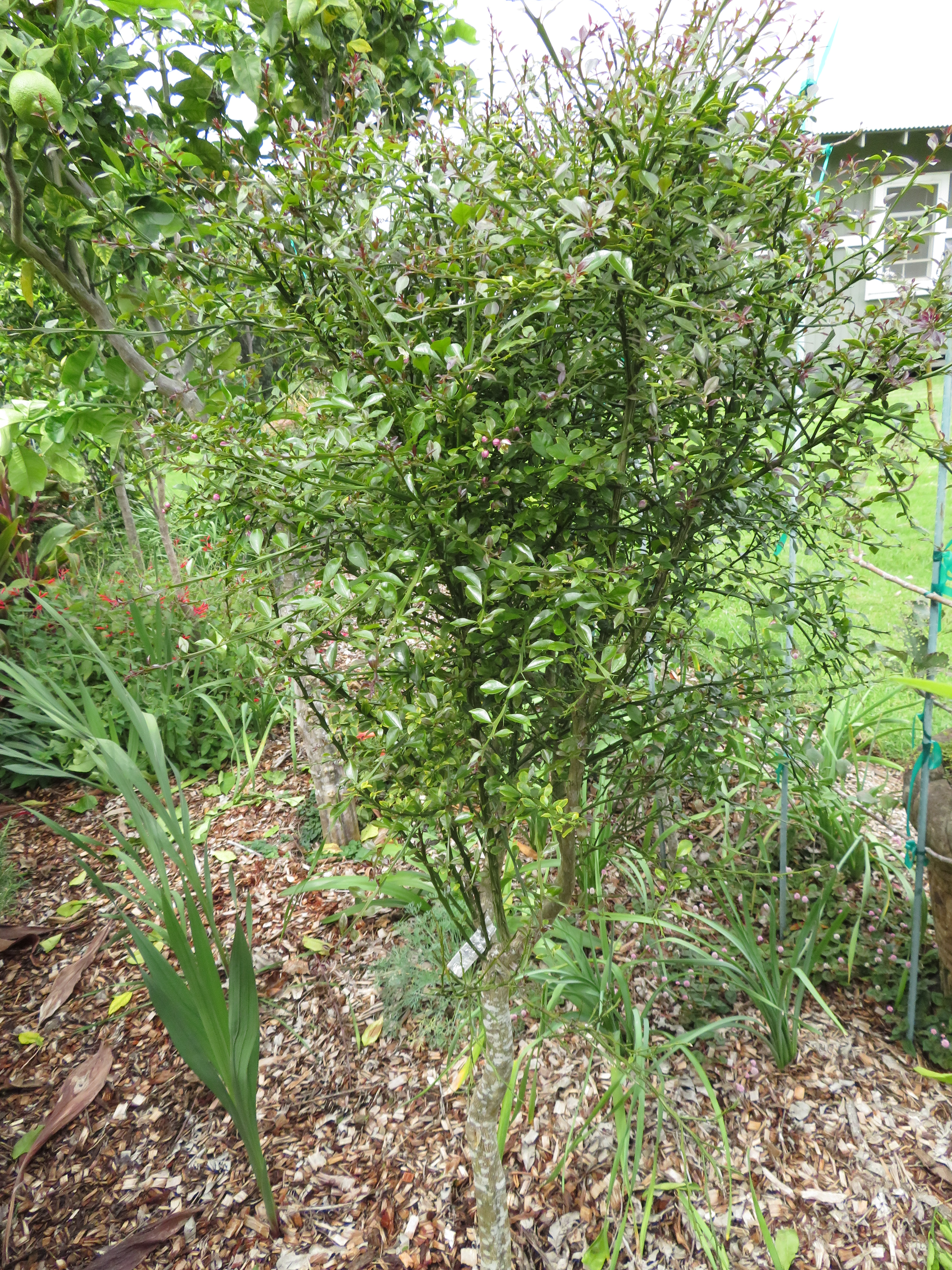
Habit

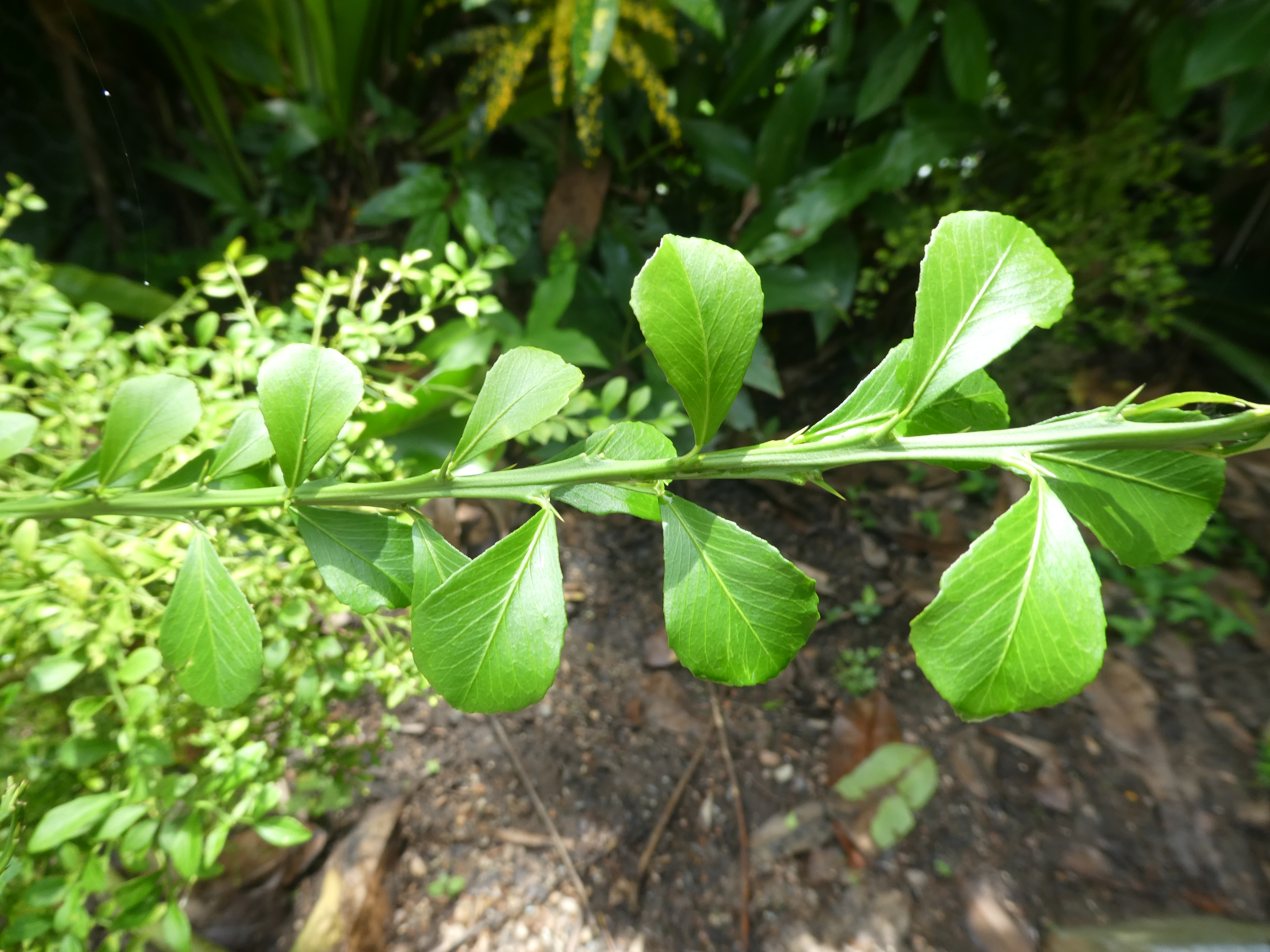
Foliage and thorns

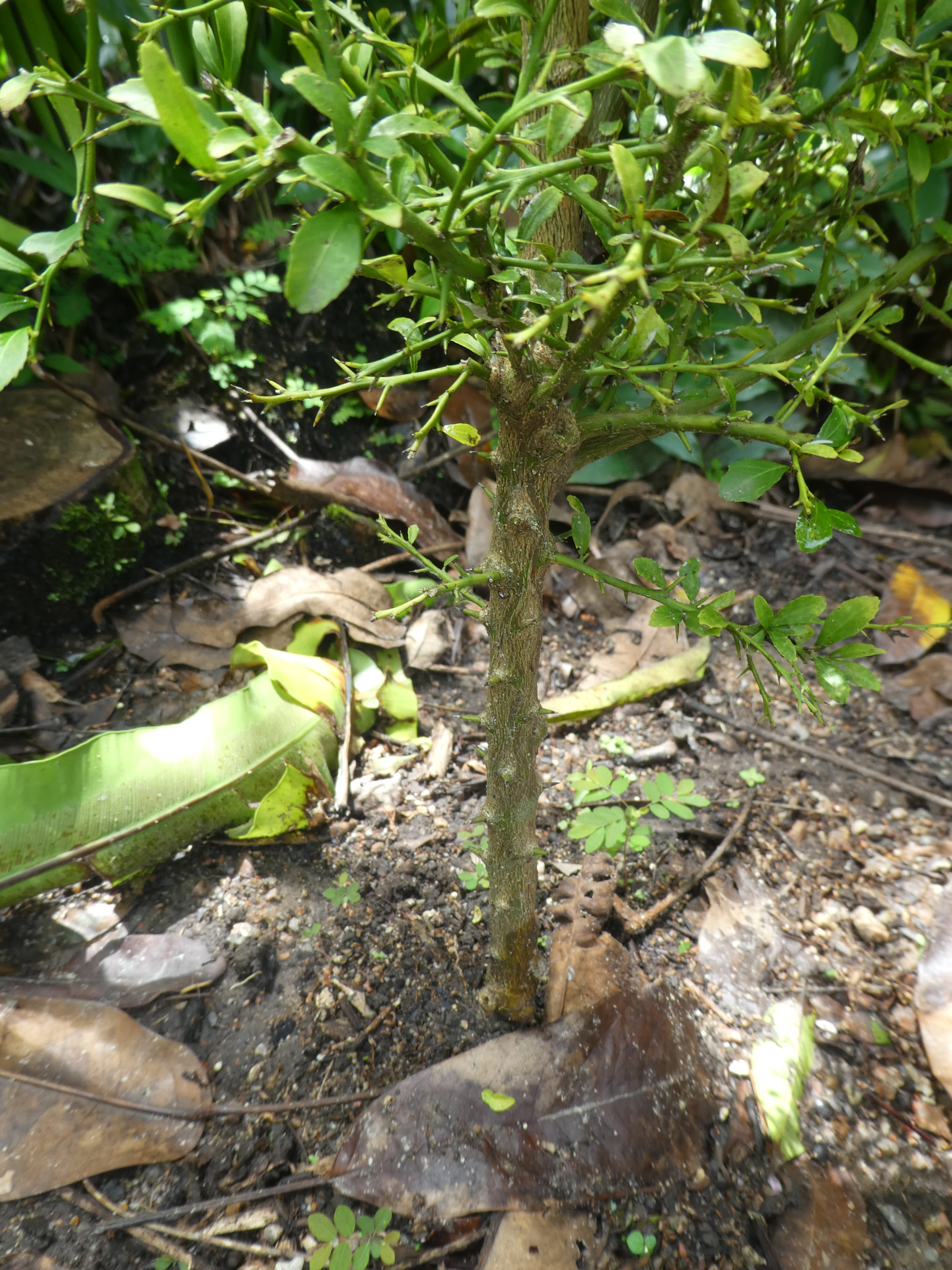
Stem with thorns

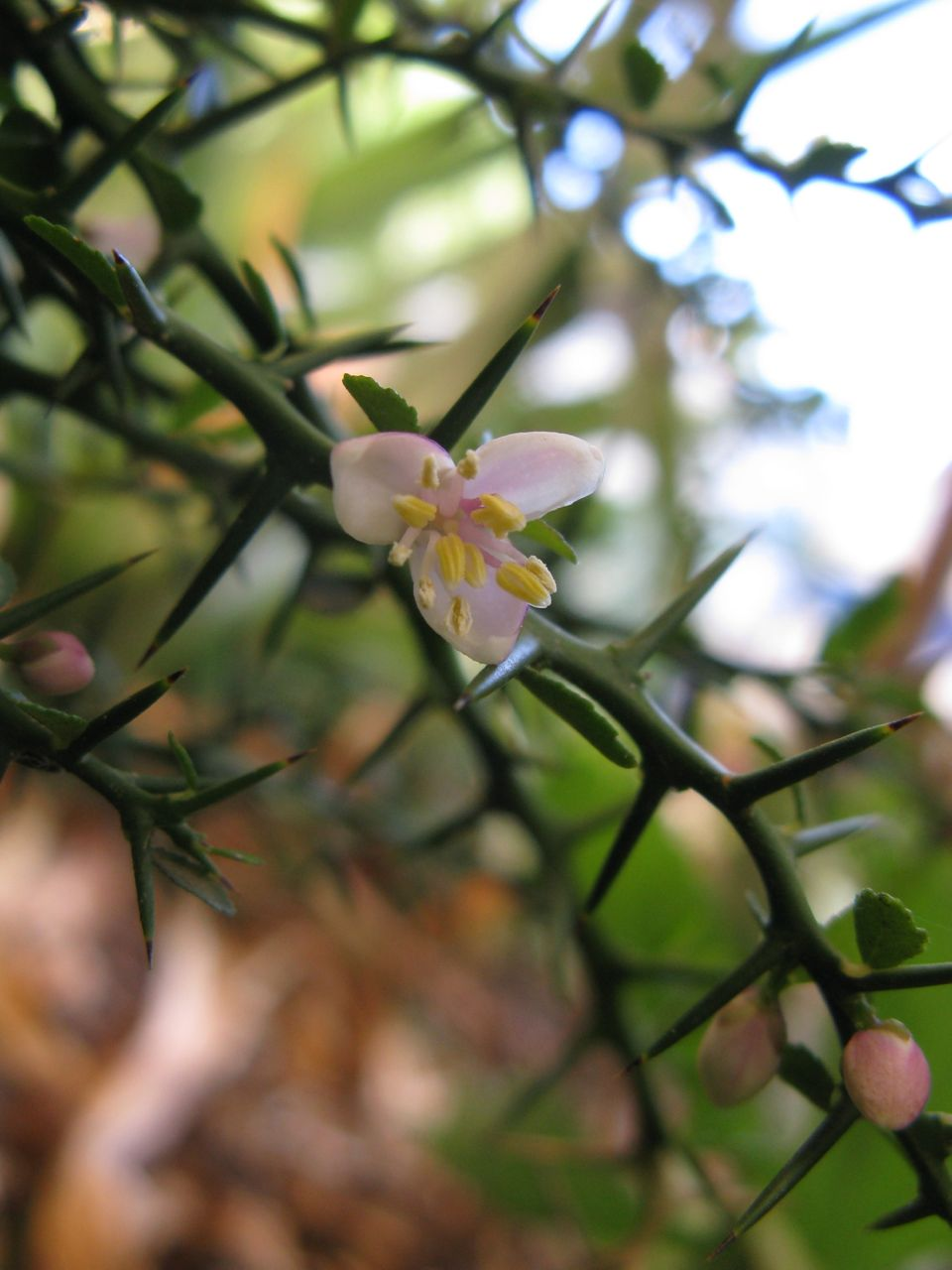
Flower

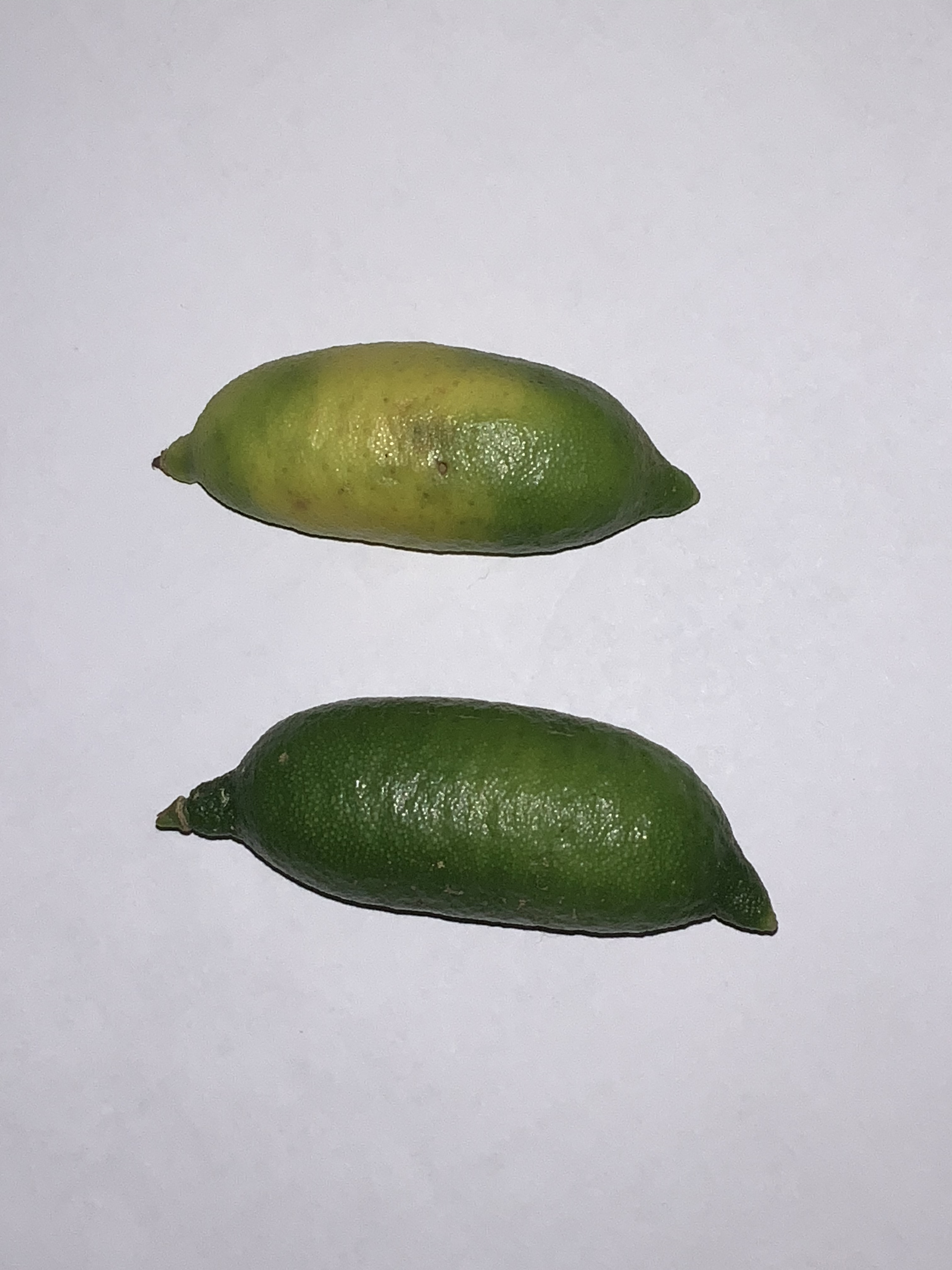
Fruit
