= Citrus wintersii =

Brown River finger lime

Scientific classification
- Kingdom: Plantae
- Clade: Tracheophytes
- Clade: Angiosperms
- Clade: Eudicots
- Clade: Rosids
- Order: Sapindales
- Family: Rutaceae
- Genus: Citrus
- Species: C. wintersii

Binomial name
- Citrus wintersii Mabb.

Synonyms
- Microcitrus papuana Winters 1976, not Citrus papuana F.M.Bailey 1901.

Species of shrub

Citrus wintersii, the Brown River finger lime, is a shrub native to the Brown River region in Papua-New Guinea. It was previously known as Microcitrus papuana. It has, as the "finger" name suggests, a small, thin fruit, pointed at both ends. It grows near Port Moresby.

It is reportedly rarely more than 150 cm (4.9 ft) tall in the wild though specimens cultivated from seed in California have attained heights of over 300 cm (9.8 ft). Leaves are narrowly lanceolate, up to 30 mm (1.2 in) long. Fruit is green, never yellow.
