= Clapstick (disambiguation) =

A clapstick is an Australian Aboriginal musical instrument.

Clapstick may also refer to:

- Clapperboard, a device used in filmmaking and video production
- Clapper stick, a Native Californian musical instrument

== See also ==
- Clapper (musical instrument)
