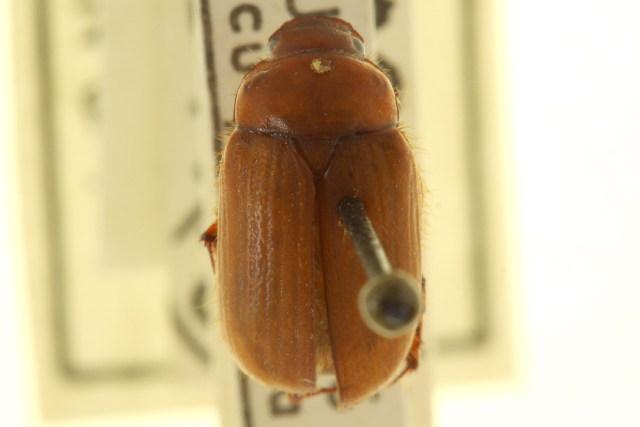

Scientific classification
- Kingdom: Animalia
- Phylum: Arthropoda
- Class: Insecta
- Order: Coleoptera
- Suborder: Polyphaga
- Infraorder: Scarabaeiformia
- Family: Scarabaeidae
- Genus: Serica
- Species: S. perigonia

Binomial name
- Serica perigonia Dawson, 1920

= Serica perigonia =

Species of beetle

Serica perigonia is a species of beetle of the family Scarabaeidae. It is found in the United States (California, Utah) and Mexico (Baja California).

== Description ==
Adults reach a length of about 8 mm. The colour is auburn. The surface is opaque, lightly covered with a greyish bloom or pollen, and showing traces of a brilliant iridescence.

== Subspecies ==
- Serica perigonia perigonia (California, Utah)
- Serica perigonia perigonia eremicola Dawson, 1967 (Baja California)

== Life history ==
Adults have been recorded feeding on Adenostoma fasciculatum, Abies concolor, flowers and foliage of Eriogonum fasciculatum, flowers of Malosoma laurina, Sambucus mexicana and Adenostoma sparsifolium.
