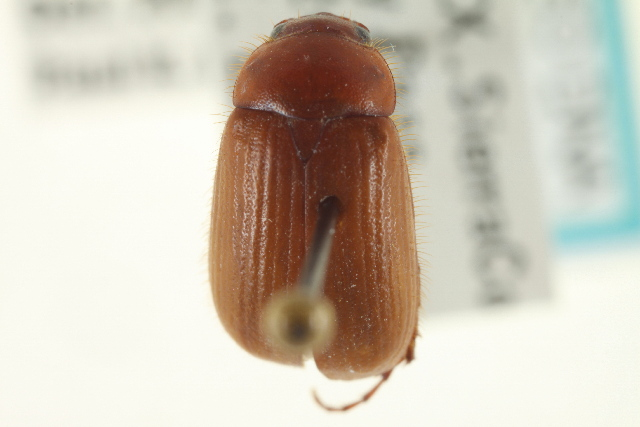

Scientific classification
- Kingdom: Animalia
- Phylum: Arthropoda
- Class: Insecta
- Order: Coleoptera
- Suborder: Polyphaga
- Infraorder: Scarabaeiformia
- Family: Scarabaeidae
- Genus: Serica
- Species: S. alternata

Binomial name
- Serica alternata LeConte, 1856

Synonyms
- Paramaladera alternata

= Serica alternata =

Species of beetle

Serica alternata is a species of beetle of the family Scarabaeidae. It is found in the United States (California, Colorado, New Mexico, Utah) and Mexico (Baja California).

== Description ==
Adults reach a length of about 7-9.5 mm. The colour is dark chestnut and the surface is sub-shining with the elytra moderately iridescent.

== Subspecies ==
- Serica alternata alternata (California, Colorado, New Mexico, Utah, Baja California)
- Serica alternata exolita Dawson, 1933 (California)
- Serica alternata patruela Dawson, 1933 (California)

== Life history ==
Adults have been recorded feeding on the foliage of Prunus virginiana, as well as Quercus agrifolia, the flowers of Heteromeles arbutifolia, Ceanothus palmeri, Rhus trilobata, Abies concolor, Sambucus mexicana and Eriogonum fasciculatum.
