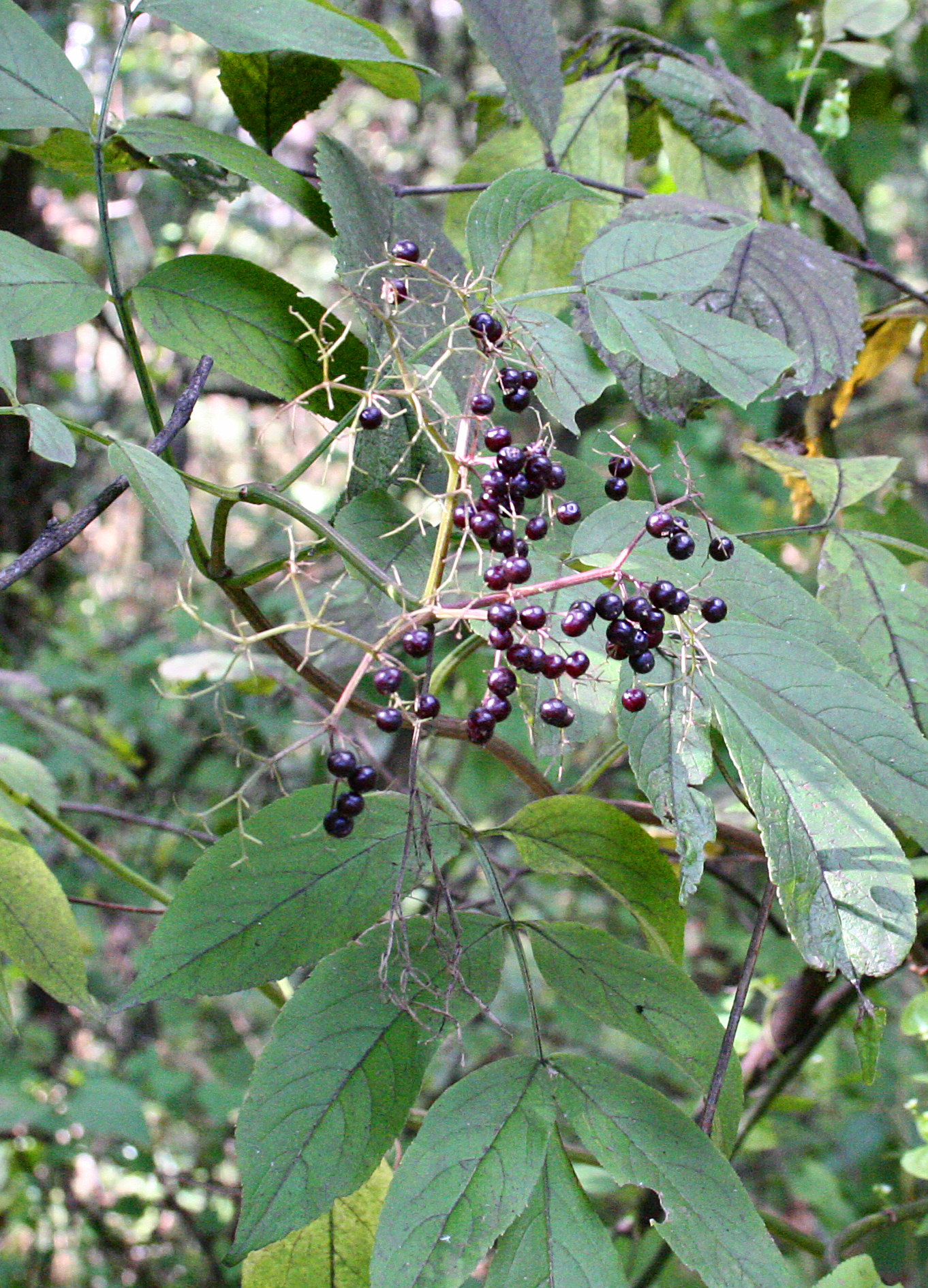
- Foliage and fruit

Conservation status
- Secure (NatureServe)

Scientific classification
- Kingdom: Plantae
- Clade: Tracheophytes
- Clade: Angiosperms
- Clade: Eudicots
- Clade: Asterids
- Order: Dipsacales
- Family: Viburnaceae
- Genus: Sambucus
- Species: S. canadensis

Binomial name
- Sambucus canadensis L.
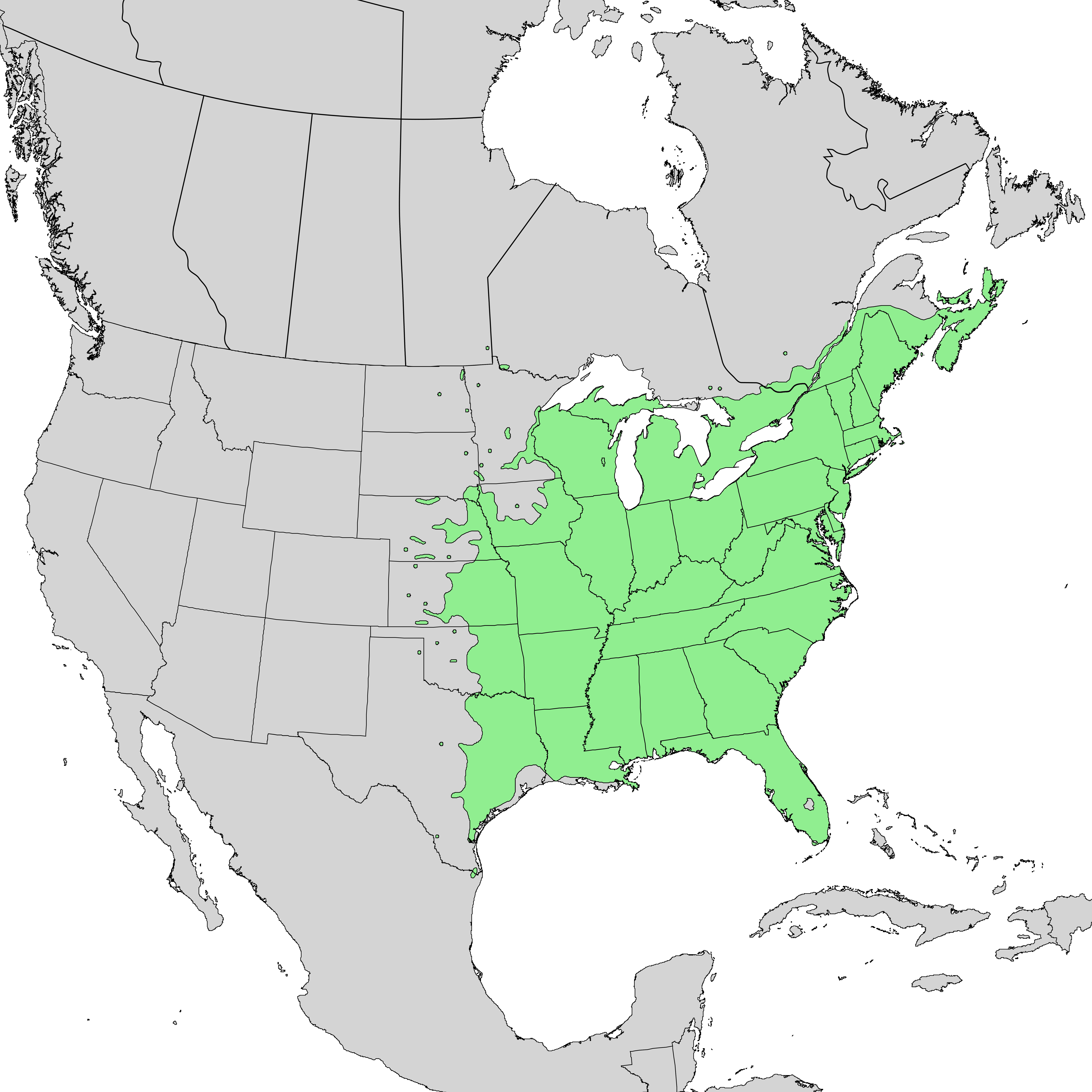
- Natural range of Sambucus canadensis in the United States and Canada

Synonyms
- Sambucus nigra subsp. canadensis (L.) Bolli; Sambucus mexicana C. Presl ex DC

= Sambucus canadensis =

Species of plant

Sambucus canadensis, the American black elderberry, Canada elderberry, or common elderberry, is a New World species of elderberry that forms a shrub primarily in temperate regions.

Most parts of the plant are toxic with cyanogenic glycosides, but the ripe berries can be cooked for food use with the seeds removed.

== Description ==
It is a deciduous suckering shrub growing to 6 metres (20 feet) tall. The leaves are arranged in opposite pairs, pinnate with five to eleven leaflets, the leaflets averaging 10 centimetres (4 inches) long and 4 cm broad.

In summer, it bears large corymbs, 20–30 cm or 8–12 in diameter, of white flowers above the foliage, the individual flowers 5–6 millimetres (3/16–1/4 in) diameter, with five petals. They are hermaphrodite and pollinated by insects. The fruit (known as an elderberry) is a dark purple to black berry 3–5 mm diameter, produced in drooping clusters in the fall.

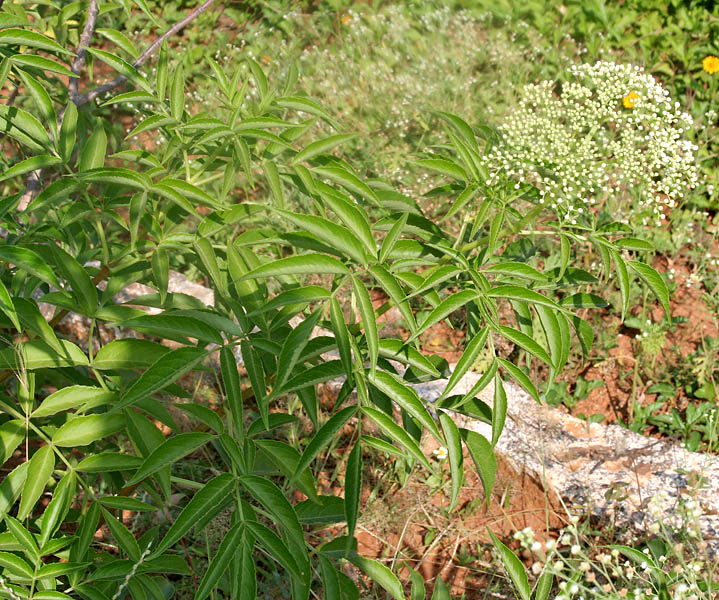
Foliage

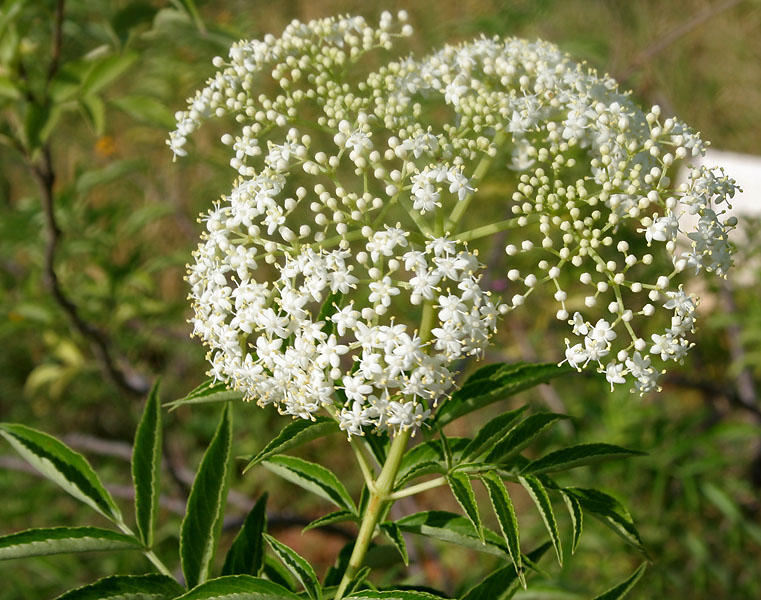
Flowers

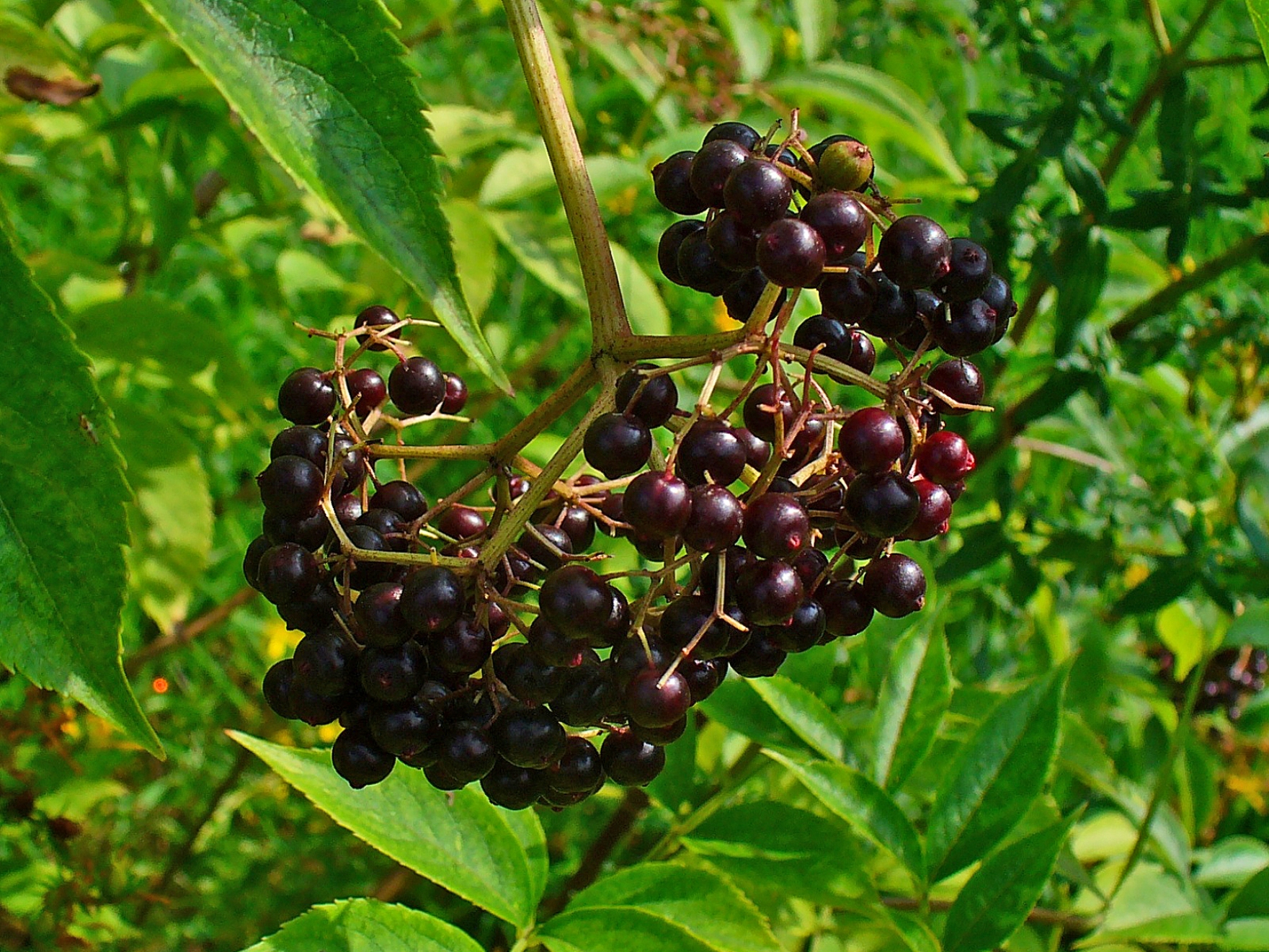
Fruits

== Taxonomy ==
It is closely related to the European Sambucus nigra. Some authors treat it as conspecific, under the name Sambucus nigra subsp. canadensis.

=== Etymology ===
The genus name comes from the Greek word sambuce, an ancient wind instrument, in reference to the removal of pith from the twigs of this and other species to make whistles.

== Distribution and habitat ==
The species is native to a large area of North America east of the Rocky Mountains, south throughout the mainland Americas to Bolivia. It is considered introduced in the Caribbean, Europe, Africa, and Asia.

S. canadensis is primarily found in habitat types such as marshes, swamps, and open woodland floodplains, among others. It grows in full sun to partial shade and can tolerate moist sandy to clay soil with a medium pH.

== Toxicity ==
Inedible parts of the plant, such as the leaves, stems, roots, seeds and unripe fruits, can be toxic due to the presence of cyanogenic glycosides and alkaloids.

== Uses ==
Traditional methods of consuming elderberry includes sweetened jams, jellies, and syrups, all of which cook down the fruit and strain out the seeds. A drink can be made from soaking the flower heads in water for eight hours. Other uses for the fruit include wine, jelly and dye. The leaves and inner bark may be used as an insecticide and a dye.

The boiled inner bark of the elderberry was used by the Iroquois of North America as a pain reliever in toothaches, being applied to the side of the cheek that was most virulent.

Extracts of the flowers and fruits are marketed to relieve cold and flu symptoms, with limited research indicating effectiveness for such symptoms. There is insufficient high-quality clinical evidence to establish its efficacy for the treatment of any disease.

=== FDA warning letters ===
Between 2021 and 2023, the US Food and Drug Administration issued 18 warning letters to American supplement companies falsely advertising elderberry products intended to treat diseases. The main category of the warnings was for the marketing of "unapproved new and misbranded drugs".

A typical warning letter stated that the "products are not generally recognized as safe and effective for the above referenced uses and, therefore, the products are “new drugs”... which "may not be legally introduced or delivered for introduction into interstate commerce without prior approval from FDA", and that a new drug is approved "on the basis of scientific data and information demonstrating that the drug is safe and effective".
