= Sambucus × strumpfii =

Scientific classification
- Kingdom: Plantae
- Clade: Tracheophytes
- Clade: Angiosperms
- Clade: Eudicots
- Clade: Asterids
- Order: Dipsacales
- Family: Viburnaceae
- Genus: Sambucus
- Species: S. × strumpfii

Binomial name
- Sambucus × strumpfii Gutte
- It is native to Germany, Denmark, Sweden, and Poland

Species of plant

Sambucus × strumpfii is a natural hybrid of Sambucus nigra and Sambucus racemosa in the family Viburnaceae native to Germany, Denmark, Sweden, and Poland.

== Description ==
Parent species of
Sambucus × strumpfii
Gutte

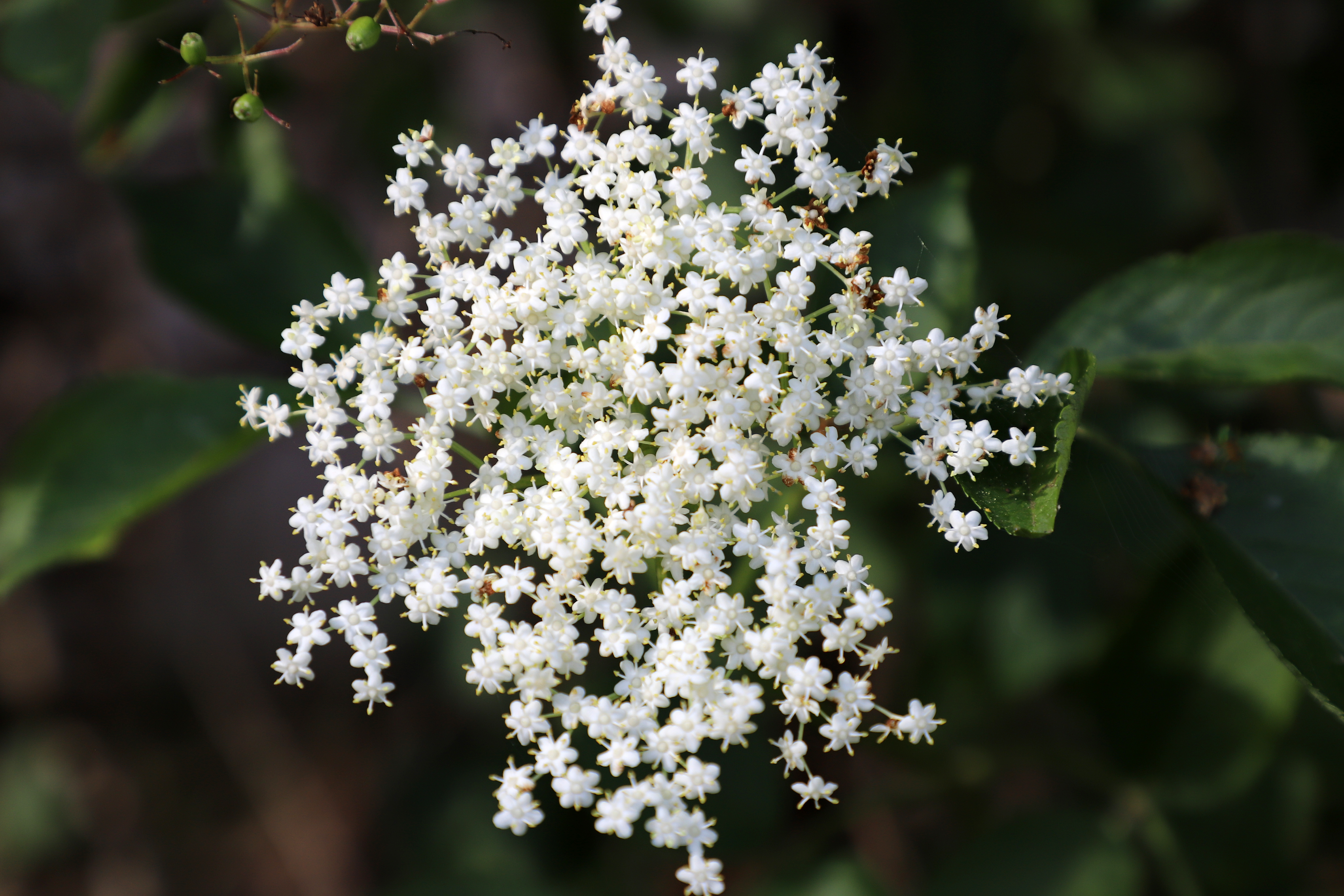
Sambucus nigra L.

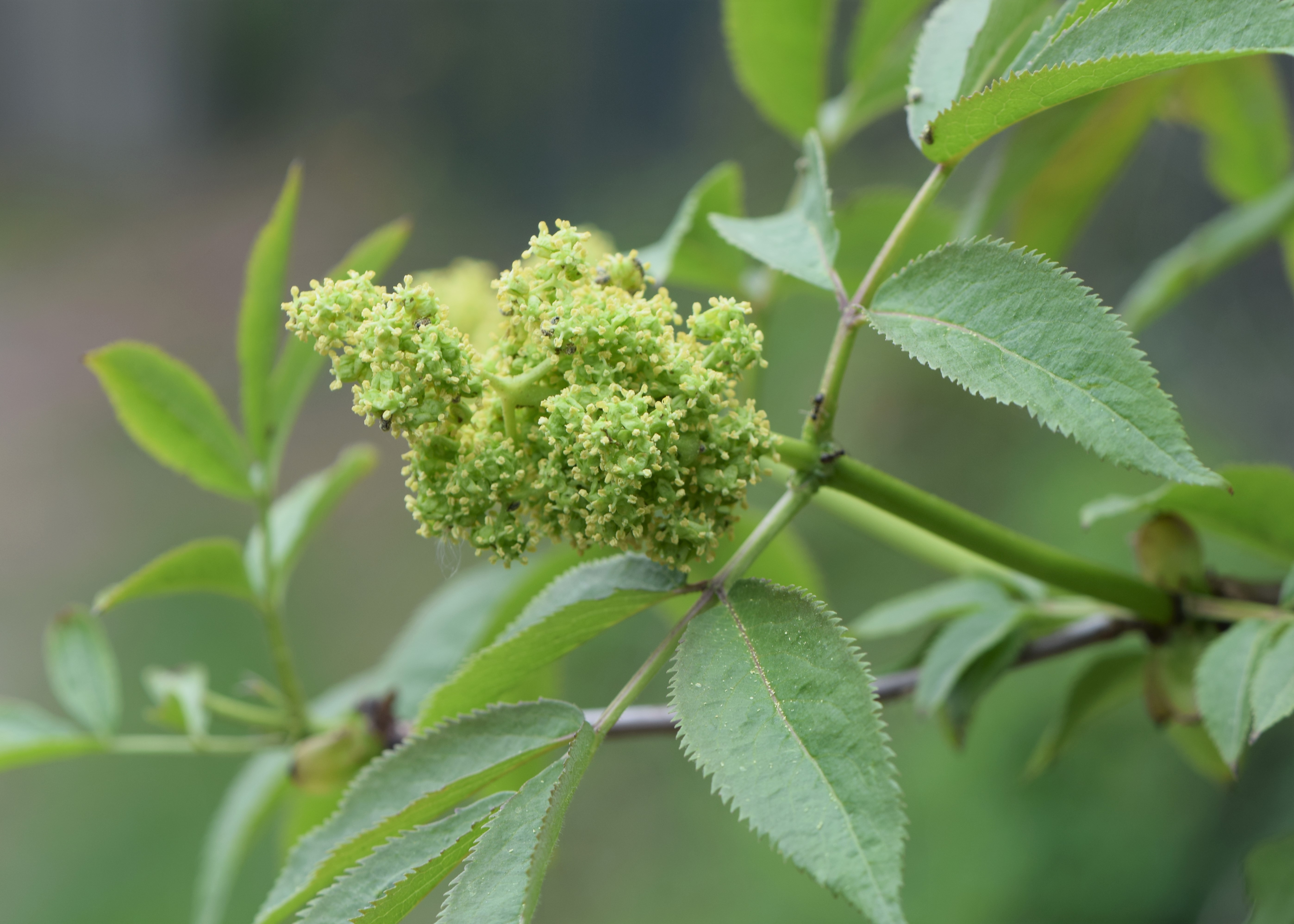
Sambucus racemosa L.

=== Vegetative characteristics ===
It is an up to 5 m tall shrub with bright green leaves. The pith is white to beige.

=== Generative characteristics ===
The flattened inflorescence without a dominant central axis bears faintly green flowers. The stamens mostly produce small, immature, unviable pollen grains. The flowers have four carpels. The shiny fruit has a reddish-black colouration, but many flowers fail to set fruit.

== Taxonomy ==
It was described by Peter Gutte in 2006. The plant was found by Klaus Strumpf in 1996 near Altenburg, Germany and was given to the Leipzig Botanical Garden. The type specimen was then collected by Peter Gutte on the 25th of April 2003. The original specimen found by Klaus Strumpf has died.

=== Etymology ===
The hybrid name strumpfii honours the German botanist Klaus Strumpf.

== Distribution and habitat ==
It is native to Germany, Denmark, Sweden, and Poland.
