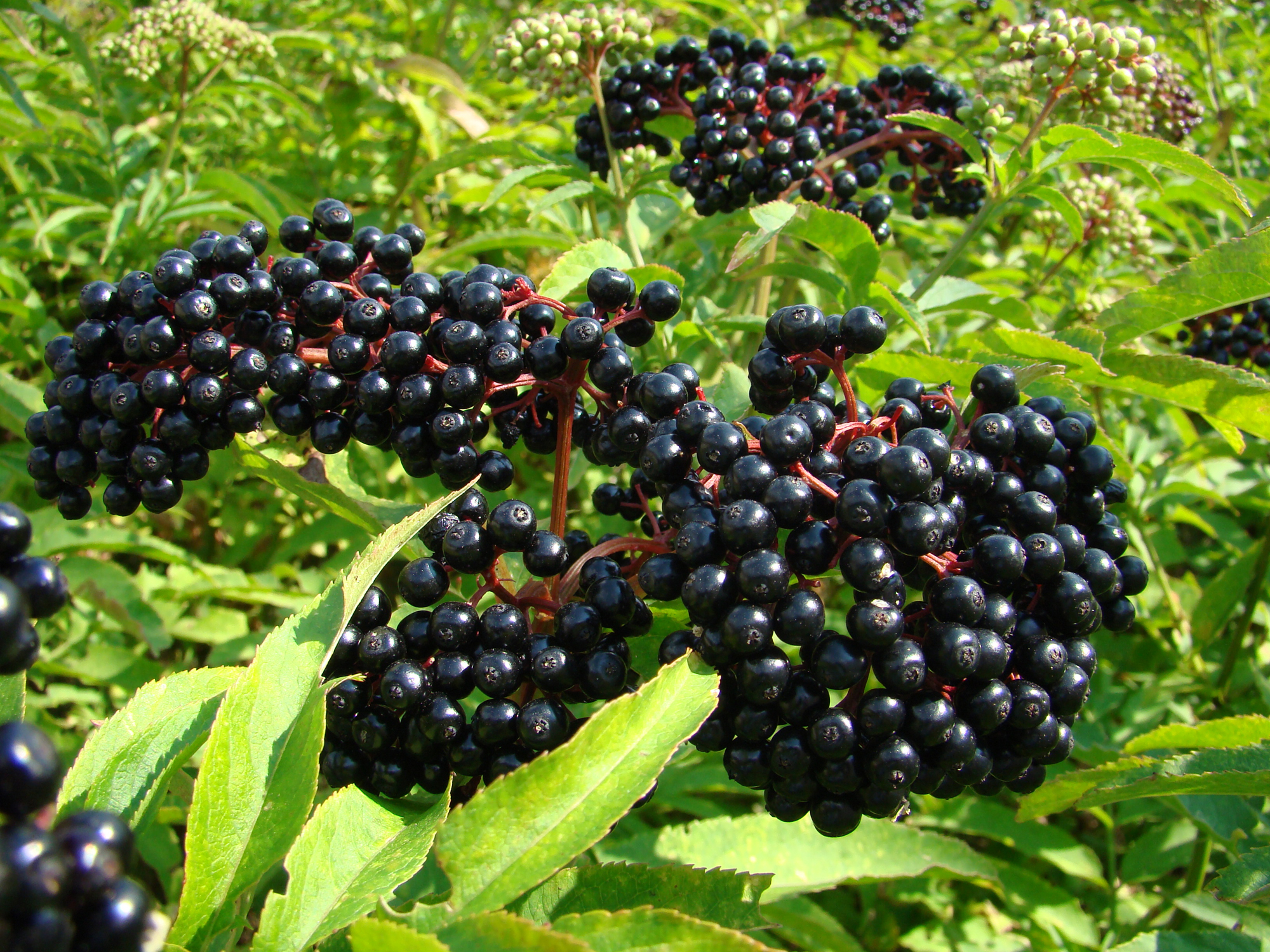
- Sambucus ebulus berries (elderberries)

Scientific classification
- Kingdom: Plantae
- Clade: Tracheophytes
- Clade: Angiosperms
- Clade: Eudicots
- Clade: Asterids
- Order: Dipsacales
- Family: Viburnaceae
- Genus: Sambucus; L.

Species
- See text

= Sambucus =

Genus of flowering plants

Sambucus is a genus of between 20 and 30 species of flowering plants in the family Viburnaceae. The various species are commonly referred to as elder, with the flowers as elderflower, and the fruit as elderberry. The genus is represented by species native to temperate and subtropical climates in most parts of the world, including Eurasia, the Americas, Africa and Australia, and has been introduced to other regions of similar climates.

== Description ==
Elders are mostly fast-growing shrubs or small trees 3–10 m (9.8–32.8 ft) (rarely to 14 m (46 ft)) tall, with a few species being herbaceous plants 1–2 m (3 ft 3 in – 6 ft 7 in) tall. The oppositely arranged leaves are pinnate with 5–9 leaflets (or, rarely, 3 or 11). Each leaf is 5–30 centimetres (2–12 in) long, and the leaflets have serrated margins. They bear large clusters of small white or cream-coloured flowers in late spring or early summer; these are followed by clusters of small berries that are green when immature, ripening black, blue-black, or red (rarely yellow or white).

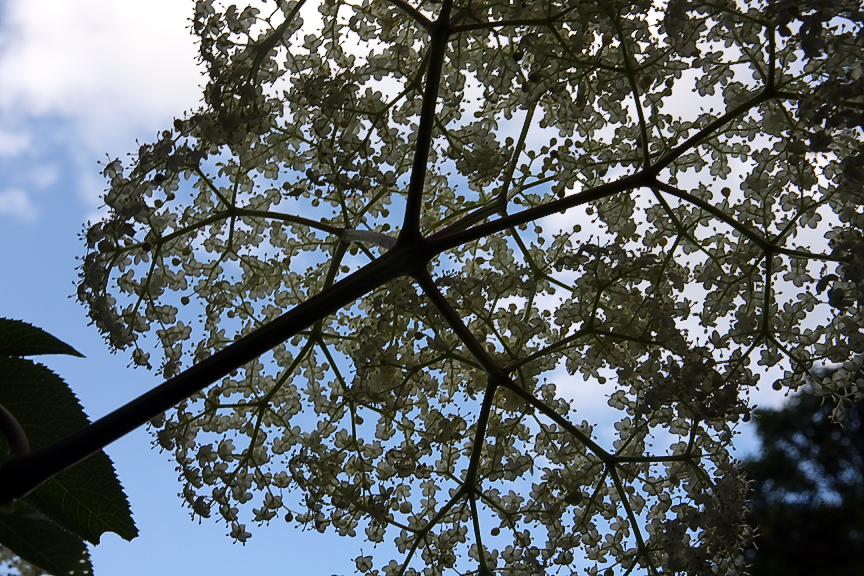
S. canadensis branches and inflorescence

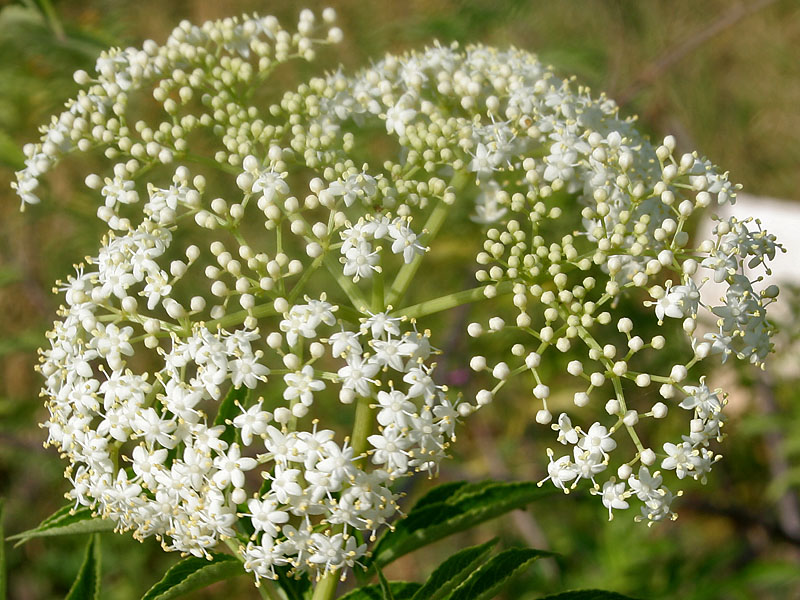
Inflorescence of S. canadensis

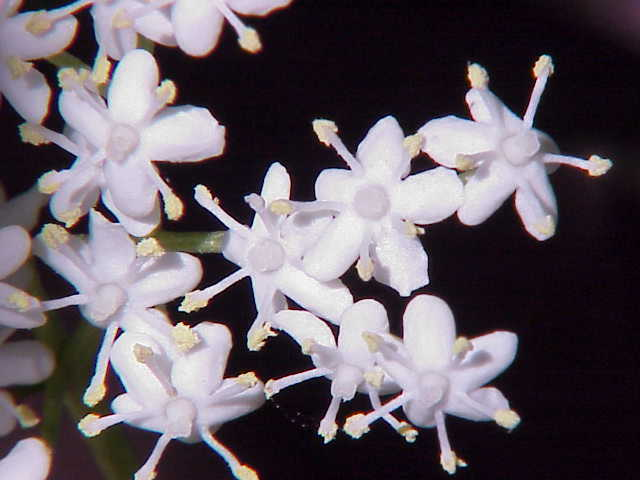
Flowers of S. nigra

== Taxonomy ==
The genus name comes from the Ancient Greek word σαμβύκη (sambū́kē) referring to an ancient wind instrument, relating to the removal of the twigs' pith to make it.

The taxonomy of the genus Sambucus L., originally described by Carl Linnaeus and hence its botanical authority, has been complicated by its wide geographical distribution and morphological diversity. This has led to overdescription of the species and infraspecific taxa (subspecies, varieties or forms).

The genus was formerly placed in the family Caprifoliaceae, but was reclassified in the family Adoxaceae due to genetic and morphological comparisons to plants in the genus Adoxa. Adoxaceae was subsequently renamed to Viburnaceae.

Species accepted by Plants of the World Online in this genus as of September 2026 are:

- Sambucus adnata Wall. ex DC.
- Sambucus africana Standl.
- Sambucus australasica (Lindl.) Fritsch
- Sambucus australis Cham. & Schltdl.
- Sambucus canadensis L.
- Sambucus cerulea Raf.
- Sambucus ebulus L.
- Sambucus gaudichaudiana DC.
- Sambucus javanica Reinw. ex Blume
- Sambucus kamtschatica E.L.Wolf
- Sambucus lanceolata R.Br.
- Sambucus mexicana C.Presl ex DC.
- Sambucus nigra L.
- Sambucus palmensis Link
- Sambucus pendula Nakai
- Sambucus peruviana Kunth
- Sambucus racemosa L.
- Sambucus sibirica Nakai
- Sambucus sieboldiana (Miq.) Graebn.
- Sambucus × strumpfii Gutte
- Sambucus tigranii Troitsky
- Sambucus wightiana Wall. ex Wight & Arn.
- Sambucus williamsii Hance

Some other authors have accepted further species not accepted by Plants of the World Online:

- Sambucus latipinna – Korea, southeast Siberia = Sambucus williamsii
- Sambucus melanocarpa – western North America = Sambucus racemosa var. melanocarpa
- Sambucus microbotrys – southwest North America = Sambucus racemosa var. microbotrys
- Sambucus orbiculata – western North America = Sambucus canadensis
- Sambucus pubens – northern North America = Sambucus racemosa subsp. pubens
- Sambucus simpsonii – southeastern United States = Sambucus canadensis
- Sambucus velutin] – southwestern North America = Sambucus cerulea var. cerulea

== Distribution and habitat ==
The genus is represented by species native to most parts of the world, including Eurasia, the Americas, Africa and Australia, and has been distributed to other temperate and subtropical climates. It is more widespread in the Northern Hemisphere, with its Southern Hemisphere occurrence restricted to parts of Australasia and South America. Many species are widely cultivated for their ornamental leaves, flowers, and fruit.

Elder commonly grows near farms and homesteads. It is a nitrogen-tolerant plant and thus is often found near places of organic waste disposal. Elders are often grown as a hedgerow plant in Britain since they take very fast, can be bent into shape easily, and grow quite profusely, thus having gained the reputation of being an "instant hedge". It is not generally affected by soil type or pH level and will grow virtually anywhere sufficient sunlight is available.

== Ecology ==
The berries are consumed by birds and mammals. In Northern California, elderberries are eaten by migrating band-tailed pigeons. Elders are used as food plants by the larvae of some Lepidoptera species including brown-tail, buff ermine, dot moth, emperor moth, engrailed moth, swallow-tailed moth and the V-pug. The crushed foliage and immature fruit have a strong fetid smell. Valley elderberry longhorn beetles in California are very often found around red or blue elderberry bushes. Females lay their eggs on the bark. Strong-scented flowers in wild populations of European elder (S. nigra) attract numerous, minute flower thrips which may contribute to the transfer of pollen between inflorescences.

== Cultivation ==
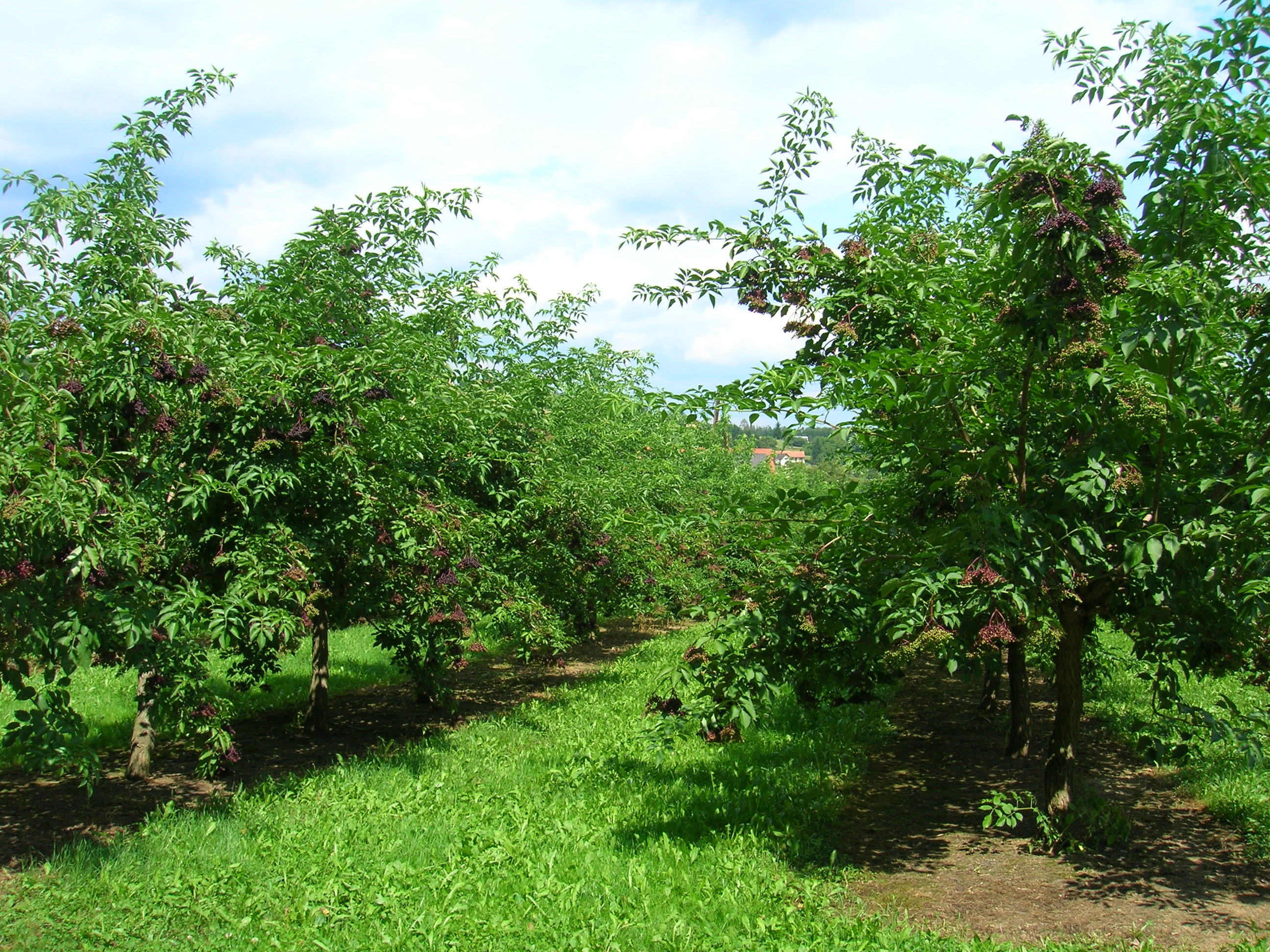
Cultivation in Austria

Traditional uses of Sambucus involved berries, seeds, leaves, and flowers or component extracts. Ornamental varieties of Sambucus are grown in gardens for their showy flowers, fruits and lacy foliage which support habitat for wildlife. Of the many native species, three are used as ornamentals: S. canadensis, S. nigra, and S. racemosa.

== Toxicity ==
Some species of the Sambucus genus produce toxic berries, leaves, roots, and stems. Leaves, twigs, branches, seeds, roots, flowers, and berries of some Sambucus plants produce cyanogenic glycosides, which have toxic properties. Ingesting a sufficient quantity of cyanogenic glycosides from berry juice, flower tea, or beverages made from fresh leaves, branches, and fruit has been shown to cause illness, including nausea, vomiting, abdominal cramps, diarrhea, and weakness. In August 1983, a group of 25 people in Monterey County, California, became ill after ingesting elderberry juice pressed from fresh, uncooked S. mexicana berries, leaves, and stems. The concentration of cyanogenic glycosides is higher in tea made from flowers (or leaves) than from the berries.

The berries and leaves of the species Sambucus nigra subsp. canadensis have been shown to lack cyanogenic glycosides. In a 2021 scientific analysis, commercial elderberry juice made from Sambucus nigra subsp. canadensis in Illinois, USA, had no trace of those glycosides. The authors also point out that the 1983 "poisoning" event in California which coincided with consumption of Sambucus cerulea, rather than Sambucus mexicana, was not caused by cyanide.

The seeds of Sambucus racemosa are reported to be poisonous and may cause vomiting or diarrhea.

Elderberries, raw Sambucus spp.
Nutritional value per 100 g (3.5 oz)
- Energy: 305 kJ (73 kcal)
- Carbohydrates: 18.4 g
- Dietary fibre: 7 g
- Fat: 0.5 g
- Protein: 0.66 g
Vitamins and minerals
Vitamins	Quantity %DV^{†}
Vitamin A equiv.	3% 30 μg
Thiamine (B1)	6% 0.07 mg
Riboflavin (B2)	5% 0.06 mg
Niacin (B3)	3% 0.5 mg
Pantothenic acid (B5)	3% 0.14 mg
Vitamin B6	14% 0.23 mg
Folate (B9)	2% 6 μg
Vitamin C	40% 36 mg
Minerals	Quantity %DV^{†}
Calcium	3% 38 mg
Iron	9% 1.6 mg
Magnesium	1% 5 mg
Phosphorus	3% 39 mg
Potassium	9% 280 mg
Zinc	1% 0.11 mg
- Other constituents: Quantity
- Water: 79.80 g
- Link to USDA Database entry
- ^{†}Percentages estimated using US recommendations for adults, except for potassium, which is estimated based on expert recommendation from the National Academies.

== Uses ==
The cooked berries (pulp and skin) of most species of Sambucus are edible.

=== Nutrition ===
Raw elderberries are 80% water, 18% carbohydrates, and less than 1% each of protein and fat (table). In a reference amount of 100 grams (3.5 oz), elderberries supply 73 calories of food energy, and are a rich source of vitamin C, providing 40% of the Daily Value (DV). Elderberries have a moderate content of vitamin B_{6}, with no other micronutrients in significant content (table).

=== Chemistry ===
Structure of anthocyanins, the blue pigments in elderberries

Sambucus fruit is rich in anthocyanidins that combine to give elderberry juice an intense blue-purple colour that turns reddish on dilution with water.

=== Dietary supplement ===
Elderberry fruit or flowers are marketed as dietary supplements intended to provide relief from minor diseases, such as flu or colds, and are served as a tea or extract in a capsule. However, there is no good evidence for the effectiveness or safety of elderberry extracts in treating respiratory diseases. Despite the absence of clinical trials to determine efficacy or safety, the marketing of elderberry supplements increased during the COVID-19 pandemic. The raw or unripe fruit of S. nigra or its extracts may contain a cyanogenic glycoside that is potentially toxic.

=== Traditional medicine ===
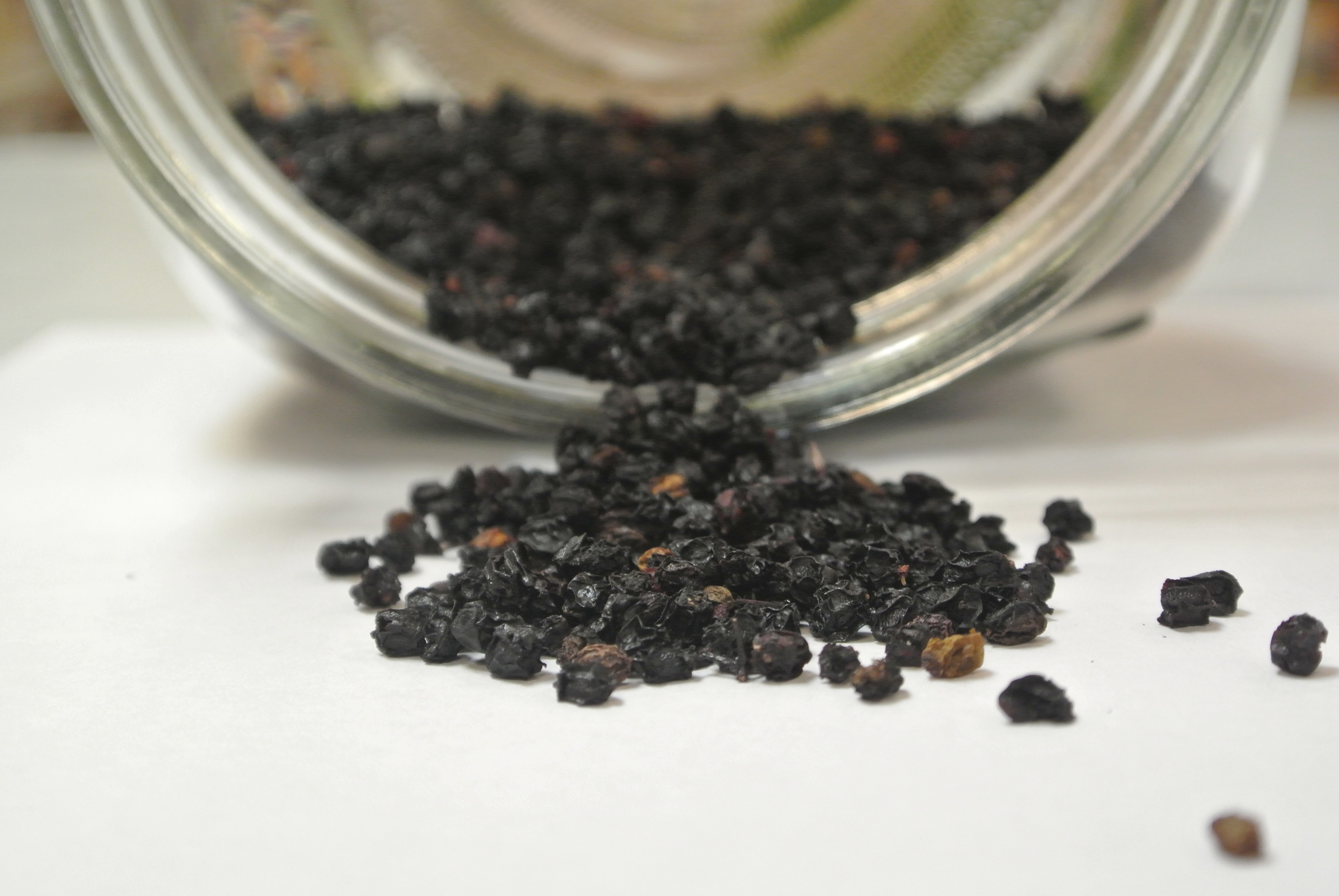
Dried elderberries ready for steeping

Although practitioners of traditional medicine have used elderberries over centuries, there is insufficient clinical evidence that such practices provide anti-disease or health benefits.

=== Pigments ===
The pigments are used as colourants in various products, and "elderberry juice color" is listed by the US Food and Drug Administration as allowable in certified organic food products. In Japan, elderberry juice is listed as an approved "natural colour additive" under the Food and Sanitation Law. Fibres can be dyed with elderberry juice (using alum as a mordant) to give a "muted purple" shade.

=== Other ===
The berry of S. racemosa can be made into wine. The flowers of S. nigra are used to produce elderflower cordial. St-Germain, a French liqueur, is made from elderflowers. Hallands Fläder, a Swedish akvavit, is flavoured with elderflowers.

Hollowed elderberry twigs have traditionally been used as spiles to tap maple trees for syrup. Additionally, they have been hollowed out and used as flutes, blowguns, and syringes. In addition, the elderberry twigs and fruit are employed in creating dyes for basketry: these stems are dyed a very deep black by soaking them in a wash made from the berry stems of the elderberry.

Elder pith has been used by watchmakers for cleaning tools before intricate work.

== In culture ==
Folklore related to elder trees is extensive and can vary according to region. In some traditions, the elder tree is thought to ward off evil and give protection from witches, while other beliefs say that witches often congregate under the plant, especially when it is full of fruit. If an elder tree was cut down, a spirit known as the Elder Mother would be released and take her revenge. The tree could only safely be cut while chanting a rhyme to the Elder Mother. Romani people believe burning elder wood brings bad luck.

A wand made from the branch of an elder tree plays a pivotal role in the final book of the Harry Potter series, which was almost named Harry Potter and the Elder Wand.
