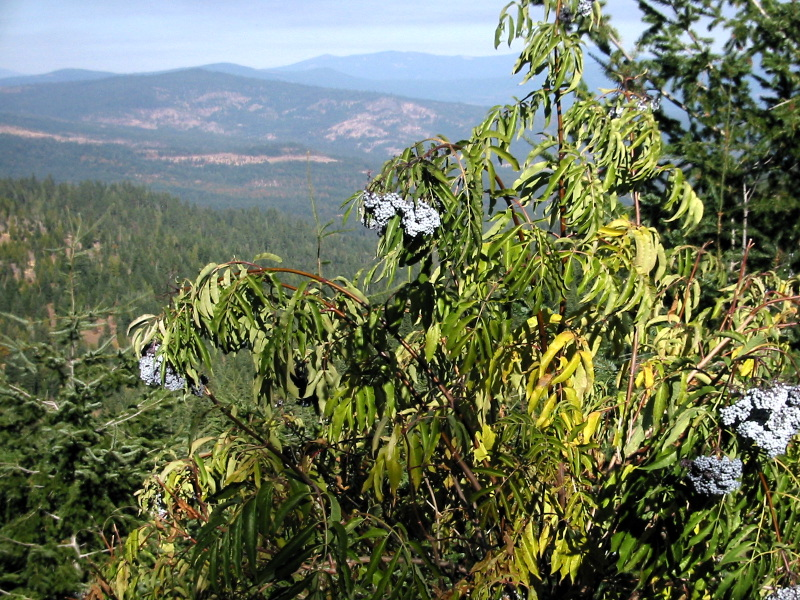
- Near Soda Mountain, southern Oregon

Scientific classification
- Kingdom: Plantae
- Clade: Embryophytes
- Clade: Tracheophytes
- Clade: Spermatophytes
- Clade: Angiosperms
- Clade: Eudicots
- Clade: Asterids
- Order: Dipsacales
- Family: Viburnaceae
- Genus: Sambucus
- Species: S. cerulea

Binomial name
- Sambucus cerulea Raf.
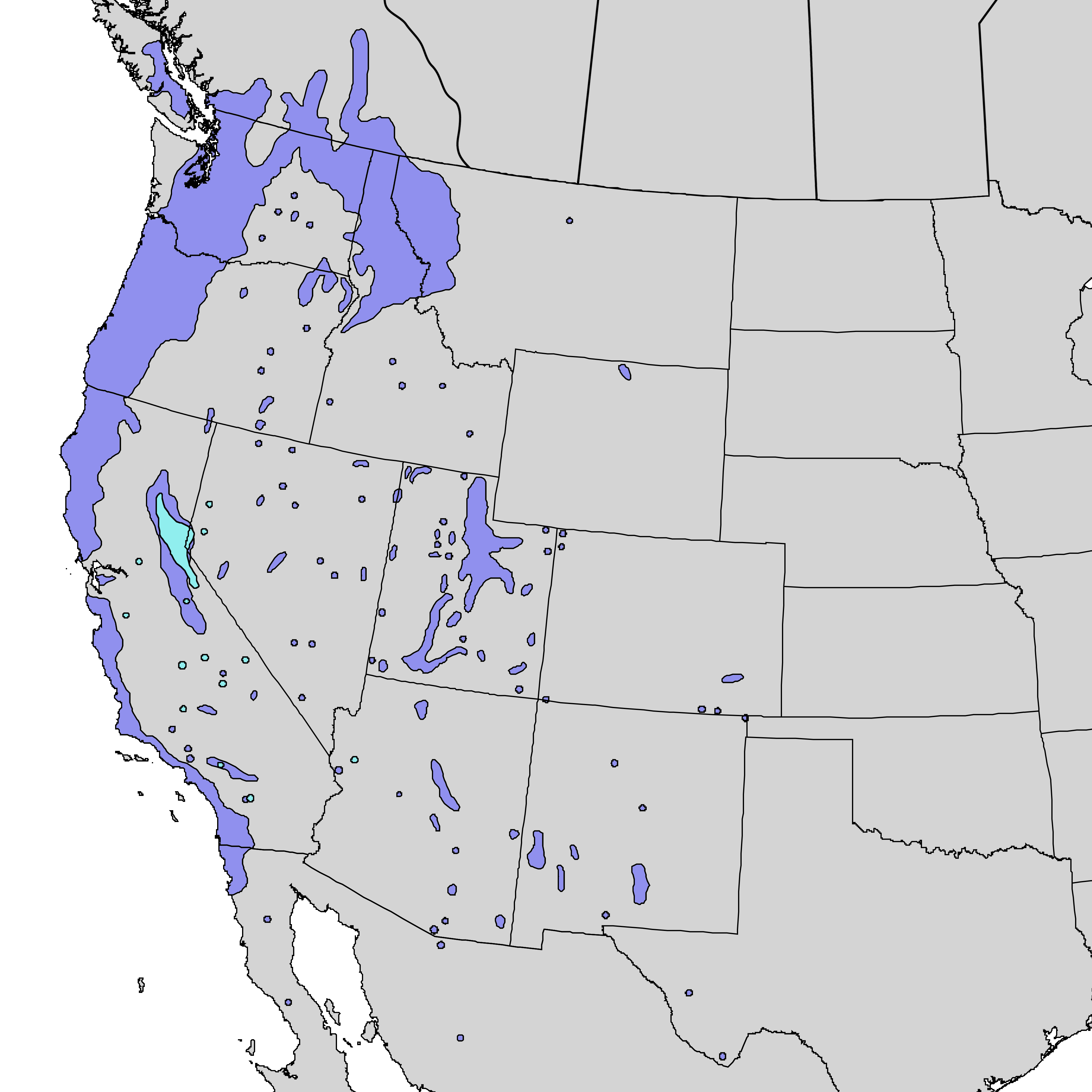
- Natural range of Sambucus cerulea (including S. velutina in lighter blue)

Synonyms
- Sambucus nigra subsp. cerulea Sambucus caerulea Sambucus glauca

= Sambucus cerulea =

Species of tree

Sambucus cerulea or Sambucus nigra subsp. cerulea, with the common names blue elderberry and blue elder, is a coarse textured shrub species of elder in the family Viburnaceae.

== Description ==
Sambucus cerulea is a large, deciduous shrub grow to 6 metres (20 ft) in height and width. It normally grows rather wildly from several stems, which can be heavily pruned (or even cut to the ground) during winter dormancy.

The leaves are pinnately divided into 5–9 leaflets. These are commonly 3–15 centimetres (1–6 inches) long and 2–6 cm (1–2 1/2 in) wide. They are elliptical to lanceolate, sharp-toothed and hairless. The blade extends unequally on the stalk at the base.

The white or creamy coloured flowers, occurring May to June, are numerous and form a flat-topped cluster usually about 5–20 cm (2–8 in) wide. They are umbel-shaped, normally with 4 to 5 rays extending from the base. The flowers have a strong, unpleasant odor. Individual flowers are 4–7 millimetres (1/8–1/4 in) wide.

The fruits given are berry-like drupes. They are juicy, round, and approximately 4–6 mm in diameter. They are bluish-black, with a glaucous powder coating lending them a light blue colour (and helping distinguish them from other elderberries). The fruit contains 3 to 5 small seed-like stones, each enclosing a single seed.

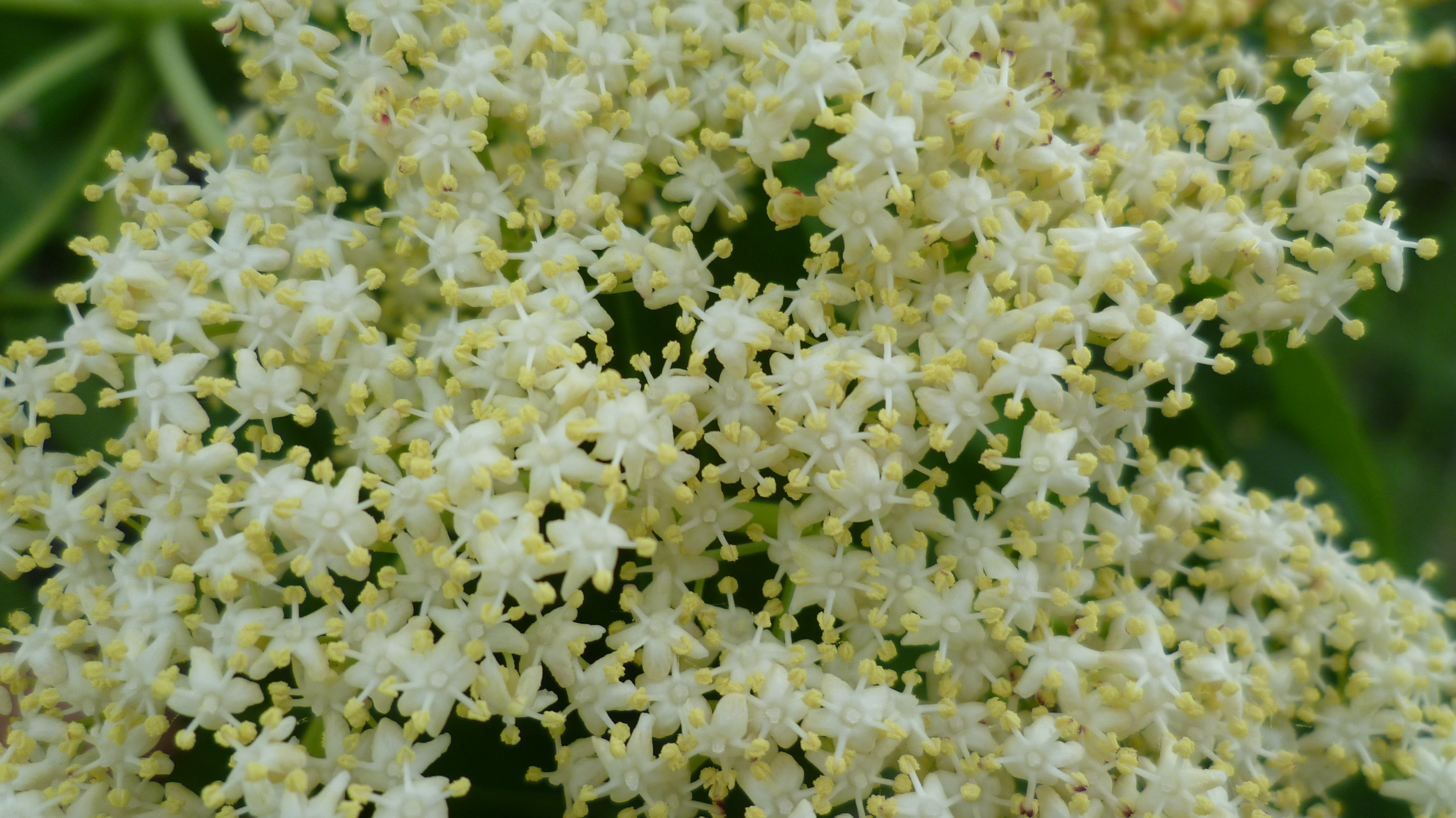
Flowers

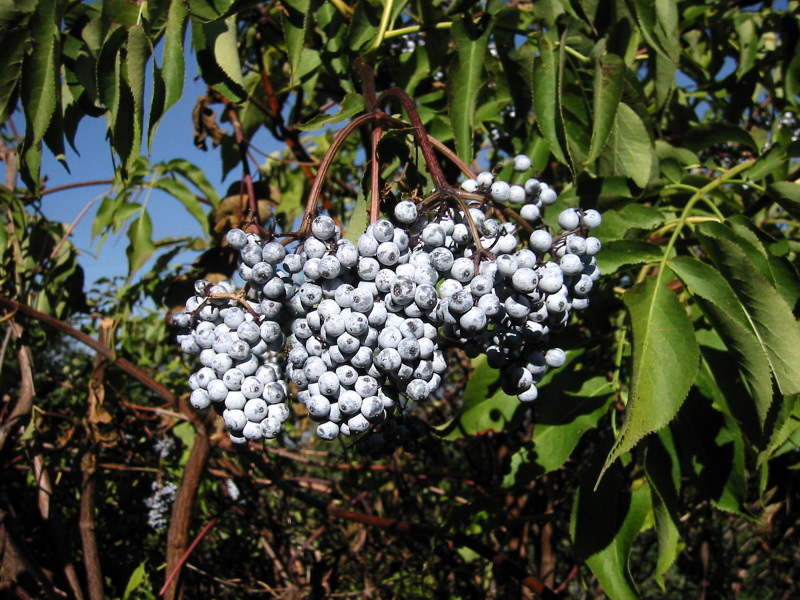
Berries

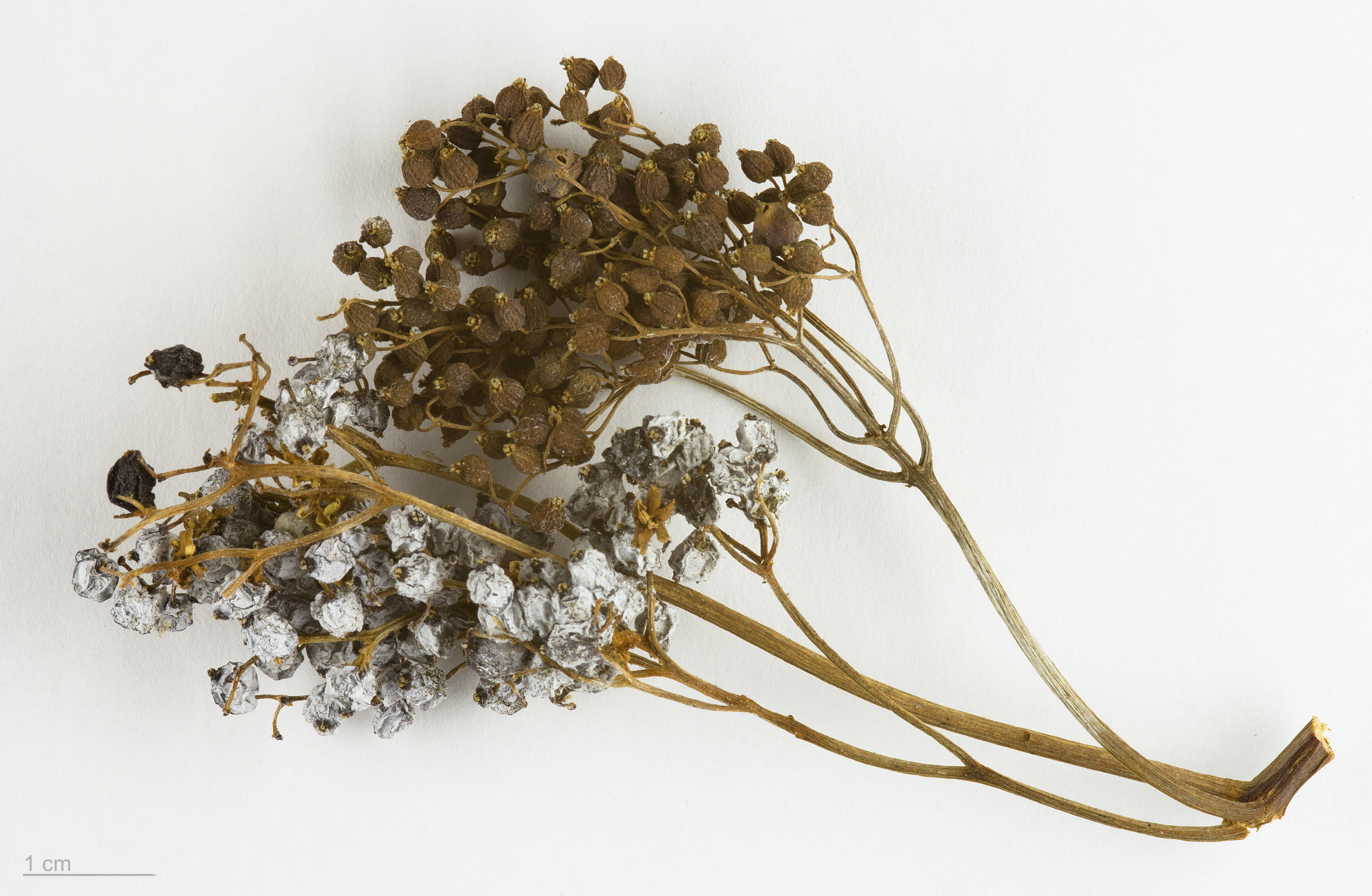
Dried branch, Muséum de Toulouse

== Taxonomy ==
The plant is classified by several different botanical names. Both the current United States Department of Agriculture database and The Jepson Manual of California flora (2013) classify it as S. nigra subsp. cerulea.

The Sunset Western Garden Book identifies the plant as Sambucus mexicana, and note use of S. caerulea also.

The botanist Victor King Chesnut (1867–1938) had classified it as S. glauca in 1902, when studying the plants used by the Indigenous peoples of California in Mendocino County.

== Distribution and habitat ==
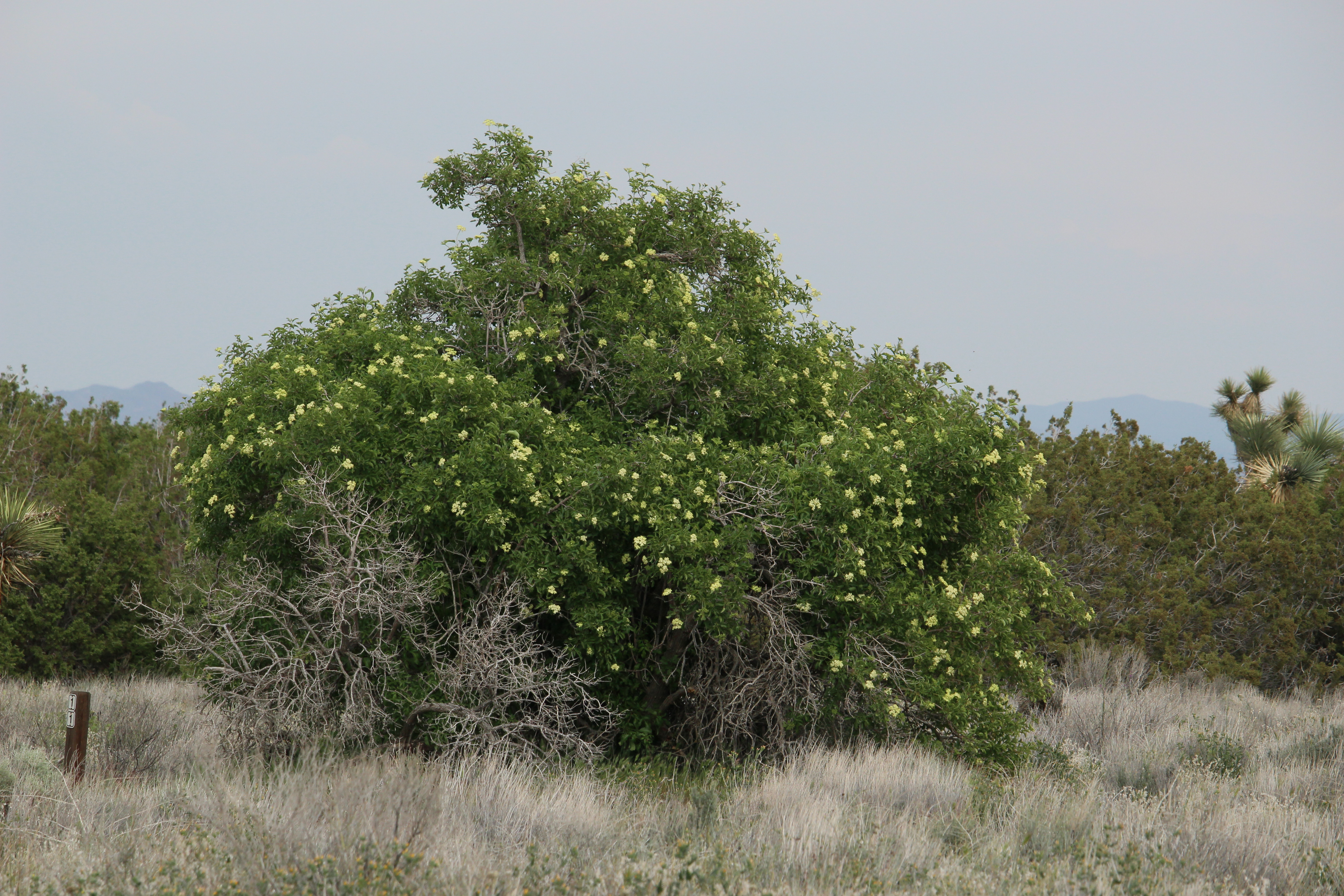
In southern California's Antelope Valley

S. cerulea is native to the Western United States, northwestern Mexico, and British Columbia. It is found from the Pacific coasts, through California and the Great Basin, to Montana, Wyoming, Texas and Oklahoma.

This species grows at elevations below 3,000 m (9,800 ft), in diverse habitats of mountains and hills, valleys, riparian zones, open places in woodlands and forests, and exposed slopes where moisture is reachable.

== Toxicity ==
The raw berries contain a toxin which, if eaten raw, may induce nausea in some people.

== Uses ==
The flower blossoms can be used to make tea. The fruits can be eaten raw (despite containing a toxin), dried, or as jelly.

=== Native American ===
The indigenous peoples of North America with the plant in their homelands use the leaves, blossoms, bark, roots, and wood for preparing traditional medicinal remedies, taken internally or applied externally. The fresh, dried, and cooked berries are used for food.

Some tribes used the wood to make musical instruments, such as flutes, clappers, and small whistles; (Note: The genus name comes from the Greek word sambuce, an ancient wind instrument, in reference to the removal of pith from the twigs to make whistles.) and smoking implements. Soft wood was used as a spindle "twirling stick" to make fire by friction. The bark was used to produce a remedy for fever. Stems and berries were used as a dye for basket weaving materials.

The Concow tribe of the Mendocino region calls the plant nō-kōm-hē-i′-nē in the Konkow language.

=== Cultivation ===
S. nigra subsp. cerulea is cultivated as an ornamental plant by plant nurseries, for planting in traditional, native plant, and habitat gardens. It is also used for natural landscaping and habitat restoration projects. It can become a multi-trunk tree when trained from youth with only several dominant trunks.

The plant is beneficial in wildlife gardens, its flowers attract pollinators, butterflies and hummingbirds, and its berries feed other bird species and chipmunks.
