= Clapstick =

Traditional Australian Aboriginal instrument

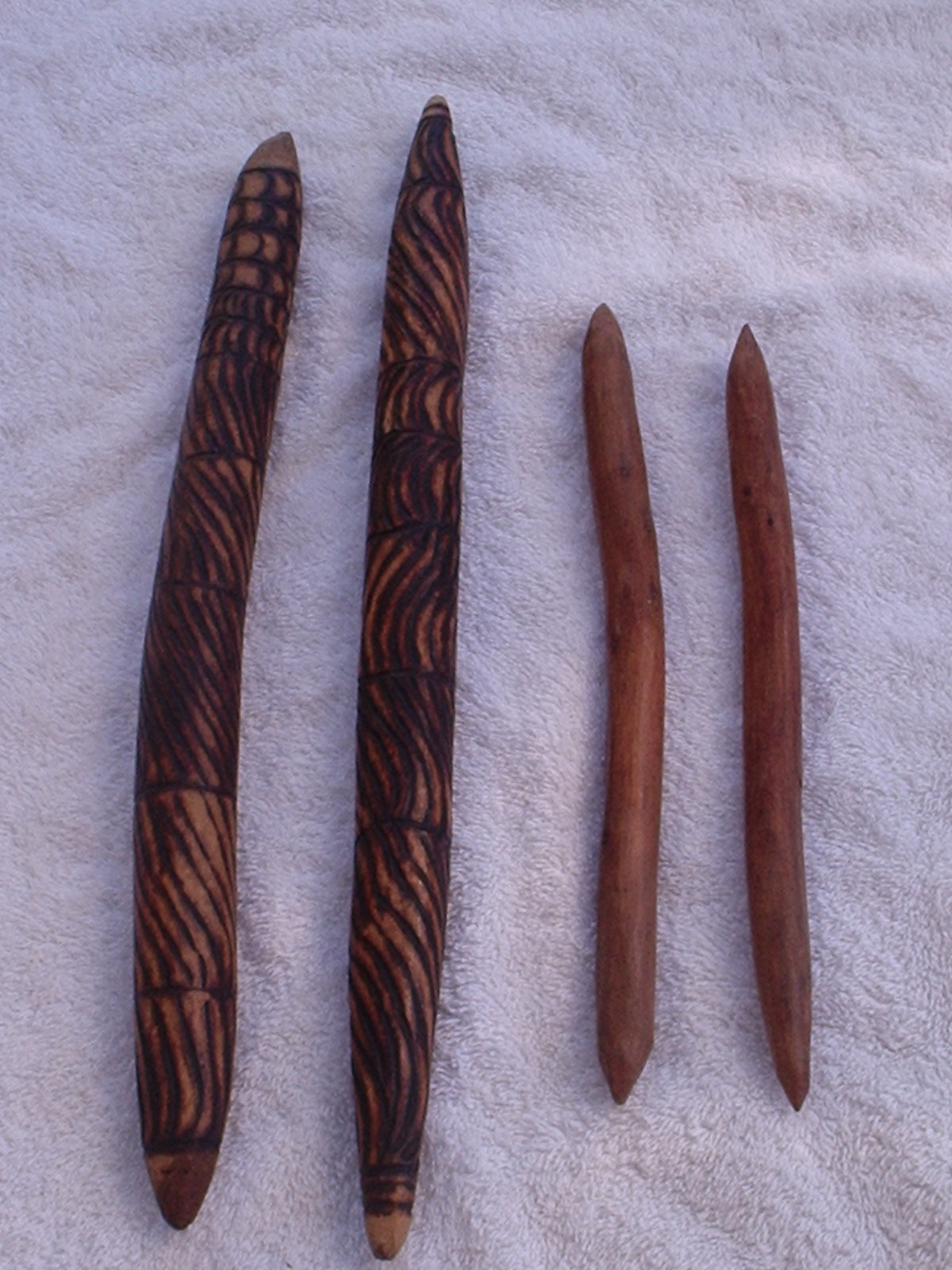
Two pairs of Australian Aboriginal clapsticks

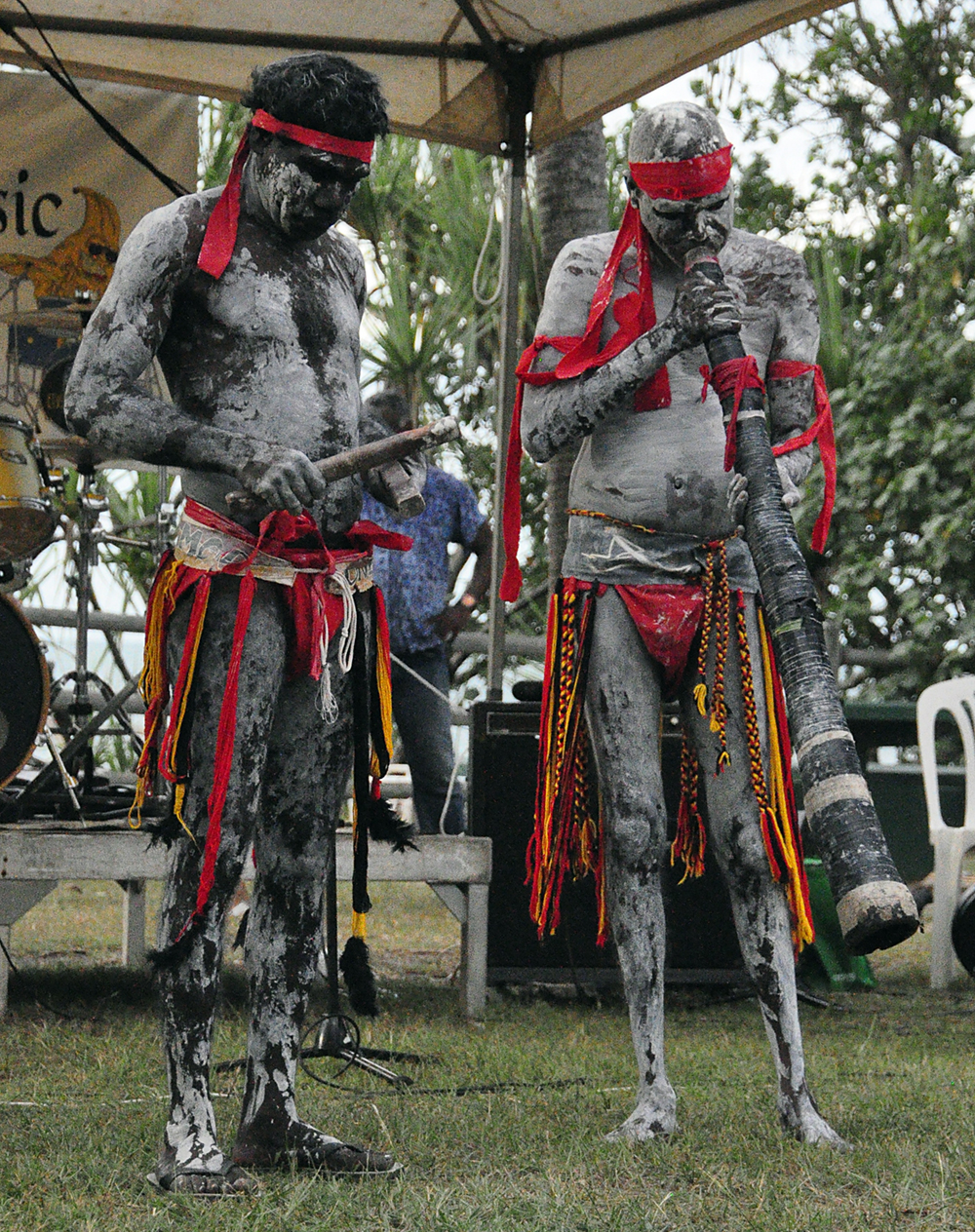
Didgeridoo and clapstick players performing at Nightcliff, Northern Territory

Clapsticks, also spelt clap sticks and also known as bilma, bimli, clappers, musicstick or just stick, are a traditional Australian Aboriginal instrument. They serve to maintain rhythm in voice chants, often as part of an Aboriginal ceremony.

They are a type of drumstick, percussion mallet or claves that belongs to the idiophone category. Unlike drumsticks, which are generally used to strike a drum, clapsticks are intended for striking one stick on another.

== Origin and nomenclature ==
In northern Australia, clapsticks would traditionally accompany the didgeridoo, and are called bimli or bilma by the Yolngu people of north-east Arnhem Land in the Northern Territory of Australia.

== Boomerang clapsticks ==
Boomerang clapsticks are similar to regular clapsticks but they can be shaken for a rattling sound or be clapped together.

== Technique ==
The usual technique employed when using clapsticks is to clap the sticks together to create a rhythm that goes along with the song.

== See also ==
- Clapper (musical instrument)
- Clapper stick
