= Clapper stick =

Traditional idiophone

Clapper stick(s)
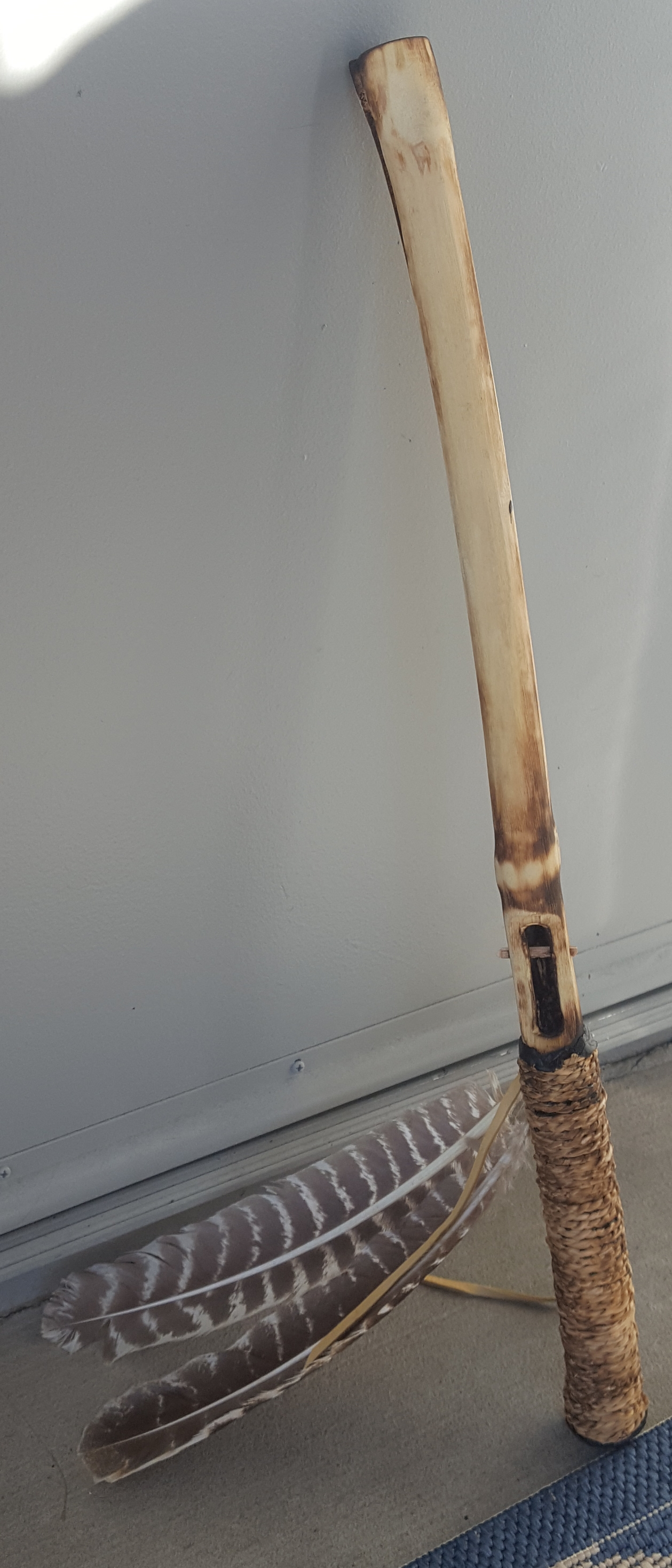
- Clapper stick

Percussion instrument
- Classification: hand percussion
- Hornbostel–Sachs classification: 111.11 (Directly struck stick concussive idiophone)

A clapper stick (also clap-stick or split stick rattle) is a traditional idiophone common among the indigenous peoples of California. It is traditionally constructed by cutting the branch of an elderberry tree, hollowing it out, and partially splitting the branch in two. It is used to keep time and accompany singers and dancers. Many are now made of bamboo, which do not require hollowing.

== Names in indigenous California languages ==
- Central Sierra Miwok: țakáț'a
- Chukchansi: tá-wit
- Chumash: wansak
- Hupa: kinah¬dun-ts’e:y’
- Maidu: pak'papa
- Mutsun: sallik
- Northern Paiute: hau tsavaiya
- Northern Pomo: hay bit’abit’aka
- Plains Miwok: taka'tta
- Serrano: pă-how-it
- Tongva: araawkewe
- Tubatulabal: ka*ba.ba.ynis't
- Western Mono: anawataki'inu
- Wintu: lasasus
- Yuki: al-lah-chi'-mah

== See also ==
- Clapper
- Clapstick
- Indigenous music of North America
