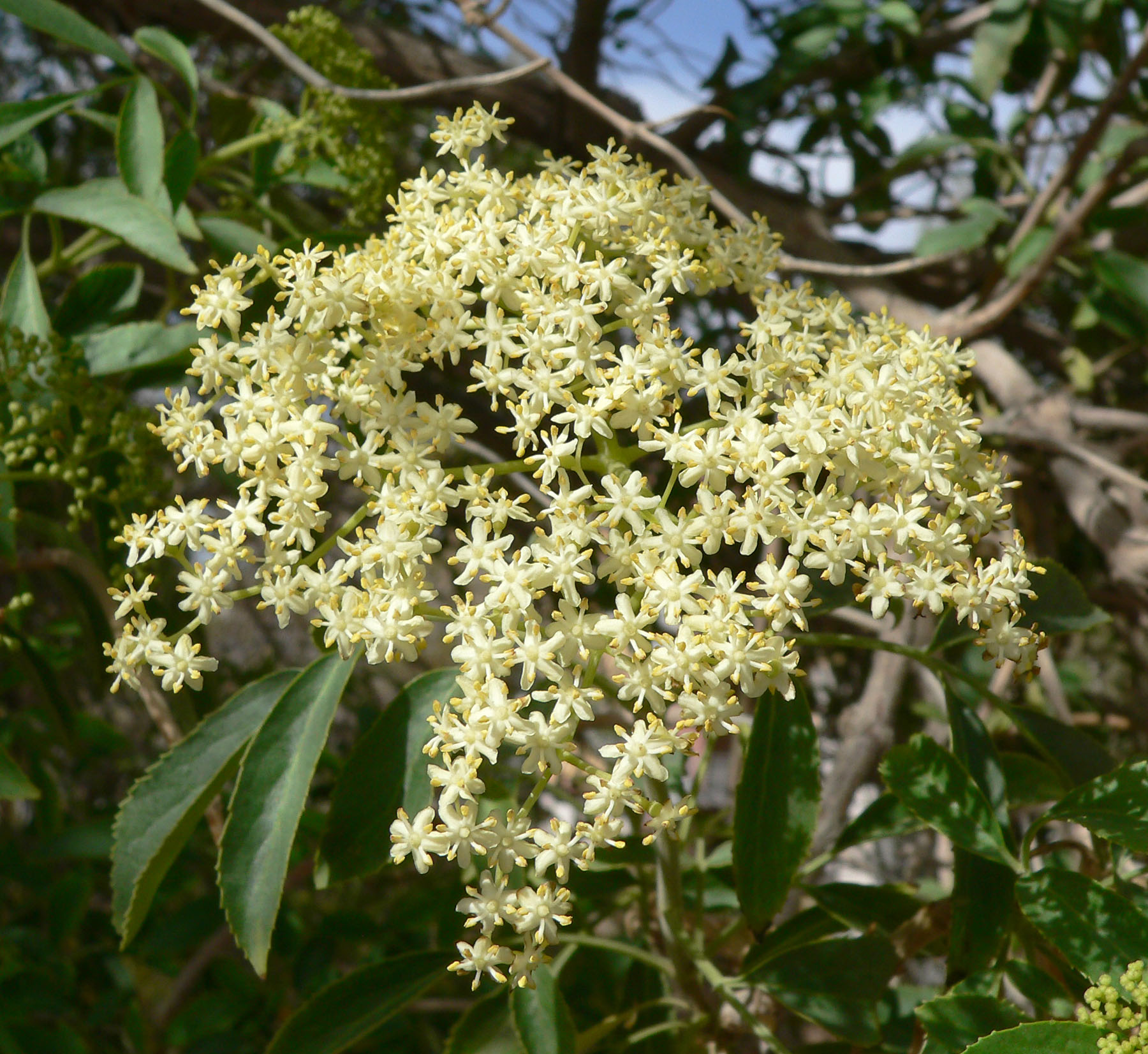
- Sambucus mexicana growing in the UNLV Arboretum, USA

Scientific classification
- Kingdom: Plantae
- Clade: Tracheophytes
- Clade: Angiosperms
- Clade: Eudicots
- Clade: Asterids
- Order: Dipsacales
- Family: Viburnaceae
- Genus: Sambucus
- Species: S. mexicana

Binomial name
- Sambucus mexicana C.Presl ex DC.
- It is native to northern Mexico and southwestern USA

Synonyms
- List: Sambucus canadensis var. mexicana (C.Presl ex DC.) Sarg.; Sambucus cerulea var. mexicana (C.Presl ex DC.) L.D.Benson; Sambucus mexicana var. typica Schwer.; Sambucus bipinnata Schltdl. & Cham.; Sambucus mexicana var. bipinnata Schwer.; Sambucus mexicana f. caudata Schwer.; Sambucus mexicana var. plantierensis Schwer.

= Sambucus mexicana =

Species of flowering plant

Sambucus mexicana is a species of deciduous shrub or tree in the family Viburnaceae native to northern Mexico and southwestern USA.

== Description ==
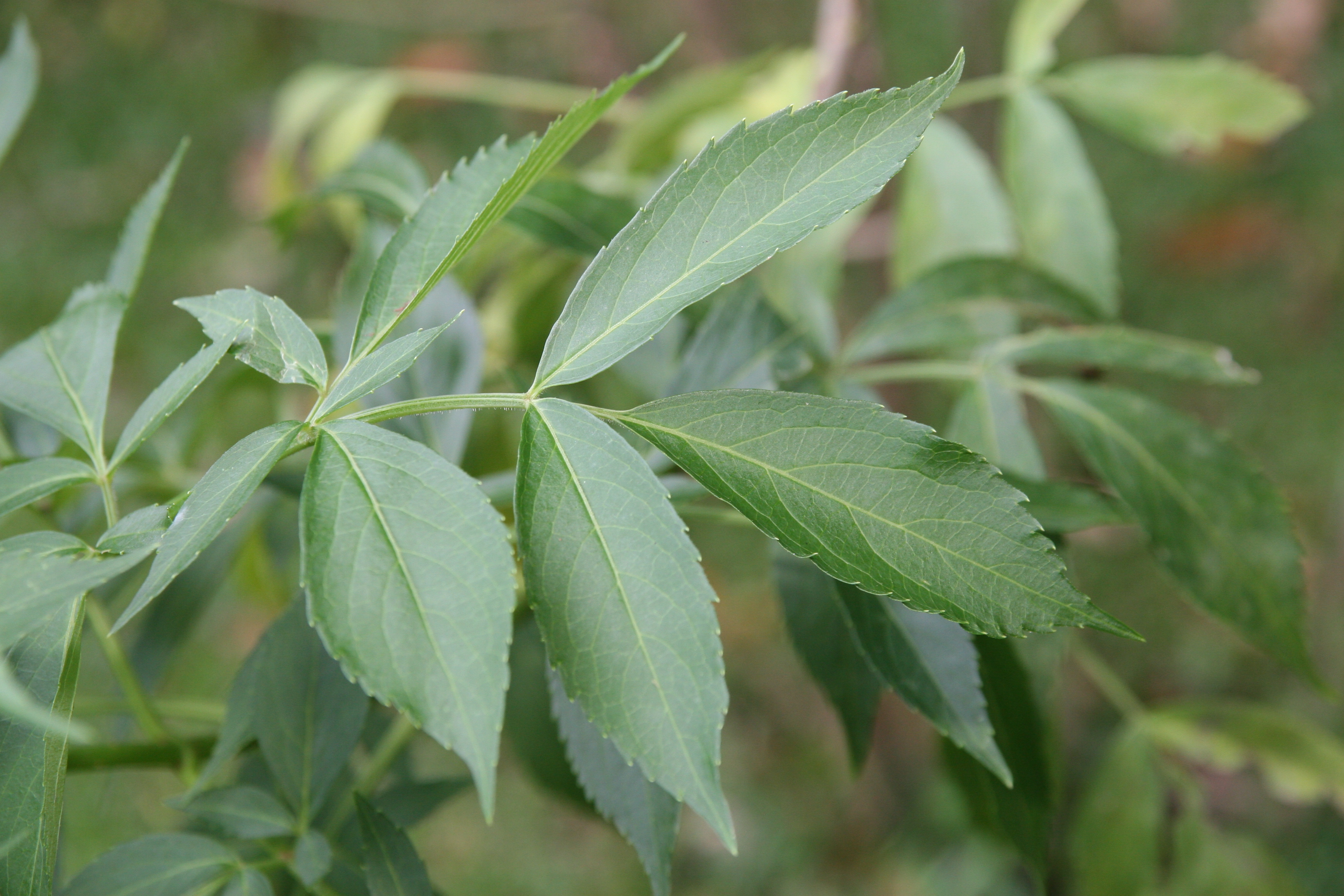
Compound leaf of Sambucus mexicana

=== Vegetative characteristics ===
Sambucus mexicana is a 2–8 m tall, rounded, multi-trunked, short lived, deciduous shrub or tree with green, pinnate leaves composed of 5–9 oppositely arranged, glabrous to pubescent, elliptic to ovate leaflets with a serrate margin. The gray to dark brown bark is ridged and irregularly furrowed. The soft wood is coarse-grained.

=== Generative characteristics ===
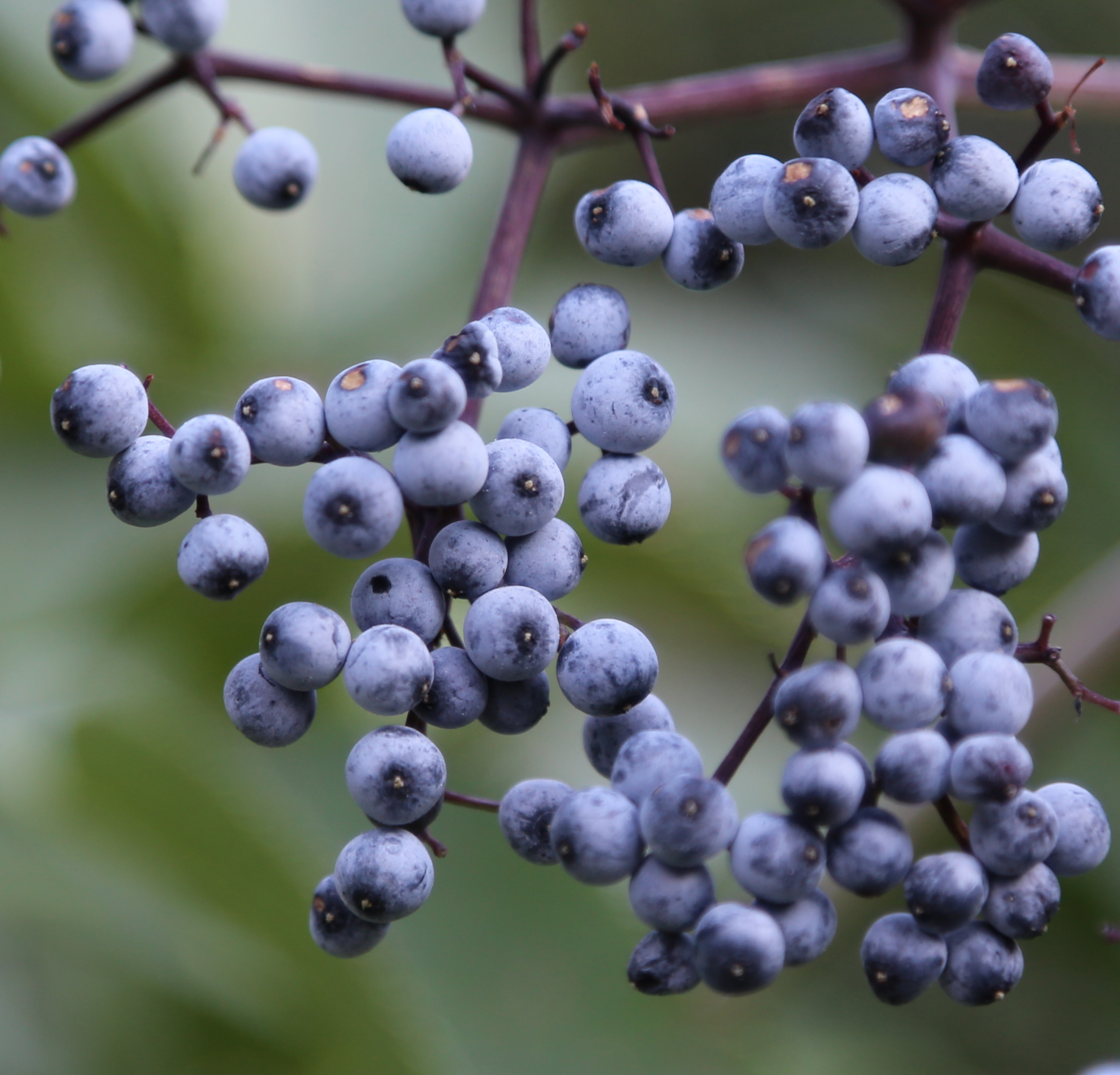
Sambucus mexicana berries

The flat, 4–33 cm wide inflorescence without a dominant central axis bears white to cream, entomophilous flowers. The glaucous berries are dark blue or black.

=== Cytology ===
The chromosome count is 2n = 36.

== Taxonomy ==
It was described in 1830 by Augustin Pyramus de Candolle based on previous work by Carl Borivoj Presl.

== Habitat and distribution ==
Sambucus mexicana is native to the United States (California, New Mexico, Texas, and Arizona) and Mexico (Sonora, Chihuahua). Often situated in wetlands adjacent to rivers, scrublands, and woodlands. Due to the adaptability of the plant, it is both dry and moist tolerant and often thrives with a consistent water source.

== Uses ==
Sambucus mexicana is used by several indigenous tribes in California, like Acjachemen Indians of San Juan Capistrano, California, and is an important plant for them. For the Acjachemen people, it is known as the “tree of music,” for the construction of wood to develop into clapper sticks, a percussive instrument.
